= Mutt and Jeff animated filmography =

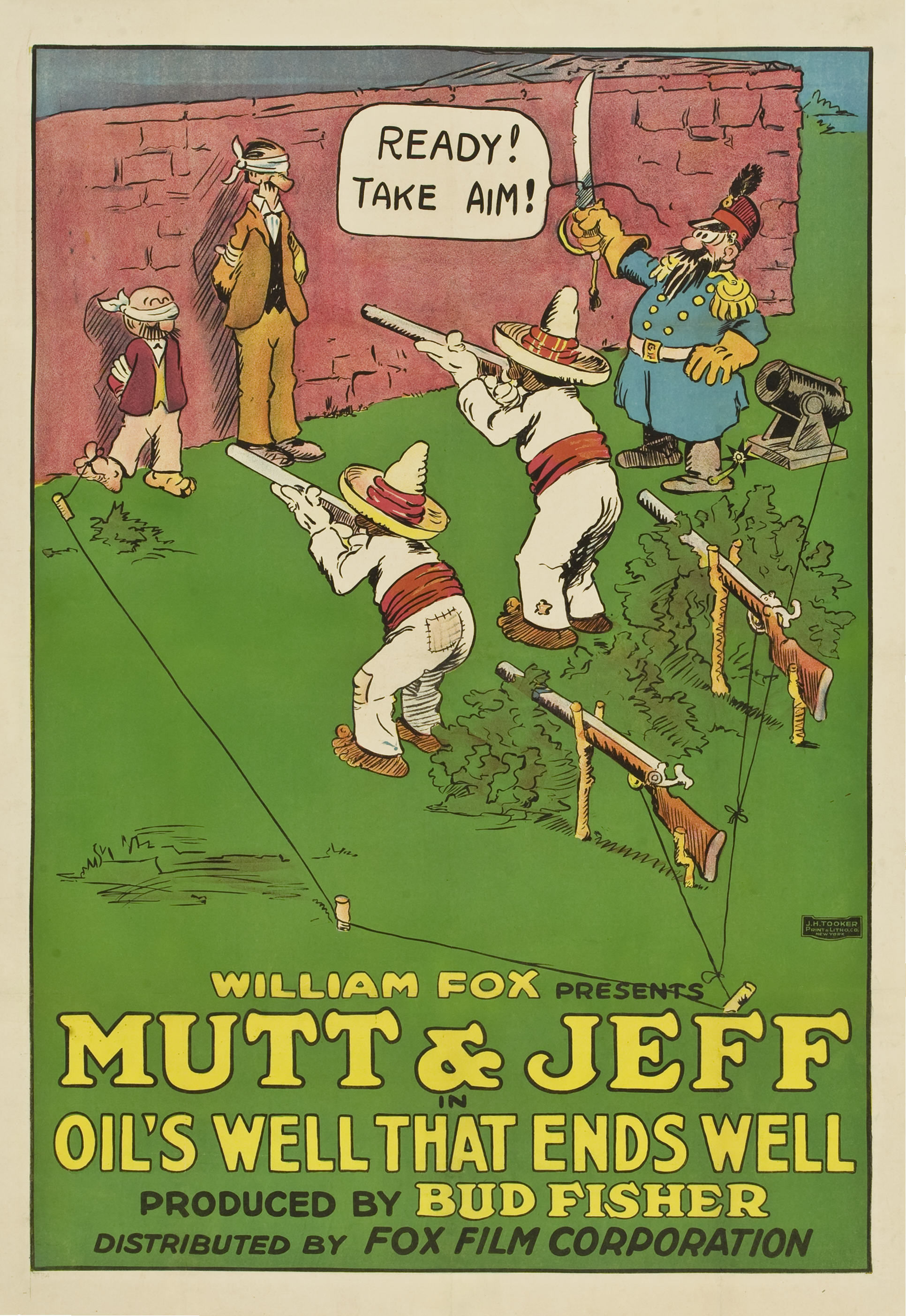
Poster for a 1919 short

In 1916, Bud Fisher licensed the production of Mutt and Jeff for animation with pioneers Charles Bowers and Raoul Barré of the Barré Studio. This resulted in 292 animated Mutt and Jeff shorts, making it the longest-running theatrical animated short series of the silent era, second to Krazy Kat in terms of years. The series ran from 1916 to 1923 and was distributed by the Fox Film company, the series was cancelled after the bankruptcy of the Barré Studio. It was briefly revived between 1925 to 1926, distributed by Short Films Syndicate. A few shorts of the second run were re-shot in the early-1930s by the Modern Film Sales Corporation with the Kromocolor process and reissued with sound effects and music tracks. Some of which were reissued in 1934 from the usage of the Brunswick Sound System. The following is a list of animated films in the series separated by years and distributor.

== Fox Film ==
1916
#	Title	Release Date	Director	Distributor	Film	Notes
3	Domestic Difficulties	March 6, 1916	Bud Fisher	Fox Films		
1	Jeff's Toothache	April 1, 1916	Bud Fisher	Fox Films		
2	Mutt and Jeff in the Submarine	April 8, 1916	Bud Fisher	Fox Films		
4	A Restless Night	1916	Bud Fisher	Fox Films		
5	The Indestructible Hats	August 12, 1916	Bud Fisher	Fox Films		
6	Cramps	1916	Bud Fisher	Fox Films		
7	The Dog Pound	1916	Bud Fisher	Fox Films		
8	The Hock Shop	1916	Bud Fisher	Fox Films		
9	The Promoters	1916	Bud Fisher	Fox Films		
10	Two for Hire	1916	Bud Fisher	Fox Films		Also titled “Two for Five”.
11	Wall Street	1916	Bud Fisher	Fox Films		

1917
#	Title	Release Date	Director	Distributor	Film	Notes
28	Laughing Gas	January 1, 1917	Bud Fisher	Fox Films		
12	Cows and Caws	July 9, 1917	Bud Fisher	Fox Films		
13	The Submarine Chasers	July 16, 1917	Bud Fisher	Fox Films		
14	The Cheese Tamers	July 23, 1917	Bud Fisher	Fox Films		
15	The Janitors	July 30, 1917	Bud Fisher	Fox Films		
16	A Chemical Calamity	August 6, 1917	Bud Fisher	Fox Films		Also known as “The Magician”.
17	The Prospectors	August 13, 1917	Bud Fisher, Raoul Barré, & Charles Bowers	Fox Films		
18	A Day in Camp	1917	Bud Fisher	Fox Films		
19	A Dog's Life	1917	Bud Fisher	Fox Films		
20	In the Theatrical Business	1917	Bud Fisher	Fox Films		
21	Preparedness	1917	Bud Fisher	Fox Films		
22	Revenge Is Sweet	1917	Bud Fisher	Fox Films		
23	The Bell Hops	1917	Bud Fisher	Fox Films		
24	The Circus	1917	Bud Fisher	Fox Films		
25	The Boarding House	1917	Bud Fisher	Fox Films		
26	The Chamber of Horrors	1917	Bud Fisher	Fox Films		
27	The Interpreters	1917	Bud Fisher	Fox Films		

1918
#	Title	Release Date	Director	Distributor	Film	Notes
29	The DeCoy	March 24, 1918	Bud Fisher	Fox Films		
30	Back to the Balkans	March 31, 1918	Bud Fisher	Fox Films		
31	The Leak	April 7, 1918	Bud Fisher	Fox Films		
32	Freight Investigation	April 14, 1918	Bud Fisher	Fox Films		
33	On Ice	April 21, 1918	Bud Fisher	Fox Films		
34	Helping McAdoo	April 28, 1918	Bud Fisher	Fox Films		
35	A Fisherless Cartoon	May 5, 1918	Bud Fisher	Fox Films		
36	Occultism	May 12, 1918	Bud Fisher	Fox Films		
37	Superintendents	May 19, 1918	Bud Fisher	Fox Films		
38	The Tonsorial Artists	May 26, 1918	Bud Fisher	Fox Films		
39	The Tale of a Pig	June 2, 1918	Bud Fisher	Fox Films		
40	Hospital Orderlies	June 9, 1918	Bud Fisher	Fox Films		
41	Life Savers	June 16, 1918	Bud Fisher	Fox Films		
42	Meeting Theda Bara	June 23, 1918	Bud Fisher	Fox Films		Features a appearance of Theda Bara.
43	The Seventy-Mile Gun	June 30, 1918	Bud Fisher	Fox Films		
44	The Burglar Alarm	July 7, 1918	Bud Fisher	Fox Films		
45	The Extra-Quick Lunch	July 14, 1918	Charles Bowers & Bud Fisher	Fox Films		
46	Hunting the U-Boats	July 21, 1918	Bud Fisher	Fox Films		
47	Hotel De Mutt	July 28, 1918	Bud Fisher	Fox Films		
48	Joining the Tanks	August 4, 1918	Bud Fisher	Fox Films		
49	An Ace and a Joker	August 11, 1918	Bud Fisher	Fox Films		
50	Landing a Spy	August 18, 1918	Bud Fisher	Fox Films		
51	Efficiency	August 25, 1918	Bud Fisher	Fox Films		
52	The Accident Attorney	September 1, 1918	Bud Fisher	Fox Films		
53	At the Front	September 8, 1918	Bud Fisher	Fox Films		
54	To the Rescue	September 15, 1918	Bud Fisher	Fox Films		
55	The Kaiser's New Dentist	September 22, 1918	Bud Fisher	Fox Films		
56	Bulling the Bolshevik	September 29, 1918	Bud Fisher	Fox Films		Also known as “Bulling the Bolsheviki” & “Saving Russia”.
57	Our Four Days in Germany	October 6, 1918	Bud Fisher	Fox Films		
58	The Side Show	October 13, 1918	Bud Fisher	Fox Films		
59	A Lot of Bull	November 10, 1918	Bud Fisher	Fox Films		
60	The Doughboy	November 17, 1918	Bud Fisher	Fox Films		
61	Around the World in Nine Minutes	November 24, 1918	Bud Fisher	Fox Films		
62	Pot Luck in the Army	December 1, 1918	Bud Fisher	Fox Films		
63	The New Champion	December 1, 1918	Bud Fisher	Fox Films		
64	Hitting the High Spots	December 15, 1918	Bud Fisher	Fox Films		Not to be confused with the other 1918 film of the same name. Sometimes mistitled “Hitting the High Sports”.
65	The Draft Board	December 22, 1918	Bud Fisher	Fox Films		
66	Throwing the Bull	December 29, 1918	Bud Fisher	Fox Films		Not to be confused with the 1918 Happy Hooligan cartoon of the same name.

1919
#	Title	Release Date	Director	Distributor	Film	Notes
	The Lion Tamers	January 5, 1919	Bud Fisher	Fox Films		
	Here And There	January 19, 1919	Bud Fisher	Fox Films		
	The Hula Hula Cabaret	January 19, 1919	Bud Fisher	Fox Films		
	Dog-Gone Tough Luck	January 26, 1919	Bud Fisher	Fox Films		
	Landing An Heiress	February 2, 1919	Bud Fisher	Fox Films		
	The Bearded Lady	February 9, 1919	Bud Fisher	Fox Films		
	500 Miles On A Gallon Of Gas	February 16, 1919	Bud Fisher	Fox Films		
	The Pousse Cafe	February 25, 1919	Bud Fisher	Fox Films		
	Fireman Save My Child	March 2, 1919	Bud Fisher	Fox Films		
	Wild Waves And Angry Woman	March 9, 1919	Bud Fisher	Fox Films		
	William Hohenzollern Sausage Maker	March 16, 1919	Bud Fisher	Fox Films		
	Out an' In Again	March 23, 1919	Bud Fisher	Fox Films		
	The Cow's Husband	March 30, 1919	Bud Fisher	Fox Films		
	Mutt The Mutt Trainer	April 6, 1919	Bud Fisher	Fox Films		
	Subbing For Tom Mix	April 13, 1919	Bud Fisher	Fox Films		
	Pigtails And Peaches	April 20, 1919	Bud Fisher	Fox Films		
	Seeing Things	April 27, 1919	Bud Fisher	Fox Films		
	The Cave Man's Bride	May 4, 1919	Bud Fisher	Fox Films		
	Sir Sidney	May 11, 1919	Bud Fisher	Fox Films		
	Left at The Post	May 18, 1919	Bud Fisher	Fox Films		
	The Shell Game	May 25, 1919	Bud Fisher	Fox Films		
	Oh Teacher	June 1, 1919	Bud Fisher	Fox Films		Not to be confused with the 1927 oswald short of the same name.
	Hands Up	June 8, 1919	Bud Fisher	Fox Films		
	Sweet Papa	June 15, 1919	Bud Fisher	Fox Films		
	Pets And Pests	June 22, 1919	Bud Fisher	Fox Films		
	A Prize Fight	June 29, 1919	Bud Fisher	Fox Films		
	Look Pleasant Please	July 6, 1919	Bud Fisher	Fox Films		
	Mutt And Jeff In London	July 7, 1919	Bud Fisher	Fox Films		
	Downstairs And Up	July 13, 1919	Bud Fisher	Fox Films		
	A Tropical Eggs-pedi-tion	July 20, 1919	Bud Fisher	Fox Films		
	West Is East	July 27, 1919	Bud Fisher	Fox Films		
	The Jazz Instructors	August 3, 1919	Bud Fisher	Fox Films		
	Oil's Well That Ends Well	August 10, 1919	Bud Fisher	Fox Films		
	The Frozen North	August 17, 1919	Bud Fisher	Fox Films		
	Sound Your 'A'	August 24, 1919	Bud Fisher	Fox Films		
	Hard Lions	August 31, 1919	Bud Fisher	Fox Films		
	Mutt And Jeff In Paris	September 7, 1919	Bud Fisher	Fox Films		
	Mutt And Jeff In Switzerland	September 7, 1919	Bud Fisher	Fox Films		
	All That Glitters Is Not Goldfish	September 14, 1919	Bud Fisher	Fox Films		
	Everybody's Doing It	September 21, 1919	Bud Fisher	Fox Films		
	Mutt And Jeff In Spain	September 28, 1919	Bud Fisher	Fox Films		
	The Honest Book Agent	October 5, 1919	Bud Fisher	Fox Films		
	New York Night Life	October 12, 1919	Bud Fisher	Fox Films		
	Bound In Spaghetti	October 19, 1919	Bud Fisher	Fox Films		
	In The Money	October 26, 1919	Bud Fisher	Fox Films		
	The Window Cleaners	November 2, 1919	Bud Fisher	Fox Films		
	Confessions Of A Telephone Girl	November 9, 1919	Bud Fisher	Fox Films		
	The Plumbers	November 16, 1919	Bud Fisher	Fox Films		
	The Chambermaid's Revenge	November 23, 1919	Bud Fisher	Fox Films		
	Why Mutt Left The Village	November 30, 1919	Bud Fisher	Fox Films		
	Cutting Out His Nonsense	December 7, 1919	Bud Fisher	Fox Films		
	For Bitter Or For Verse	December 14, 1919	Bud Fisher	Fox Films		
	He Ain't Done Right by Our Nell	December 21, 1919	Bud Fisher	Fox Films		
	Another Man's Wife	December 28, 1919	Bud Fisher	Fox Films		

1920
#	Title	Release Date	Director	Distributor	Film	Notes
	A Glutton For Punishment	January, 1920	Bud Fisher	Fox Films		
	A Rose by Any Other Name	January, 1920	Bud Fisher	Fox Films		
	Shaking The Shimmy	January, 1920	Bud Fisher	Fox Films		
	Fisherman's Luck	January, 1920	Bud Fisher	Fox Films		
	His Musical Soup	January, 1920	Bud Fisher	Fox Films		
	Mutt And Jeff In Iceland	January, 1920	Bud Fisher	Fox Films		
	Mutt And Jeff's Nooze Weekly	January, 1920	Bud Fisher	Fox Films		
	On Strike	January, 1920	Bud Fisher	Fox Films		
	Pretzel Farming	January, 1920	Bud Fisher	Fox Films		
	The Berth of a Nation	January, 1920	Bud Fisher	Fox Films		Also titled “Berth of a Nation”.
	The Latest In Underwear	January, 1920	Bud Fisher	Fox Films		
	The Rum Runners	January, 1920	Bud Fisher	Fox Films		
	Dead Eye Jeff	February, 1920	Bud Fisher	Fox Films		
	Fishing	February, 1920	Bud Fisher	Fox Films		
	I'm Ringing Your Party	February, 1920	Bud Fisher	Fox Films		
	Putting On The Dog	February, 1920	Bud Fisher	Fox Films		
	The Chemists	February, 1920	Bud Fisher	Fox Films		
	The Mint Spy	February, 1920	Bud Fisher	Fox Films		
	The Pawnbrokers	February, 1920	Bud Fisher	Fox Films		
	The Plumbers	February, 1920	Bud Fisher	Fox Films		
	The Sour Violin	February, 1920	Bud Fisher	Fox Films		Also titled “The Soul Violin”.
	Hula Hula Town	March, 1920	Bud Fisher	Fox Films		
	The Beautiful Model	March, 1920	Bud Fisher	Fox Films		
	The Chewing Gum Industry	March, 1920	Bud Fisher	Fox Films		Not to be confused with the 1922 cartoon with the same name.
	The Great Pickle Robbery	March, 1920	Bud Fisher	Fox Films		
	The Honest Jockey	March, 1920	Bud Fisher	Fox Films		
	The Price Of A Good Sneeze	March, 1920	Bud Fisher	Fox Films		
	Nothing But Girls	April, 1920	Bud Fisher	Fox Films		
	The Bicycle Race	April, 1920	Bud Fisher	Fox Films		
	The Bowling Alley	April, 1920	Bud Fisher	Fox Films		
	The Paper Hangers	April, 1920	Bud Fisher	Fox Films		
	The Private Detectives	April, 1920	Bud Fisher	Fox Films		
	The Wrestlers	April, 1920	Bud Fisher	Fox Films		
	A Trip To Mars	May, 1920	Bud Fisher	Fox Films		
	One Round Jeff	May, 1920	Bud Fisher	Fox Films		
	The Tango Dancers	May, 1920	Bud Fisher	Fox Films		
	The Toy Makers	May, 1920	Bud Fisher	Fox Films		
	Departed Spirits	June, 1920	Bud Fisher	Fox Films		
	The Breakfast Food Industry	June, 1920	Bud Fisher	Fox Films		
	The Mystery of the Galvanized Iron Ash Can	June, 1920	Bud Fisher	Fox Films		
	Three Raisins And A Cake Of Yeast	June, 1920	Bud Fisher	Fox Films		
	The Bare Idea	July, 1920	Bud Fisher	Fox Films		
	In Wrong	August, 1920	Bud Fisher	Fox Films		
	The Yacht Race	August, 1920	Bud Fisher	Fox Films		
	Hot Dogs	September, 1920	Bud Fisher	Fox Films		
	The Merry Cafe	September, 1920	Bud Fisher	Fox Films		
	Home Sweet Home	September, 1920	Bud Fisher	Fox Films		
	Napoleon	September, 1920	Bud Fisher	Fox Films		
	The Cowpunchers	September, 1920	Bud Fisher	Fox Films		
	The Song Birds	September, 1920	Bud Fisher	Fox Films		
	The Tailor Shop	September, 1920	Bud Fisher	Fox Films		
	The Politicians	October, 1920	Bud Fisher	Fox Films		
	Flapjacks	October, 1920	Bud Fisher	Fox Films		
	The Brave Toreador	October, 1920	Bud Fisher	Fox Films		Also titled “Brave Toreador”.
	The High Cost Of Living	October, 1920	Bud Fisher	Fox Films		
	The League of Nations	October, 1920	Bud Fisher	Fox Films		Also titled “League of Nations”.
	A Tightrope Romance	November, 1920	Bud Fisher	Fox Films		
	Farm Efficiency	November, 1920	Bud Fisher	Fox Films		
	The Medicine Man	November, 1920	Bud Fisher	Fox Films		
	Cleopatra	November, 1920	Bud Fisher	Fox Films		
	A Hard Luck Santa Claus	December, 1920	Bud Fisher	Fox Films		
	All Stuck Up	December, 1920	Bud Fisher	Fox Films		
	Home Brew	December, 1920	Bud Fisher	Fox Films		
	On The Hop	1920	Bud Fisher	Fox Films		
	The Parlor Bolshevist	December, 1920	Bud Fisher	Fox Films		

1921
#	Title	Release Date	Director	Distributor	Film	Notes
	Sherlock Hawkshaw And Company	January, 1921	Bud Fisher	Fox Films		
	The Hypnotist	January, 1921	Bud Fisher	Fox Films		
	The North Woods	January, 1921	Bud Fisher	Fox Films		
	The Papoose	January, 1921	Bud Fisher	Fox Films		
	Gum Shoe Work	February, 1921	Bud Fisher	Fox Films		
	The Glue Factory	February, 1921	Bud Fisher	Fox Films		
	The Lion Hunters	February 26, 1921	Bud Fisher	Fox Films		
	The Ventriloquist	February 27, 1921	Bud Fisher	Fox Films		
	Dr. Killjoy	March 18, 1921	Bud Fisher	Fox Films		
	Factory To Consumer	March 20, 1921	Bud Fisher	Fox Films		
	A Crazy Idea	March, 1921	Bud Fisher	Fox Films		
	The Naturalists	April 17, 1921	Bud Fisher	Fox Films		Also titled “The Naturalist”.
	A Rare Bird	April, 1921	Bud Fisher	Fox Films		
	Flivvering	April, 1921	Bud Fisher	Fox Films		
	Gathering Coconuts	May 7, 1921	Bud Fisher	Fox Films		
	It's A Bear	May 7, 1921	Bud Fisher	Fox Films		
	Mademoiselle Fifi	May 7, 1921	Bud Fisher	Fox Films		
	The Vacuum Cleaner	May 7, 1921	Bud Fisher	Fox Films		
	The Far North	May 7, 1921	Bud Fisher	Fox Films		
	A Hard Shell Game	May 14, 1921	Bud Fisher	Fox Films		
	Cold Tea	June 11, 1921	Bud Fisher	Fox Films		
	The Gusher	June 12, 1921	Bud Fisher	Fox Films		
	A Shocking Idea	June, 1921	Bud Fisher	Fox Films		
	Training Woodpeckers	June, 1921	Bud Fisher	Fox Films		
	Watering The Elephants	June 26, 1921	Bud Fisher	Fox Films		
	The Far East	July, 1921	Bud Fisher	Fox Films		Also titled “Far East”.
	Touring	July, 1921	Bud Fisher	Fox Films		
	Crows And Scarecrows	July, 1921	Bud Fisher	Fox Films		
	Darkest Africa	July, 1921	Bud Fisher	Fox Films		
	Not Wedded, But a Wife	July, 1921	Bud Fisher	Fox Films		
	The Painter's Frolic	July, 1921	Bud Fisher	Fox Films		
	The Stampede	September 17, 1921	Bud Fisher	Fox Films		
	The Tong Sandwich	September 17, 1921	Bud Fisher	Fox Films		
	The Big Mystery	October, 1921	Bud Fisher	Fox Films		
	Shadowed	October 18, 1921	Bud Fisher	Fox Films		
	The Turkish Bath	October 18, 1921	Bud Fisher	Fox Films		
	White Meat	November, 1921	Bud Fisher	Fox Films		
	A Messy Christmas	November 26, 1921	Bud Fisher	Fox Films		
	Fast Freight	November 26, 1921	Bud Fisher	Fox Films		
	The Village Cutups	November 26, 1921	Bud Fisher	Fox Films		Also titled “Village Cutups”.
	The Stolen Snooze	December 11, 1921	Bud Fisher	Fox Films		
	Getting A-Head	December 18, 1921	Bud Fisher	Fox Films		Also titled “Getting Ahead”.
	Bony Parts	December 25, 1921	Bud Fisher	Fox Films		

1922
#	Title	Release Date	Director	Distributor	Film	Notes
	Beside The Cider	January, 1922	Bud Fisher	Fox Films		Also titled “Beside Her Cider”.
	The Hole Cheese	January, 1922	Bud Fisher	Fox Films		
	A Ghostly Wallop	January, 1922	Bud Fisher	Fox Films		
	Long Live The King	January, 1922	Bud Fisher	Fox Films		
	The Last Laugh	January, 1922	Bud Fisher	Fox Films		
	The Bull Fight	January 22, 1922	Bud Fisher	Fox Films		
	Stuck In The Mud	February, 1922	Bud Fisher	Fox Films		
	The Crystal Gazer	February, 1922	Bud Fisher	Fox Films		
	The Phoney Focus	February, 1922	Bud Fisher	Fox Films		
	The Last Shot	March 5, 1922	Bud Fisher	Fox Films		
	The Cashier	March 12, 1922	Bud Fisher	Fox Films		
	Too Much Sap	March 12, 1922	Bud Fisher	Fox Films		Also titled “Too Much Soap”.
	Any Ice Today?	March 26, 1922	Bud Fisher	Fox Films		
	Hoot Mon	April 2, 1922	Bud Fisher	Fox Films		
	Golfing	April 9, 1922	Bud Fisher	Fox Films		
	Tin Foiled	April 16, 1922	Bud Fisher	Fox Films		
	Amid The Pyramids	April 23, 1922	Bud Fisher	Fox Films		Also titled “Around the Pyramids”.
	Getting Even	April 30, 1922	Bud Fisher	Fox Films		
	Hop, Skip And Jump	May 7, 1922	Bud Fisher	Fox Films		
	Modern Fishing	May 14, 1922	Bud Fisher	Fox Films		
	Hither And Thither	May 21, 1922	Bud Fisher	Fox Films		
	Falls Ahead	August 20, 1922	Bud Fisher	Fox Films		
	Court Plastered	September 3, 1922	Bud Fisher	Fox Films		
	Riding The Goat	September 17, 1922	Bud Fisher	Fox Films		
	Red Hot	October 1, 1922	Bud Fisher	Fox Films		
	The Fallen Archers	October 15, 1922	Bud Fisher	Fox Films		
	Cold Turkey	October 29, 1922	Bud Fisher	Fox Films		
	The Wishing Duck	November 12, 1922	Bud Fisher	Fox Films		
	Bumps & Thumps	November 26, 1922	Bud Fisher	Fox Films		Also titled “Bumps and Things”.
	The Chewing Gum Industry	December 10, 1922	Bud Fisher	Fox Films		Not to be confused with the 1920 cartoon with the same name.
	Gym Jams	December 24, 1922	Bud Fisher	Fox Films		

1923
#	Title	Release Date	Director	Distributor	Film	Notes
	Down In Dixie	January 21, 1923	Bud Fisher	Fox Films		
	Nearing The End	February 4, 1923	Bud Fisher	Fox Films		The final Mutt and Jeff cartoon in the original series.

== Short Films Syndicate ==
1925
#	Title	Release Date	Director	Distributor	Film	Notes
	Accidents Won't Happen	September, 1925	Bud Fisher & Charles Bowers	Short Films Syndicate		Redrawn colorized in the 1970s.
	Soda Jerks	September, 1925	Bud Fisher & Charles Bowers	Short Films Syndicate		Redrawn colorized in the 1970s.
	The Invisible Revenge	October, 1925	Bud Fisher & Charles Bowers	Short Films Syndicate		Also known as “Invisible Revenge”. Redrawn colorized in the 1970s.
	Where Am I?	October, 1925	Bud Fisher & Charles Bowers	Short Films Syndicate		Re-released in color & sound in the 1930s, and again in the 1970s.
	The Bear Facts	November, 1925	Bud Fisher & Charles Bowers	Short Films Syndicate		
	Mixing in Mexico	November 17, 1925	Bud Fisher & Charles Bowers	Short Films Syndicate		Re-released in color & sound in the 1930s, and again in the 1970s.
	Oceans Of Trouble	November, 1925	Bud Fisher & Charles Bowers	Short Films Syndicate		Redrawn colorized in the 1970s.
	Thou Shalt Not Pass	December 5, 1925	Bud Fisher & Charles Bowers	Short Films Syndicate		Redrawn colorized in the 1970s.
	A Link Missing	December 12, 1925	Bud Fisher & Charles Bowers	Short Films Syndicate		

1926
#	Title	Release Date	Director	Distributor	Film	Notes
	Bombs and Bums	January, 1926	Bud Fisher & Charles Bowers	Short Films Syndicate		Also known as “Bombs and Boobs”.
	Set 'em Up Again	January, 1926	Bud Fisher & Charles Bowers	Short Films Syndicate		Also titled “Set Em Up Again”.
	A Stretch in Time	February, 1926	Bud Fisher & Charles Bowers	Short Films Syndicate		
	On Thin Ice	February 20, 1926	Bud Fisher & Charles Bowers	Short Films Syndicate		
	A Kick For Cinderella	1926	Bud Fisher	Short Films Syndicate		Also known as “Kick for Cinderella”.
	Aroma Of The South Seas	1926	Bud Fisher	Short Films Syndicate		Re-released in color & sound in the 1930s, and again in the 1970s.
	‘Lots’ of Water	1926	Bud Fisher & Charles Bowers	Short Films Syndicate		Also known as “Lots of Water”.
	When Hell Freezes Over	March 6, 1926	Bud Fisher & Charles Bowers	Short Films Syndicate		Later retitled “When Hell Froze Over”. Re-released in color & sound in the 1930s, and again in the 1970s.
	Westward Whoa	August 1, 1926	Bud Fisher & Charles Bowers	Short Films Syndicate		Re-released in color & sound in the 1930s.
	Slick Sleuths	August 1, 1926	Bud Fisher & Charles Bowers	Short Films Syndicate		Re-released in color & sound in the 1930s, and again in the 1970s.
	Ups and Downs	August 15, 1926	Bud Fisher & Charles Bowers	Short Films Syndicate		
	Playing with Fire	September 1, 1926	Bud Fisher & Charles Bowers	Short Films Syndicate		
	Dog Gone	September 15, 1926	Bud Fisher & Charles Bowers	Short Films Syndicate		Later retitled “Dog Missing”. Redrawn colorized in the 1970s.
	The Big Swim	October 1, 1926	Bud Fisher & Charles Bowers	Short Films Syndicate		
	Mummy O' Mine	October 15, 1926	Bud Fisher & Charles Bowers	Short Films Syndicate		Later retitled “Egyptian Daze”. Redrawn colorized in the 1970s.
	A Roman Scandal	November 1, 1926	Bud Fisher & Charles Bowers	Short Films Syndicate		
	The Skating Instructors	1926	Bud Fisher	Short Films Syndicate		Also known as “Skating Instructors”. Re-released in color & sound in the 1930s, and again in the 1970s.
	The Globe Trotters	December 1, 1926	Bud Fisher & Charles Bowers	Short Films Syndicate		Re-released in color & sound in the 1930s.

== See also ==
- Mutt and Jeff live-action filmography
- Krazy Kat filmography
