= 1887 in animation =

- Years in animation: 1884 1885 1886 1887 1888 1889 1890
- Centuries: 18th century · 19th century · 20th century
- Decades: 1850s 1860s 1870s 1880s 1890s 1900s 1910s
- Years: 1884 1885 1886 1887 1888 1889 1890

Events in 1887 in animation.

== Events ==
- July 9: Publication of Animal Locomotion, a chronophotographic series by Eadweard Muybridge. It comprised 781 collotype plates, each containing up to 36 pictures of the different phases of a specific motion of one subject (over 20,000 images in total). The series is a result of Muybridge's interest in motion studies and his work on the zoopraxiscope. Historians and theoreticians have proposed that Muybridge's work on animal locomotion influenced a number of other artists, photographers and filmmakers, including Marcel Duchamp, Thomas Eakins, Walt Disney, among others.
- Specific date unknown: Étienne-Jules Marey created a large zoetrope with a series of plaster models based on his chronophotographs of birds in flight.

== Births ==
=== January ===
- January 16: Ralph Ince, American cartoonist, animator, actor, film director and screenwriter (worked as an animator under Winsor McCay), (d. 1937).

=== February ===
- February 19: Paul Terry, American cartoonist, screenwriter, film director and film producer (Terrytoons, Farmer Alfalfa, Mighty Mouse, Heckle and Jeckle, Deputy Dawg), (d. 1971).

=== June ===
- June 6: Charles Bowers, American comedian, animator and cartoonist (Barré Studio, Walter Lantz), (d. 1946).

=== August ===
- August 6: Oliver Wallace, English-American composer (Walt Disney Company), (d. 1963).

=== November ===
- November 23: Boris Karloff, British actor (narrator and voice of the title character in How the Grinch Stole Christmas, Baron Boris von Frankenstein in Mad Monster Party?), (d. 1969).

=== December ===
- December 23: Eric Blore, English actor and comedian (voice of Mr. Toad in The Adventures of Ichabod and Mr. Toad), (d. 1959).
- December 28: Walter Ruttmann, German film director and cinematographer (pioneer of abstract animation, directed the animated short film Lichtspiel: Opus I, the "oldest fully abstract motion picture known to survive, using only animated geometric forms, arranged and shown without reference to any representational imagery"; served as a special effects artist in the animated feature film The Adventures of Prince Achmed, making the film's moving backgrounds and magic scenes), (d. 1941).

== Sources ==
- Jacobs, Stephen (2011). Boris Karloff: More Than A Monster. Tomahawk Press. ISBN 978-0955767043.
