= 1885 in animation =

Events in 1885 in animation.

== Events ==
- Until Autumn 1885: From spring 1884 to autumn 1885, Eadweard Muybridge and his team produced over 100,000 images to document the motions of animals and humans. These images were primarily created at an outdoor studio located on the northeast corner of 36th and Pine streets on the grounds of the University of Pennsylvania. Subjects included animals from the veterinary hospital, as well as humans such as university professors, students, athletes, Blockley Almshouse patients, and local residents. Thomas Eakins briefly collaborated with Muybridge, though Eakins preferred using multiple exposures on a single negative, while Muybridge favored capturing motion with multiple cameras. Since 1879, Muybridge had been developing the zoöpraxiscope (animal action viewer), a projection device combining technologies from photography, the magic lantern, and the zoetrope to create cyclical animations of animal movement. He created painted sequences on the glass zoöpraxiscope discs, based on his motion-study photographs, to produce an early form of animation. Muybridge used these in lectures presented across the U.S. and Europe, contributing to photography and film's role in the "experience of time within modernity."

== Births ==
=== January ===
- January 28: Bert Green, British animator and comics artist (International Film Service), (d. 1948).

=== February ===
- February 22: Pat Sullivan, Australian animator, cartoonist, and film producer (Felix the Cat), (d. 1933).

=== April ===
- April 3: Bud Fisher, American cartoonist (creator of the comic strip Mutt and Jeff, credited as writer, animator, and director for the strip's animated adaptations released by the Fox Film Corporation, though most animation was done by Raoul Barré and Charles Bowers), (d. 1954).

=== August ===
- August 6: Harry O. Hoyt, American film director and screenwriter, pioneer in the use of stop-motion animation as special effects (director of The Lost World, noted for its use of stop-motion animation), (d. 1961).

=== September ===
- September 14: Ashton B. Collins Sr., American inventor and marketer (creator of the character Reddy Kilowatt; producer of the animated film Reddy Made Magic, produced and released by Walter Lantz Productions), (d. 1976).
- September 27: Clarence Wheeler, American composer (wrote music for Walter Lantz's and George Pal's cartoons, as well as Crusader Rabbit and Gumby), (d. 1966).

=== December ===
- December 22: Deems Taylor, American composer and master of ceremonies for Fantasia, (d. 1966).
