= Domestic Difficulties =

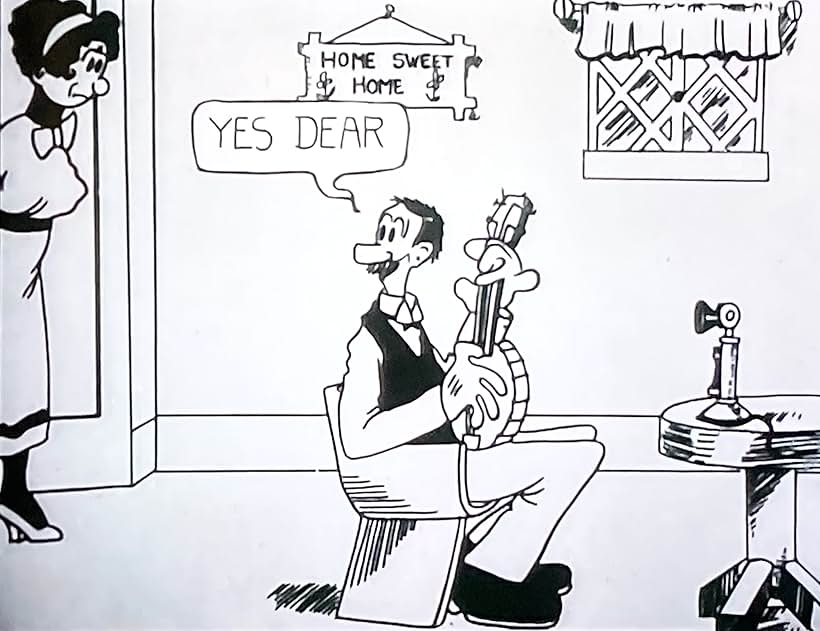
- Film still
- Directed by: Bud Fisher
- Story by: Bud Fisher
- Produced by: Raoul Barré; Charles Bowers
- Color process: Black and white
- Production companies: Pathe Freres; Mutt and Jeff Films; Bud Fisher Films
- Distributed by: Pathe Film Exchange
- Release date: 1916
- Running time: 8:27
- Country: United States
- Language: English

Domestic Difficulties is a 1916 silent animated short film featuring Mutt and Jeff. The film is one of the earliest animated adaptations of Bud Fisher's comic strip. The film features a humorous depiction of spousal abuse.

In the film, Mutt's wife is having a night out. She makes Mutt promise to stay in their apartment, but he instead heads to a bar with Jeff. He returns intoxicated and fails to enter the apartment unnoticed. His irritated wife is waiting for him. She beats up Mutt and then defenestrates him.

== Plot ==
Inside an apartment, Mutt is sitting down, strumming a banjo. Momentarily Mutt's wife comes to the scene. She tells Mutt she is going out, and she tells him to stay home. Mutt seems to give his word on the matter. Mutt then phone calls his friend Jeff and says they will go to a bar once his wife leaves. Mutt goes to bed, pretending to sleep. The wife checks into the bedroom and exits.

With the wife apparently gone, Mutt comes out of a bedroom window and climbs down a pipe on a wall where Jeff is waiting. Jeff suddenly spots the wife coming back, and therefore tells Mutt to return to the bedroom. Mutt is able to get back in bed on time to be seen by her there. When the wife resumes to her outing. Mutt climbs down the pipe again and walks away with Jeff. Little do the two men know that as they walk further away from the apartment, the wife surprisingly returns shortly.

Mutt and Jeff enter their intended bar. A few hours past midnight, they head to a park where they are supposed to part ways but just decide to sit down and relax. Because they are both intoxicated, they even see the park spinning around them.

Mutt and Jeff finally return to Mutt's apartment. Inside the building, Mutt's wife is sitting down irritated, and holding a rolling pin. Mutt attempts to climb up the pipe but his intoxication makes it very difficult, prompting him to just use the door. But before he could proceed, Mutt is unsure how his wife would greet him. He then tells Jeff to see if she is asleep.

Jeff enters the apartment and goes towards Mutt's room. Jeff knocks and opens the door, only to be pounded and knocked down by a rolling pin. Jeff, slightly annoyed, heads to the outside. Upon going out, Jeff lies to Mutt, saying the wife is fast asleep. As Mutt enters the apartment, the scene remains on the outside where Jeff is standing. Moments later, loud noises break out from the building, implying Mutt is taking a bad beating from the wife. When the noise stops, Jeff considers leaving. Suddenly, a bruised Mutt is defenestrated. Also thrown out of the window are some bricks, which all fall on Jeff.
