= 1891 in animation =

- Years in animation: 1888 1889 1890 1891 1892 1893 1894
- Centuries: 18th century · 19th century · 20th century
- Decades: 1860s 1870s 1880s 1890s 1900s 1910s 1920s
- Years: 1888 1889 1890 1891 1892 1893 1894

Events in 1891 in animation.

== Events ==
- Specific date unknown:
  - Charles-Émile Reynaud creates the film Pauvre Pierrot (Poor Pete). The film consists of 500 individually painted images, and originally lasted for about 15 minutes. It would not be exhibited to an audience until 1892.
  - Magic lantern slides with jointed figures set in motion by levers, thin rods, or cams and worm wheels were produced commercially and patented in 1891. A popular version of these "Fantoccini slides" had a somersaulting monkey with arms attached to a mechanism that made it tumble with dangling feet. Fantoccini slides are named after the Italian word for puppets like marionettes or jumping jacks.
  - George R. Tweedie gained fame in 1891 by running a popular magic lantern show, titled "Gossip about Ghosts". The show, which cost sixpence, consisted of fifty slides, each illustrating a story about ghosts or supernatural occurrences.
  - Two different British patents for magic lantern slides with moving jointed figures (fantoccini slides) were granted in 1891.

== Births ==
=== March ===
- March 3: Norman Spencer, American musician and songwriter (Leon Schlesinger Productions), (d. 1940).

=== July ===
- July 3: Doris Lloyd, English-American actress (voice of the Rose in Alice in Wonderland), (d. 1968).
- July 16: Lou Fleischer, American composer (Fleischer Studios) and actor (J. Wellington Wimpy in the Popeye cartoon "I Wanna Be a Lifeguard"), (d. 1985).

=== August ===
- August 21: Florencio Molina Campos, Argentine illustrator and painter (Walt Disney Animation Studios), (d. 1959).

=== September ===
- September 9: Vernon Stallings, American animator, writer and director (International Film Service, Bray Productions, Van Beuren Studios, Walt Disney Company), (d. 1963).

=== October ===
- October 1: Svend Methling, Danish actor and film director (The Tinderbox), (d. 1977).
- October 15: Burt Gillett, American animator and film director (Walt Disney Company, The Van Beuren Corporation, Walter Lantz Productions), (d. 1971).

=== November ===
- November 10: Carl W. Stalling, American composer, (Walt Disney Animation Studios, Looney Tunes), music arranger, voice actor, (voice of Mickey Mouse in The Karnival Kid), and co-inventor of the click track, (d. 1972).
- November 26: Scott Bradley, American composer, arranger, pianist, and conductor (Walt Disney Company, Metro-Goldwyn-Mayer cartoon studio, Iwerks Studio), (d. 1977).

== Sources ==
- Barrier, Michael (2007), "Building a Better Mouse, 1928-1933", The Animated Man: A Life of Walt Disney, University of California Press, ISBN 978-0520941663
- Koszarski, Richard (2008), "Cartoons in the City", Hollywood on the Hudson: Film and Television in New York from Griffith to Sarnoff, Rutgers University Press, ISBN 978-0813542935
- Neuwirth, Allan (2003), "Makin' Toons Croon: Those Musical Marvels Who Compose the Merry Melodies", Makin' Toons: Inside the Most Popular Animated TV Shows and Movies, Allworth Press, ISBN 978-1621531975
- Sigall, Martha (2005). "The Boys of Termite Terrace". Living Life Inside the Lines: Tales from the Golden Age of Animation. University Press of Mississippi. ISBN 9781578067497.
- Sito, Tom (2006), "Hollywood Labor, 1933–1941:The Birth of Cartoonists Unions", Drawing the Line: The Untold Story of the Animation Unions from Bosko to Bart Simpson, University Press of Kentucky, ISBN 978-0813138367
- Strauss, Neil (2002). "Tunes for Toons: A Cartoon Music Primer". In Goldmark, Daniel; Taylor, Yuval (eds.). The Cartoon Music Book. A Capella Books, an imprint of Chicago Review Press, Inc. ISBN 978-1569764121.
