= Matrimonial Agency =

Matrimonial Agency or Matrimonial agency may refer to:

- A dating agency, a business that matches couples interested in marriage or romance
- Matrimonial Agency (1952 film), a French film
- Matrimonial Agency (1953 film), an Italian comedy
- "Matrimonial Agency", a segment (directed by Fellini) of the Italian 1953 anthology film Love in the City
- The Matrimonial Agency, a 1913 short - see Mutt and Jeff live-action filmography
- "The Matrimonial Agency", a track from the comedy album Very Much Live In Canada by James Young
