= Dog Gone (1926 film) =

1926 film

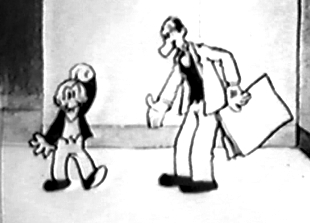
- Screenshot
- Directed by: Bud Fisher
- Story by: Bud Fisher
- Produced by: Dick Friel
- Color process: Black and white Color Systems, Inc. (Korean 1973 redrawn three-strip color edition with stock music added to add sound)
- Production companies: Associated Animators; Mutt and Jeff Films; Bud Fisher Films
- Distributed by: Short Film Syndicate
- Release date: September 15, 1926
- Running time: 6:45
- Country: United States
- Languages: Silent; English intertitles

Dog Gone is a silent animated short subject featuring Mutt and Jeff, the two title characters from Bud Fisher's comic strip. The cartoon is the eighth to last in the characters' long-running film series.

Originally in black-and white, this was one of the eleven Mutt and Jeff cartoons that were redrawn colorized in 1973 by Radio and Television Packagers.

== Plot ==
Mutt has been selected to judge a dog show. As a scheme, he tells Jeff to participate, assuring the latter will come out the victor.

Later, when the dog show is about to begin, Jeff puts on a dog suit before entering. At the contest, Mutt observes the other dogs. Mutt then approaches Jeff whom he momentarily declares the winner. This provoked great envy from the other dogs as they chase Jeff out of the scene. Mutt also runs to save his buddy.

Moments after being pursued, Jeff manages to lure the dogs into the container of a horse-drawn carriage. While he tries to get away, the carriage's driver catches and tosses him inside too.

The carriage arrives at a sausage plant. The driver then inserts the dogs through an opening on the plant's wall where they slide into a machine which turns them into sausages. Not wanting to share their fate, Jeff tries his best to avoid dropping in. After some trouble with a broom-wielding worker, Jeff partially falls into the machine. He is able to get out, and only his dog suit gets devoured. Meanwhile, Mutt eventually finds and enters the carriage. As a consequence, the driver, thinking there is one more dog left, obliviously passes Mutt into the machine. Mutt somehow gets stuck midway with legs sticking out. Jeff then pulls out his buddy, until they drop through the opening. When they are outside, Jeff notices Mutt's disfigured body, and laughs. Annoyed by this, Mutt pounds and knocks out Jeff.
