= De Beaumont =

De Beaumont may refer to:

- House of Beaumont, a Norman family
- de Beaumont Foundation, a US charitable foundation
- Charles de Beaumont (1902-1972), British Olympic fencer
