= 1886 in animation =

Events in 1886 in animation.

== Events ==
- Specific date unknown:
  - Henri Rivière created a form of shadow theatre at the Chat Noir under the name "ombres chinoises". This was a notable success, lasting for a decade until the cafe closed in 1897. He used back-lit zinc cut-out figures which appeared as silhouettes. Rivière was soon joined by Caran d'Ache and other artists, initially performing d'Ache's drama L’Epopee. From 1886 to 1896, Rivière created 43 shadow plays on a great variety of subjects from myth, history and the Bible. He collaborated with many different artists and writers, but made the illustrations for only 9 of the productions himself. He concentrated on improving the technical aspects of the production by using enamelling and lighting to create extremely delicate effects of light and colour. The Ombres evolved into numerous theatrical productions and had a major influence on phantasmagoria. The technique is considered a precursor to silhouette animation.
  - In 1886, Ottomar Anschütz developed the Electrotachyscope, an early device that displayed short motion picture loops with 24 glass plate photographs on a 1.5 meter wide rotating wheel that was hand-cranked to the speed of circa 30 frames per second. Different versions were shown at many international exhibitions, fairs, conventions and arcades from 1887 until at least 1894.

== Births ==
=== February ===
- February 8: Charlie Ruggles, American actor (voice of Benjamin Franklin in Ben and Me, Aesop in the Aesop and Son segments in The Adventures of Rocky and Bullwinkle and Friends), (d. 1970).

=== March ===
- March 2: Willis H. O'Brien, American special effects artist and animator (The Lost World, King Kong, The Son of Kong, Mighty Joe Young, The Black Scorpion, The Giant Behemoth), (d. 1962).
- March 6: Jam Handy, American film producer (A Case of Spring Fever), (d. 1983).
- March 12: Kay Nielsen, Danish-American painter, illustrator and animator (Fantasia, Sleeping Beauty, The Little Mermaid), (d. 1957).
- March 18: Edward Everett Horton, American character actor (narrator of Fractured Fairy Tales in The Adventures of Rocky and Bullwinkle and Friends), (d. 1970).

=== April ===
- April 13: Christian Rub, Austrian-American actor (voice of Geppetto in Pinocchio), (d. 1956).

=== June ===
- June 10: Sessue Hayakawa, Japanese actor (voice of the Mole in The Daydreamer), (d. 1973).

=== July ===
- July 6: Lou Skuce, Canadian cartoonist, illustrator and animator (animator for the animation studio Bray Productions), (d. 1951).
- July 31: Fred Quimby, American animation producer and journalist (Tom and Jerry), (d. 1965).

=== August ===
- August 31: Frank Marsales, Canadian composer (Warner Bros. Cartoons, Walter Lantz Studios), (d. 1975).

=== September ===
- September 11: Barnett Parker, British actor (voice of the title character in The Reluctant Dragon), (d. 1941).
- September 15: Jun'ichi Kōuchi, Japanese animator, and producer considered one of the fathers of anime (Namakura Gatana), (d. 1970).

=== October ===
- October 17: Spring Byington, American actress (model for Merryweather in Sleeping Beauty), (d. 1971).

=== November ===
- November 9: Ed Wynn, American actor and comedian (voice of the Mad Hatter in Alice in Wonderland), (d. 1966).
- November 27: John Foster, American animator and film director (International Film Service, Van Beuren Studios, Terrytoons), (d. 1959).

=== December ===
- December 14: Frederick Worlock, British-American actor (voice of Horace and Inspector Craven in 101 Dalmatians), (d. 1973).

=== Date unknown ===
- Frank Moser, American animation director and illustrator (co-founder of the animation studio Terrytoons, served as Terrytoons' most prolific animator), (d. 1964).

== Sources ==
- Harryhausen, Ray; Dalton, Tony (2008). A Century of Model Animation: From Méliès to Aardman. Aurum Press. ISBN 978-0-8230-9980-1.
- Priebe, Ken A. (2006). The Art of Stop-Motion Animation. Thompson Course Technology. ISBN 1-59863-244-2.
- Tobias, Conan (May 13, 2016). "Lou Skuce: The greatest cartoonist you've never heard of". The Globe and Mail. (excerpt from Tobias, Conan (2016). "Canada's Greatest Cartoonist: Lou Skuce's charmed and versatile career". Taddle Creek. 19 (2).)
