= Al Smith (cartoonist) =

American cartoonist (1902–1986)

- Born: Albert Schmidt; March 21, 1902 Brooklyn, New York, U.S.
- Died: November 24, 1986 (aged 84) Rutland, Vermont
- Area: Cartoonist
- Notable works: Mutt and Jeff (1932–1980); Al Smith Feature Service
- Awards: National Cartoonists Society Humor Comic Strip Award, 1968
- Spouse: Erna Anna Strasser (m. May 25, 1921)
- Children: 3

Albert Smith (né Schmidt; March 21, 1902 – November 24, 1986) was an American cartoonist whose work included a long run on the comic strip Mutt and Jeff. Comics historian R. C. Harvey postulates that Smith's nearly 50-year run on the strip was, at the time of Smith's retirement, a world record for longevity. Smith (and later his family members) also ran a comic strip syndication service — mainly serving weekly newspapers — from the 1950s until the late 1990s.

== Biography ==
Born Albert Schmidt in Brooklyn, New York, Smith was the art editor for the syndication department of the New York World from 1920 to 1930. From 1920 to 1933, Smith wrote and drew the syndicated cartoon From Nine to Five for the World's syndicate service (it moved to the United Feature Syndicate and ended in 1933). In 1960, he wrote of his life"

Born in Brooklyn, I became an orphan at age four. My boyhood was like an Horatio Alger story. Shoeshine boy after school, made 60 cents a week. Quit that to become butcherboy at $1 a week. Loved to draw and make people laugh. Could not afford lessons. Loved vaudeville. Might have tried acting career if I hadn’t married. ... I was too young for the First World War and too old for the Second.

Bud Fisher appeared to lose all interest in his Mutt and Jeff strip during the 1930s, and after Fisher's assistant Ed Mack died in 1932, the job of creating the strip fell to Al Smith. The strip retained Fisher's signature until his death, however, and not until December 7, 1954, was the strip signed by Smith.

In the introduction to Forever Nuts: The Early Years of Mutt & Jeff, comic strip historian Allan Holtz gave the following reason for the strip's longevity and demise:

The strip's waning circulation got a shot in the arm in the 1950s when President Eisenhower sang its praises, and then again in the 1970s when a nostalgia craze swept the nation. It took the 1980s, a decade focused on the here and now, and a final creative change on the strip when even Al Smith had had enough, to finally allow the strip the rest it had deserved for decades.

Smith continued to draw the strip until 1980, when George Breisacher took over for its final two years. Smith also drew the strips Rural Delivery and Cicero's Cat, the topper strip accompanying Mutt and Jeff.

Beginning in 1951, Smith ran his own syndicate, the Al Smith Feature Service, which distributed his own strips — Rural Delivery, Remember When, and The Bumbles — as well as those of other cartoonists. Smith served as president of the National Cartoonists Society in 1967–1969.

In 1980, Smith retired to Rutland, Vermont. He died on November 24, 1986, in a nursing home.

== Awards ==
Smith received the National Cartoonists Society's Humor Comic Strip Award in 1968 for his work on Mutt and Jeff.

== Al Smith Feature Service ==
Smith ran his syndication service — mainly serving weekly newspapers — from 1951 until his 1986 death, at which point it was supplying 25 features. (Early on, the syndicate partnered with the Chicago Tribune Syndicate.) With his death, management of the service was taken over by two of his daughters, with it lasting until c. 1999. The most successful (or at least longest-running) strips syndicated by the Al Smith Feature Service were Church Chuckles, Deems, Grubby, Pops, Those Were the Days, and Smith's own Rural Delivery.

=== Al Smith Service strips and panels ===
- Buffo by Howard Rands (1989–1991)
- The Bumbles by Al Smith (1982–1983)
- Captain Flame by Pat Boyette, Bruce Darrow, and Don Sherwood (1954–1958)
- Church Chuckles by Charles Cartwright (1959–1997)
- Citizen George by George Wolfe (1970–1973)
- Deems by Tom Oka (Tom Okamoto) (1951–1980)
- George by George Wolfe (1969)
- Ginger Blue by Al Carreno (1954)
- Grubby by Warren Sattler (1964–1997)
- Going West by Frank Thomas (1951–1954)
- Hossface Hank by Frank Thomas (1955–1964)
- Inky by Hal Borden (1961–1965)
- It Just So Happened by Kern Pederson (1978)
- Jason by Foster Moore (1993–1999)
- Jest For Laughs by Paul Fung Jr. (1978–1983)
- Just So Happened by Kern Pederson (1980)
- Li'l Peanut by Lou Paige (1951)
- Looking Around by Sid Hathaway (1970)
- Off Main Street by Joe Dennett (1951–1961)
- Phrog by George Albitz (1985–1986)
- Pixel by Frank Hill and Ted Mancuso (1985)
- Pops by George Wolfe (1962–1978)
- Remember When by Al Smith (1955)
- Rural Delivery by Al Smith (1951–1997) — titled "Jackie" in 1951–1952
- Sonny South by Courtney Alderson (1951–1972)
- Those Were the Days Art Beeman (1951–1983)

== See also ==
- Lincoln Newspaper Syndicate
