= De Beaumont Foundation =

Charitable foundation in Maryland, US

de Beaumont Foundation
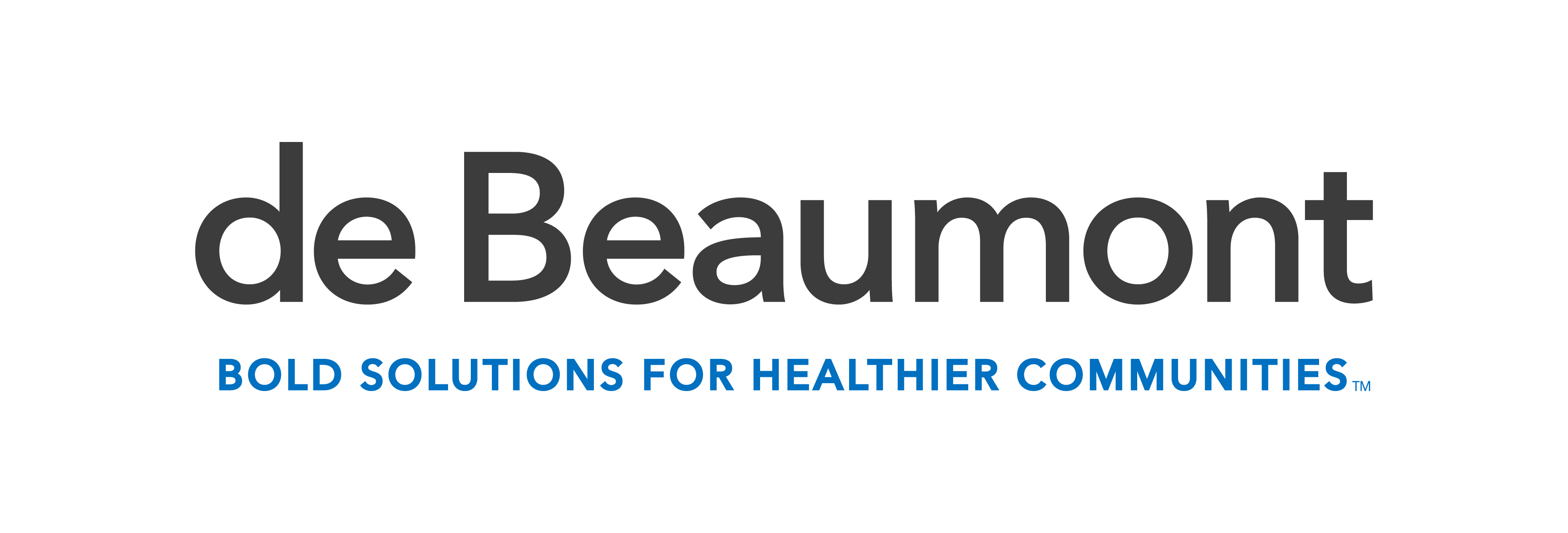
- Company type: Charitable foundation
- Industry: Public health and philanthropy
- Founded: 1998
- Founder: Pierre de Beaumont
- Headquarters: Bethesda, Maryland, United States
- Area served: United States
- Key people: Brian C. Castrucci, DrPH, MA; President & CEO
- Website: debeaumont.org

The de Beaumont Foundation is a charitable foundation in Bethesda, Maryland. It was created in 1998 by Pierre S. (Pete) de Beaumont, the founder of the Brookstone Company.

The foundation is led by Brian C. Castrucci, DrPH, MA, whose previous experience includes the Robert Wood Johnson Foundation, the Philadelphia Department of Health, the Texas Department of State Health, and the Georgia Department of Public Health.

== Major initiatives ==
- Public Health Workforce Interests and Needs Survey (PH WINS), a national survey of the state and local public health workforce
- CityHealth, a rating of U.S. cities on health-related policies
- PHRASES (Public Health Reaching Across Sectors)
- BUILD Health Challenge
- Practical Playbook
- BEAM (Building Expertise and Administration and Management), in partnership with the University of Miami
