= Pierre de Beaumont =

American mechanical engineer

Count Wolston Pierre Stuart de Beaumont (August 1, 1915 – December 4, 2010), aka Pete de Beaumont, was an American mechanical engineer and the co-founder of Brookstone, a chain of specialty stores.

== Early life ==
He was born in New York City, New York, the only child of Count François de Beaumont (died 1918), a French nobleman, and his American wife, the former Aedita Stuart (1889–1985), a daughter of U. S. diplomat Richard Stuart. The Beaumonts were divorced shortly after their son's birth, and the father was killed in action during World War I. Mother and son moved to the United States in 1919, where the mother pursued a brief career as a stage actress, using the name Gypsy Norman. She also appeared in at least one silent film, Fox Film Corp.'s Gentle Julia (1923), and wrote a three-act play called To Hell with Love.

On 25 October 1925, Aedita de Beaumont married Bud Fisher, the creator of the comic strip Mutt and Jeff, but the couple parted after four weeks. Since they were legally separated from 8 February 1927 until Fisher's death in 1954 and did not divorce, the rights to the strip passed to Aedita de Beaumont (as she continued to be known) and then to her son.

== Education and career ==
After attending private schools in the United States, Canada, and England, Pierre de Beaumont earned a bachelor's degree in engineering from Harvard University in 1938.

He began his career in the yacht building and automotive industries, working at companies including Packard and General Motors. He later worked for Apex Electrical Manufacturing and Bostitch Inc.

During World War II, he served in the United States Naval Reserve.

== Marriages ==
Pierre de Beaumont was married to:

- Barbara Anne Longstreth, whom he married on 29 August 1942. They divorced prior to 1960 and had no children.
- Mary Deland Kelley (née Robbins, 1933–2001), whom he married in 1960. By this marriage he had three stepchildren.

== Company ==
Mary and Pierre de Beaumont founded Brookstone in 1965 and sold it in 1980. The company is named for their farm in the Berkshires.

== Philanthropy ==
In 1998 Pierre de Beaumont founded the de Beaumont Foundation, which focuses on public health.

== Death ==
He died at his home in Manchester-by-the-Sea, Massachusetts.
