= George Wolfe (cartoonist) =

American cartoonist

- Born: January 19, 1911 New York City, U.S.
- Died: July 20, 1993 (aged 82) New Jersey, U.S.
- Area: Cartoonist
- Notable works: Pops
- Awards: National Cartoonist Society Gag Cartoon Award, 1969, 1973, 1975, 1976

George W. Wolfe (January 19, 1911 – July 20, 1993) was an American cartoonist. His comic strips Pops (1962–1978) and Citizen George (early 1970s) were syndicated by the Al Smith Feature Service. Wolfe received the National Cartoonist Society Gag Cartoon Award for 1969, 1973, 1975, and 1976 for his work. He spent most of his life in Glen Rock, New Jersey.
