= Mutt and Jeff live-action filmography =

In early July 1911, during the silent era of motion pictures, at David Horsley's Nestor Comedies in Bayonne, New Jersey, Al Christie began turning out a weekly one-reel live-action Mutt and Jeff comedy short, which was based on the comic strip. The series lasted 2 years ending in 1913. Approximately 59 shorts were produced. Below is a list of the films separated by years.

== 1911 ==
- Mutt and Jeff Break Into Society
- Mutt and Jeff Make the Feathers Fly
- Mutt and Jeff's Scheme That Failed
- Mutt and Jeff and the Unlucky Star
- Mutt and Jeff and the Lady Stenographer
- Mutt and Jeff Discover a Wonderful Remedy
- Mutt and Jeff Join the Opera Co
- Mutt and Jeff and the Blackhand
- Mutt and Jeff Spend a Quiet Day in the Country
- Mutt and Jeff as Reporters
- Mutt and Jeff and the Dog Catchers
- Mutt and Jeff and the Newsboys
- Mutt and Jeff and the Escaped Lunatic
- Mutt and Jeff and the German Band
- Mutt and Jeff and the Country Judge
- Mutt and Jeff in the Banking Business
- Mutt and Jeff and the Goldstein Burglary
- Mutt and Jeff Get Passes to the Ball Game
- Mutt and Jeff Make a Hit
- Mutt and Jeff at the Fortune Teller's
- Mutt and Jeff in a Matrimonial Affair
- Mutt and Jeff on the Job

== 1912 ==
- Mutt and Jeff Fall in Love
- Mutt and Jeff and Italian Strikers

== 1913 ==
- Mutt and Jeff (unknown title)
- Whaddaya Mean You're Contended
- Mutt and Jeff in Panama
- Mutt and Jeff (unknown title)
- Mutt and Jeff (unknown title)
- Mutt and Jeff (unknown title)
- Mutt and Jeff (unknown title)
- Mutt and Jeff (unknown title)
- The Mexican Problem
- The Hypnotist
- Mutt and Jeff (unknown title)
- A Substitute for Peroxide
- Johnny Reb's Wooden Leg
- Mutt's Marriage
- Mutt and Jeff (unknown title)
- The Ball Game
- The Merry Milkmaid
- The California Alien Land Law
- Baseball
- Mutt and Jeff (unknown title)
- Pickaninni's G-string
- Mutt and Jeff (unknown title)
- Mutt and Jeff (unknown title)
- Mutt Puts One Over
- The Sandstorm
- Mutt and Jeff in Mexico
- The Sultan's Harem
- Mutt's Moneymaking Scheme
- Mutt and Jeff in Turkey
- The Matrimonial Agency
- Mutt and Jeff in Constantinople
- Mutt and Jeff at Sea
- Mutt and Jeff at Sea: Part 2
- Mutt and Jeff (unknown title)
- Mutt and Jeff (unknown title)
- Mutt and Jeff (unknown title)

== See also ==
- Mutt and Jeff animated filmography
