= There It Is (film) =

1928 film

- Directed by: Harold L. Muller
- Starring: Charles R. Bowers; Kathryn McGuire; Melbourne MacDowell; Buster Brodie
- Distributed by: Educational Pictures
- Release date: 1928
- Running time: 19 minutes
- Country: United States

There It Is is a 1928 silent black-and-white comedy short directed by Harold L. Muller and starring Charles R. Bowers.

== Plot summary ==
The plot centers on Charley MacNeesha, a Scotland Yard detective who carries a stop motion-animated bug assistant called MacGregor in a matchbox. The pair travel to New York City to investigate the "Fuzz-Faced Phantom", who causes full-grown chickens to hatch from eggs, pots to float across rooms, and pants to dance of their own volition.

== Honors ==
In 2004, the film was selected for preservation in the National Film Registry by the Librarian of Congress for its "cultural, aesthetic, or historical significance".

== See also ==
- Treasures from American Film Archives
