= International Film Service =

American animation studio (1914–1921)

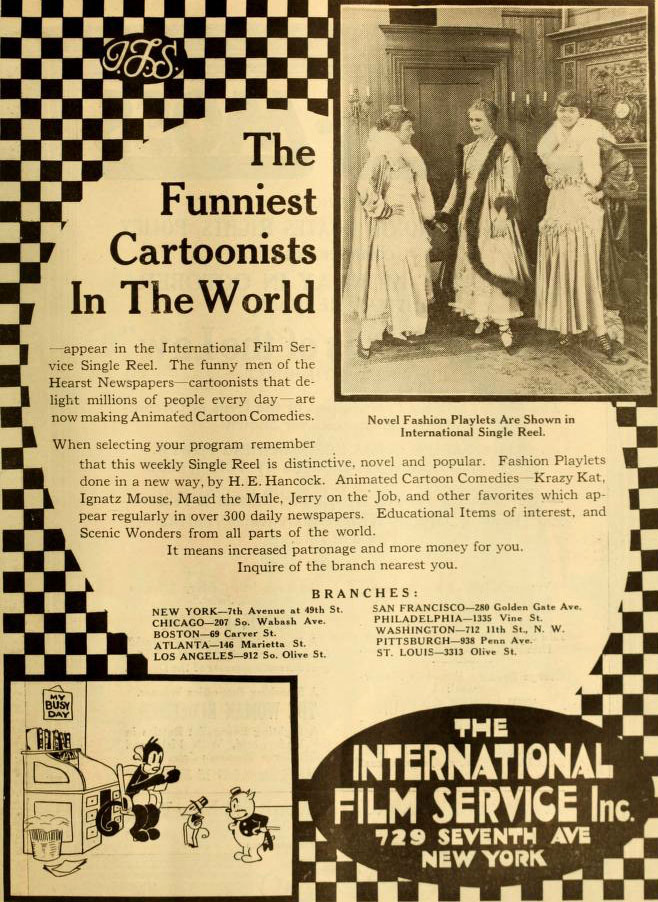
- International Film Service Advertisement (1916)
- Type: Private
- Industry: Film
- Founded: 1915
- Founder: William Randolph Hearst
- Defunct: 1921
- Fate: Closed
- Headquarters: New York City

International Film Service (IFS) was an American animation studio created to exploit the popularity of the comic strips controlled by William Randolph Hearst.

Despite their similar names "Hearst News" IFS, California, is not related to "International Film Service Company, Inc.", New York.

== History ==
In 1914, William Randolph Hearst expanded his International News Service wire syndicate into the International Picture Service, a syndicate formed to create newsreels, when newsreels were an entirely new idea. The success of the Hearst Newsreel led the media magnate to create International Film Service (IFS) in 1915. The purpose of this company was to translate Hearst's top comic strip properties into "living comic strips", to be added to the tail-end of the newsreels. For Hearst, the purpose of these cartoons was to be the same as the comics: to increase the circulation of his newspapers. The fact that former Hearst employees Winsor McCay, George McManus, and Bud Fisher were all doing very well with animated cartoons based on their Hearst comic strips those being: Little Nemo, The Newlyweds, and Mutt and Jeff.

To lead this new studio, Hearst did what he usually did: lured the best talent away from his competitors with the promise of the kind of huge salary only a Hearst could afford. The supervisor was Gregory La Cava, who had animated for the Barré Studio. La Cava was given director credit for all of the IFS cartoons. IFS cartoons were the first comic strip properties to give proper credit to the director and animators, as opposed to just the creator of the comic (their credit was in tiny print on the screen, but it was there). With him came William Nolan and Frank Moser, the fastest animators in the business. Hearst hired Raoul Barré, head of another animation studio, to animate his first series and teach the new hires how animation was done.

IFS operated eight different series from its inception through La Cava's organization skills. The quality, however, varied. IFS cartoons functioned as "living comic strips" with minimal motion and used dialogue balloons instead of the intertitles common to other animation studios at the time. The studio produced the long-running Krazy Kat series and served as an early employer for several animators, including Vernon Stallings, Walter Lantz, Ben Sharpsteen, Jack King, John Foster, Grim Natwick, Burt Gillett, and Isadore Klein.

World War I proved the death-knell for IFS. Hearst had been pursuing an aggressive pro-German position for decades under the assumption that German immigrants were the core of his newspaper consistency. As a result, International News Service lost its credibility. The spiraling debt this created forced Hearst to cut out his least-profitable business, and that was IFS. The entire staff was laid off on July 6, 1918, a date referred to in animation history as "Black Monday", but Hearst still cared about his animated properties, so he licensed them to John C. Terry's studio. When that studio folded a year later, he licensed his former competitor, Bray Productions, to make the IFS cartoons. The deal lasted from 1919 to 21, when the IFS-Bray agreement broke off, with the final few cartoons released in early 1921.

== Filmography ==
- Phables (1915-1916): directed by Gregory La Cava; animated by Raoul Barré
- Joys and Glooms (1916): directed by Gregory La Cava; animated by Frank Moser and Raoul Barré
- Krazy Kat (1916-1917): directed by Gregory La Cava; animated by Frank Moser, Leon Searl, Bill Nolan, Bert Green, Edward Grinham, Earl Klein, Isadore Klein, Al Rose
- The Katzenjammer Kids (1916-1918): directed by Gregory La Cava; animated by Gregory La Cava, John Foster, George (Vernon) Stallings, Isadore Klein; screenwritten by H.E. Hancock, Louis De Lorme
- Maud the Mule (1916): directed by Gregory La Cava; animated by Bert Green
- Happy Hooligan (1916-1919): directed by Gregory La Cava; animated by Frank Moser, Bill Nolan, Ben Sharpsteen, Jack King, Isadore Klein, Grim Natwick; screenwritten by Louis De Lorme
- Jerry on the Job (1916-1917): directed by Gregory La Cava; animated by Will Powers, Walter Lantz; screenwritten by H.E. Hancock, Louis De Lorme
- Bringing Up Father (1916-1917): directed by Gregory La Cava (No source given, newspaper articles differ); animated by Frank Moser, Bert Green, Edward Grinham, Grim Natwick; screenwritten by Louis De Lorme
- Abie the Agent (1917): directed by Gregory La Cava
- Judge Rummy (1918-1919): directed by Gregory La Cava; animated by Gregory La Cava, Grim Natwick, Jack King, Burton Gillett, Frank Moser, and Isadore Klein
- Tad's Indoor Sports (1920-1921): directed by Gregory La Cava; animated by Bill Nolan and Walter Lantz

== Distributors ==
- Vitagraph Studios (1916-1917)
- Pathé (1916-1917)
- Educational Pictures (1918-1919)
- Winkler Pictures (1919-1925)

== Staff ==
- Producer: William Randolph Hearst (1916-1918), John C. Terry (1918-1919)
- Directors: Gregory La Cava
- Animators: Raoul Barré, Frank Moser, Leon A. Searl, Bert Green (1916–18), Bill Nolan (1916–18), Edward Grinham, Ben Sharpsteen, Jack King (1920–21), Will Powers, Walter Lantz, John Foster, George (Vernon) Stallings (1916–18), F. M. Follett, Leighton Budd, Hal Coffman, Grim Natwick (1916–18), Burton Gillett, Isadore Klein (1916–18), Earl Klein (1917-17), Al Rose (1916–17), George Rufle (c. 1916)
- Story: Tom Powers, Louis De Lorme, H. E. Hancock
