= 1894 in animation =

Events in 1894 in animation.

== Films released ==
- December: Autour d'une cabine (Around A Cabin), directed by Émile Reynaud. It is an animated film made of 636 individual images hand painted in 1893.The film showed off Reynaud's invention, the Théâtre Optique. It was shown at the Musée Grévin from December 1894 until March 1900.

== Births ==
=== February ===
- February 14: Jack Benny, American actor, comedian, vaudevillian, and violinist (portrayed and voiced himself in The Mouse that Jack Built, and The Mad, Mad, Mad Comedians), (d. 1974).
- February 26: Olga Khodataeva, Russian animation director, animator, art director, and screenwriter (China in Flames, One of Many, The Samoyed Boy, The Little Organ, Sarmiko, The Flame of the Arctic), (d. 1968).

=== March ===
- March 12: Carl Meyer, American actor (voice of Smack in Mr. Bug Goes to Town), animator and animation writer (Fleischer Brothers, Paramount Animation), (d. 1972).
- March 18: Stuart Buchanan, American voice actor, casting director, radio and television producer, and educator (voiced the Huntsman in Snow White and the Seven Dwarfs (1937), Goofy in The Mickey Mouse Theater of the Air , and an unnamed flight attendant in Saludos Amigos), (d. 1974).
- March 26:
  - Richard Loederer, American comics writer, comics artist and animation art director (worked for Amedee J. Van Beuren), (d. 1981).
  - Will Wright, American actor, (voice of Friend Owl in Bambi), (d. 1962).
- March 28: Wallace Carlson, American animator, film director and comics artist (worked for J.R. Bray, founder of Carlson Studios), (d. 1967).

=== June ===
- June 10: Bill Nolan, American animator, director and animation writer (Pat Sullivan, Margaret J. Winkler, Walter Lantz, Metro-Goldwyn-Mayer cartoon studio), (d. 1954).

=== July ===
- July 7: Alexander de Seversky, Russian-American aviation pioneer, inventor, and influential advocate of strategic air power (technical consultant and live-action commentator in the animated feature film Victory Through Air Power), (d. 1974).
- July 14: Dave Fleischer, American animator, film producer and director (co-founder of Fleischer Studios, Koko the Clown, Betty Boop, Popeye, Let's All Go to the Lobby), (d. 1979).

=== August ===
- August 19: Ralph A. Wolfe, American comic book artist and animator (Fleischer Studios, Warner Bros. Cartoons, Walt Disney Animation Studios), (d. 1985).

=== September ===
- September 12: Billy Gilbert, American comedian and actor (voice of Sneezy in Snow White and the Seven Dwarfs, and Willie the Giant in Fun and Fancy Free), (d. 1971).
- September 24: Billy Bletcher, American voice actor (voice of Pete and the Big Bad Wolf, the Pincushion Man in Balloon Land, Owl Jolson's disciplinarian father in I Love to Singa, the Menacing Spider in Bingo Crosbyana, Spike the Bulldog and Tom Cat in Tom and Jerry, Papa Bear in The Three Bears, and the Villainous Wolf in Little Red Riding Rabbit), (d. 1979).

=== December ===
- December 8: E.C. Segar, American comics artist (creator of Popeye), (d. 1938).
- December 29: Harry E. Lang, American actor (voice of Tom in a few Tom and Jerry cartoons), (d. 1953).
