= Barré Studio =

Animation studio

- Type: Animation studio
- Industry: Animation
- Founded: 1914; 112 years ago
- Founder: Bill Nolan, Raoul Barré
- Defunct: 1923

Barré Studio was among the first film studios dedicated to animation and founded by Raoul Barré and William Nolan in 1914. The studio pioneered some early animation processes, including mechanical perforation of cels and animating special effects on glass.

The studio began with advertising films (among the first animated films used to sell something), then got a series with Edison called The Animated Grouch Chaser. The series was mostly live-action with a few animated inserts. The studio also put out the Phables and The Boob Weekly cartoons. Animators included Frank Moser, Gregory La Cava, George Stallings, Tom Norton and Pat Sullivan, all of whom got their starts here. Rube Goldberg was the writer for The Boob Weekly.

In 1916, William Randolph Hearst founded International Film Service, and hired all of Barré's animators to work for him, including Bill Nolan. Soon afterward, Barré was contacted by Charles Bowers, who had been animating Mutt and Jeff for a year. The series was doing so well that it had outgrown Bowers' studio. A partnership was formed: Bowers' animators and series worked on in Barré's studio. The result was the Bud Fisher Film Corporation, named for the originator Bud Fisher of the Mutt and Jeff comic strip. It was known in the industry as the Barré-Bowers Studio.

Fisher took all public credit for the cartoons, while Barré supervised the animators and Bowers handled the books. He "handled" the books so well, in fact, that he ruined the company: Barré quit in 1918 to avoid getting charged as an accomplice; Bowers was fired in 1919 and 1921. This left Fisher in charge. Barré-Bowers went bankrupt in 1923.

Besides Barré and Bowers, directors at their studio included Manny Gould and Dick Friel. Animators included C. T. Anderson, Clarence Rigby, George Stallings, Ted Sears, Mannie Davis, Burt Gillett, Dick Huemer, Tom Palmer, Ben Sharpsteen, Bill Tytla, Albert Hurter, Carl Lederer, F. M. Follett, Isadore Klein, Milt Gross, Walter Lantz and George Ruffle.

== Filmography ==
Series

- Animated Grouch Chasers (1915)
- Phables (1915-1916)
- The Boob Weekly (1916)
- Mutt and Jeff (1916-1926)

One-Shots

- Cartoons On A Yacht (1915)
