= 1890 in animation =

Events in 1890 in animation.

== Events ==
- Specific date unknown:
  - Charles-Émile Reynaud creates the film Le Clown et ses chiens (The Clown and His Dogs) for his Théâtre Optique. It would not be exhibited to an audience until 1892.

== Births ==
=== March ===
- March 19: Gayne Whitman, American actor (occasional voice of Barney Bear), (d. 1958).

=== April ===
- April 13: Gene Rodemich, American pianist and orchestrator (Van Beuren Studios), (d. 1934).
- April 26: Thoralf Klouman, Norwegian satirical illustrator and actor (produced the animated film Admiral Palads (1917), about the American president Woodrow Wilson), (d. 1940).

=== June ===
- June 12: Junius Matthews, American actor (voice of Archimedes in The Sword in the Stone, Rabbit in the Winnie the Pooh franchise), (d. 1978).

=== July ===
- July 15: Arch Heath, American cartoonist, animator, film director and screenwriter (general manager of production at the Eastern Film Corporation), (d. 1945).
- July 20: Verna Felton, American actress (voice of Mrs. Jumbo and the Elephant Matriarch in Dumbo, Fairy Godmother in Cinderella, Queen of Hearts in Alice in Wonderland, Aunt Sarah in Lady and the Tramp, Flora and Queen Leah in Sleeping Beauty, Pearl Slaghoople in The Flintstones, Winifred in The Jungle Book), (d. 1966).

=== August ===
- August 12: George Debels, a.k.a. Joe Stan, Belgian-Dutch animator, illustrator and comics artist (De Dierenmars), (d. 1973).
- August 16: Grim Natwick, American animator and film director (Fleischer Studios, designed Betty Boop, worked for Ub Iwerks, Walter Lantz, Walt Disney Animation Studios, UPA, Richard Williams), (d. 1990).
- August 29: Charles Thorson, Canadian political cartoonist, character designer (Snow White, Bugs Bunny), children's book author and illustrator (The Captain and the Kids), (d. 1966).

=== November ===
- November 1: Byington Ford, American cartoonist, theatrical director and businessman (director of the Animated Film Corporation in San Francisco), (d. 1985).

=== Date uncertain ===
- Walter Hoban, American cartoonist (created the comic strip Jerry on the Job, which received several animated adaptations by the animation studio Bray Productions), (d. 1939).
- K-Hito, Spanish caricaturist, animator, sports journalist, film producer, publisher and comics writer and artist (Francisca, la mujer fatal, La Vampiresa Morros de Fresa), (d. 1984).

== Sources ==
- Mazurkewich, Karen (1999). Cartoon Capers: The History of Canadian Animators. McArthur & Company Publishing. ISBN 1-55278-093-7.
