= John P. Young =

American newspaper editor and writer

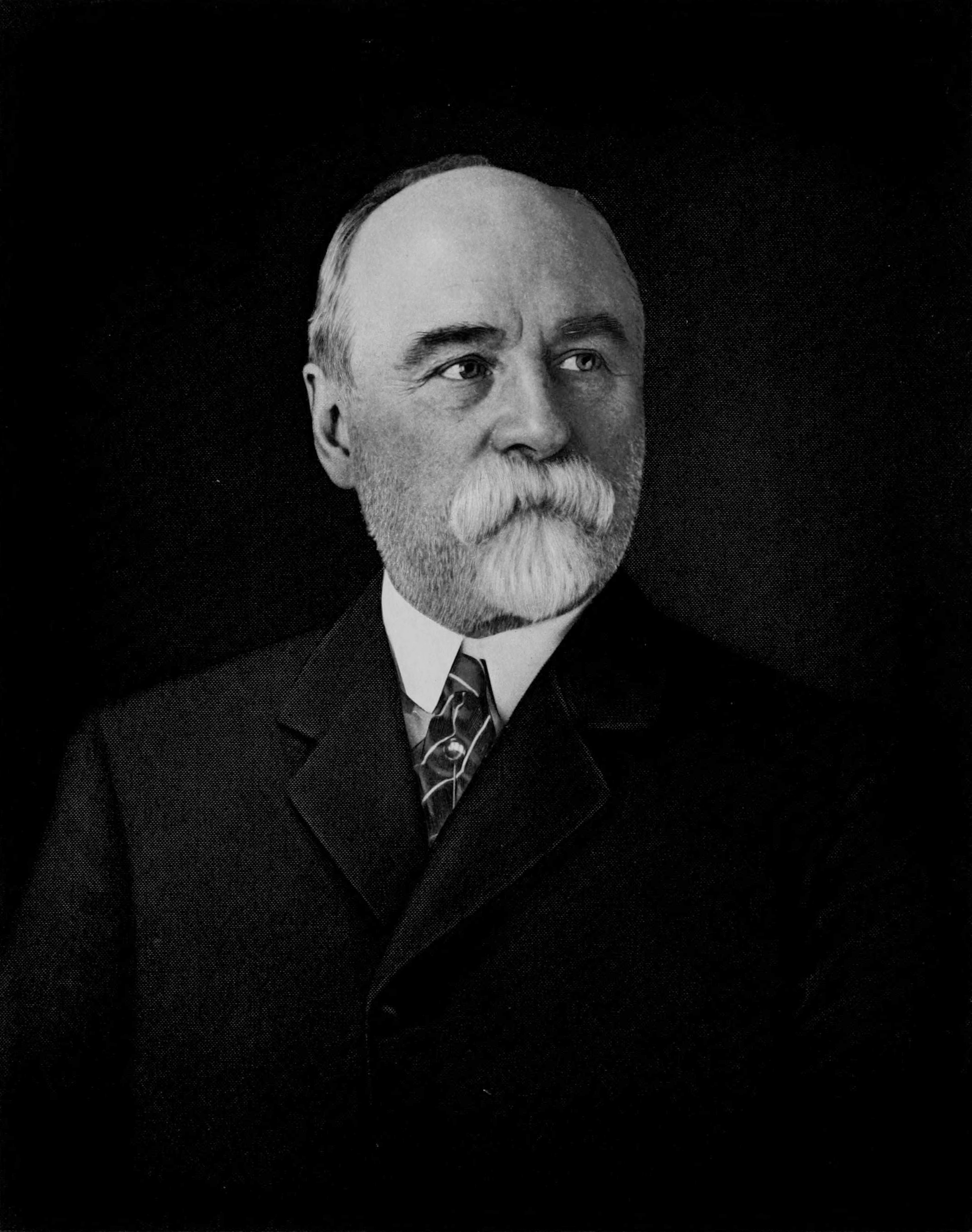
- Born: August 9, 1849; Philadelphia
- Died: April 23, 1921 (aged 71); San Francisco
- Occupations: Newspaper editor, writer

Signature
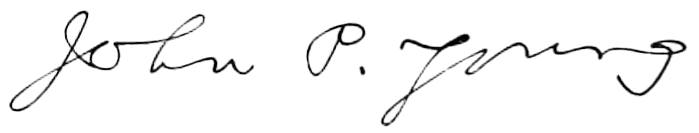

John Philip Young (August 9, 1849 – April 23, 1921) was an American newsman and writer. He was managing editor of the San Francisco Chronicle for 44 years, and wrote variously on history, economics, and journalism. His books include the two-volume San Francisco: A History of the Pacific Coast Metropolis (1913), and Journalism in California (1915). He was also a founding member and treasurer of the Commonwealth Club of California.

== Biography ==
Young was born in Philadelphia and at age 16 ran away from home and enlisted in the Navy. His parents organized his release while he was on his first cruise, and he then spent four years working in a Philadelphia store. He then moved out west, first to Arizona, then San Diego, where he became business manager and later an editor of the San Diego Union. In 1873 he went to Washington, D.C. for four years, where he was city editor of the Washington Chronicle. He moved back to California in 1877, joining the Chronicle in April of that year. After covering the 1877–78 session of the California legislature for the Chronicle, he was appointed managing editor.

He authored several books and articles on economics, history, and journalism. He was an ardent supporter of American protectionism, which he explored in his 1899 book Protection and Progress, and in 1904 was elected an honorary member of the American Protective Tariff League. Other works include a two-volume history of San Francisco, and The Growth of Modern Trusts, the latter praised by president Theodore Roosevelt as performing a genuine service to the country. He was also an advocate of bimetallism in the debate against monometallism, and in 1895 published in the pages of the Chronicle his "Bimetallism and Monometallism", a 25-chapter, 63-column exploration of the issue, an amount of space noted by a British magazine as "probably unprecedented in newspaper literature."

In 1884 he married Georgina M. Brown of St. Louis. He died at the age of 71 on April 23, 1921, at his home in San Francisco, after suffering a stroke of paralysis 10 days earlier.
