= Brookstone =

Chain of retail stores

- Type: Private
- Industry: Retail
- Founded: Peterborough, New Hampshire, United States 1965
- Headquarters: Merrimack, New Hampshire, United States
- Number of locations: 34 (October 2018)
- Key people: Steven Goldsmith (CEO)
- Owner: Sanpower Corp.
- Website: www.brookstone.com

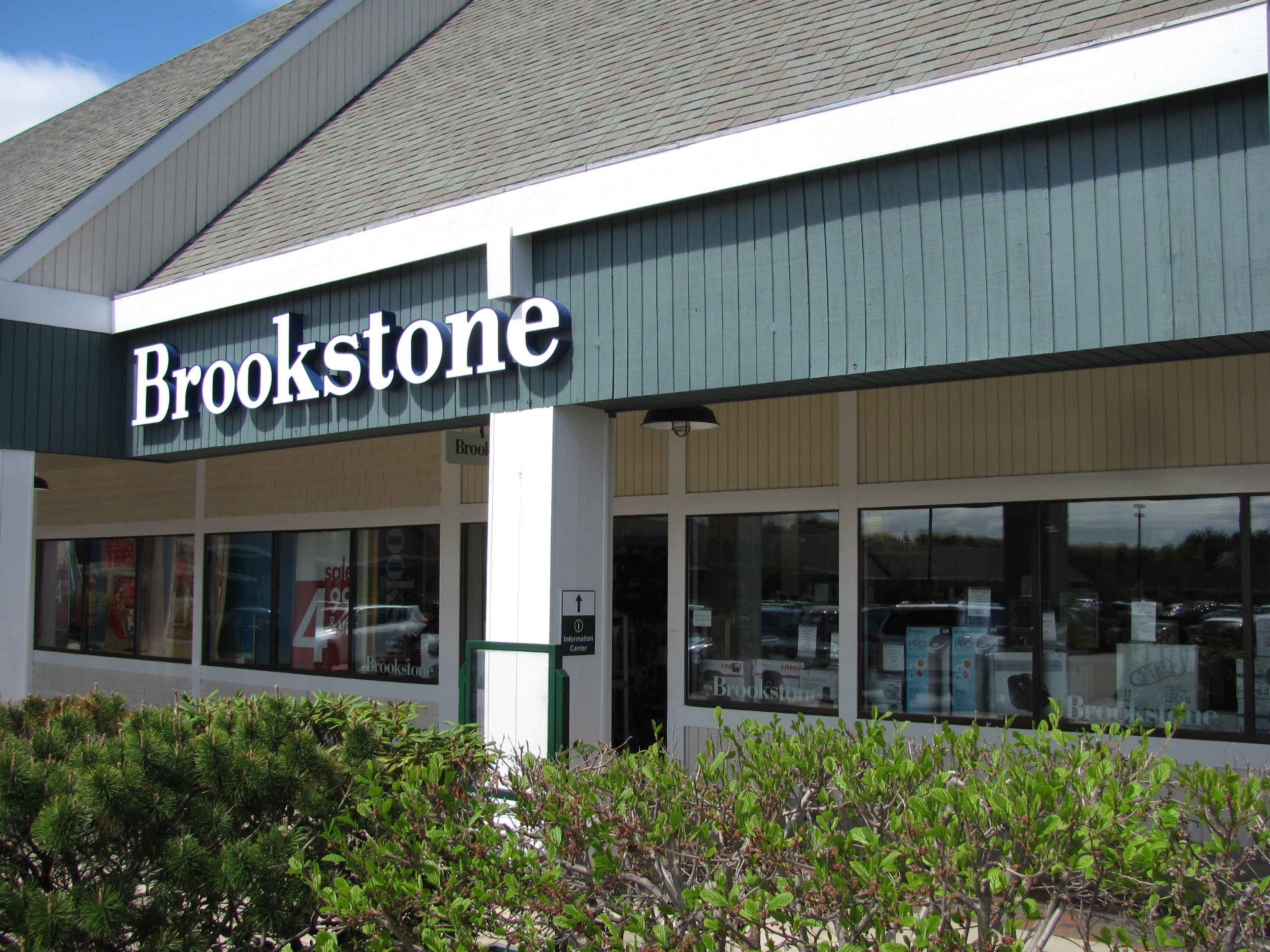
A Brookstone store in Kittery, Maine

Brookstone is a chain of retail stores in the United States and China. It was founded as a mail-order business in 1965, when it started selling items, such as dental clamps and other specialty tools. Its first physical location opened in 1973 in Peterborough, New Hampshire. The company's headquarters are currently located in Merrimack, New Hampshire.

Brookstone now sells a wide assortment of products, including remote control helicopters and drones, alarm clocks and smartwatches, massage chairs, speakers, iPads and tablet accessories, blankets, pillows, and many other lifestyle items. Most of the products sold at Brookstone stores are designed by the company and sold under its own brand (white brand). Brookstone stores are generally found in airports and Brookstone also operates an online webstore. The company is distinctive in that it allows customers to play with any product in the store before making a purchase.

On April 3, 2014, the company filed for bankruptcy under Chapter 11 of the Bankruptcy Code in the United States Bankruptcy Court for the District of Delaware; in its first-day motions on April 4, the company sought permission to be acquired by the parent of Spencer Gifts. The company's stores were to remain open and running as usual during the bankruptcy process.

In June 2014, Brookstone was purchased by the Chinese investment firm, Sailing Capital, and Chinese conglomerate, Sanpower, for more than $173 million. The company emerged from bankruptcy in July 2014.

On August 2, 2018, Brookstone announced the closing of all their mall locations to focus on their website and airport locations, days after the company was considering filing for bankruptcy. On August 6, 2018, Brookstone filed for Chapter 11 bankruptcy and announced the closure of all 101 U.S. store locations.

== History ==
=== Founding ===
Pierre de Beaumont and his wife, Mary, began Brookstone in 1965, for $500. After learning accounting by correspondence, they began mailing catalogs to thousands of hobbyists. It was based in their Berkshires farmhouse, and they named the company after their farm.

Pierre de Beaumont was known as a tinkerer, and Brookstone's start and initial product base was driven around the purpose of making hard-to-find and useful items/tools. Brookstone started out as a catalog company, with local and long-distance catalog circulations that initially were introduced from a classified ad in a Popular Mechanics magazine in 1965. The demand for the unique products that Brookstone offered developed into a strong consumer, demand-based system that led to a need for specific Brookstone retail stores.

=== 1970s and 80s ===
Brookstone opened its first store in 1973 in New Hampshire. Due to the growing success of this store, many more followed during the next decade; however the customer-base for Brookstone stores were almost exclusively limited to those who received their distributed catalogs.

In March 1980, the Quaker Oats Company bought Brookstone with a $9 million stock exchange.

Brookstone fixed their customer base issue in the 1980s by introducing products in their stores that were not available in their catalogs; however, they still focused on unique tools and household goods. New items included products focused on travel, leisure, technology, audio, and games, and even developed a hands-on experience for almost all of their products. Due to the introduction of these new products, more customers developed an interest and sales gradually increased through the 1980s.

Looking to reduce debt, Quaker announced in August 1986 they would sell off their specialty retailing group, which included Brookstone as well as Jos. A. Bank Clothiers and Eyelab. Brookstone was purchased by an investment group including Greylock Management, Duncan, Cook and Co. and Fidelity Ventures, as well as Brookstone management.

In 1987, sales were posted at $93 million, which Brookstone considered a record. Their income, though, was at a loss of $9.7 million, and this situation continued through the late 1980s. Even though sales were increasing, Brookstone decided to focus on ideas of creating products catered towards women, and converting their stores' overall look driven towards a "men's clubhouse" feeling. Store arrangements were also changed to provide a less crowded, and more comfortable atmosphere. These efforts proved to be successful as an annual positive income was made at $4.9 million, with sales at $104.6 million in the early '90s.

Even with this success, Brookstone wanted more improvements, and decided to sack its computer programming staff that worked on their retail computer system. With needs in the retail scene changing, their initial, already developed retail software systems became useful, which ended up making Brookstone's remaining staffed programmers unnecessary, which developed into strong annual savings for Brookstone.

=== 1990s ===
In 1992, Brookstone opened kiosks that offered Brookstone items, but contained a limited selection of items. The kiosks were separated from the Brookstone stores, but were contained in the same mall. These kiosks also proved to be a successful business venture with an overall sales jump to $143.7 million.

By 1993, Brookstone operated around 100 stores in the US. Sales in these stores accounted for 85 percent of their annual revenue, with their still existing magazine, and kiosk sales contributing to the remaining 15 percent.

At this time, Brookstone only had two distribution centers, and decided to add a brand-new one in 1994 in Missouri, which resulted in faster shipments of their products to customers at no cost. By the late 1990s, Brookestone had 150 stores in 32 states, more than 100 kiosks, and an online retail store. Brookstone evolved into a multimillion-dollar company while retaining a strong grip on their original theme of offering unique and interesting products. Over the course of the 1990s, Brookstone moved away from selling tools and similar items, and began to focus more on electronics.

=== 21st century ===
In the mid-2000s, Brookstone stores were redesigned with tile floors and track lighting.

In January 2014, Brookstone missed an interest payment to bondholders on their debt of $125 million from the original Osim/Childs/Temasek buyout. As a result, Brookstone began to consult with firms including Hilco Global and Tiger Capital Group LLC about buying or investing in the company. On March 26, 2014, it was reported that the mall retailer Spencer Spirit Holdings, the parent of Spencer Gifts, would look to acquire Brookstone out of Bankruptcy for $120 million. On April 3, 2014, Brookstone filed for bankruptcy as expected.

In June 2014, Brookstone was purchased by the Chinese investment firm Sailing Capital and Chinese conglomerate Sanpower for more than $173 million. The company emerged from Bankruptcy in July 2014.

In August 2018, Brookstone filed for its second bankruptcy in 4 years, subsequently announcing the closure of all storefronts in shopping malls. Airport stores and their website will stay.

== Competition ==
Brookstone is in competition with The Sharper Image, a similar company that filed for bankruptcy in 2008, but continues to run its online storefront and catalog. Another competitor was Hammacher Schlemmer, which began as a New York hardware store with a catalog.

== Controversy ==
=== Employment ===
In November 2009, Brookstone received media coverage over the firing of Massachusetts man Peter Vadala. Vadala allegedly disagreed with a co-worker's homosexuality in a Boston store, after she made references to her same-sex fiancee, seeking Vadala's congratulations. Brookstone asserts it has a zero-tolerance policy on discriminatory harassment. Vadala asserted that Christians are "obviously" excluded from that discriminatory harassment policy in a Fox & Friends interview.

=== Frog-O-Sphere ===
The treatment of animals in Brookstone's Frog-O-Sphere, an aquarium-like self-cleaning tank which contains two African dwarf frogs, has caused an animal rights controversy. In November 2009, PETA released an undercover video investigation allegedly depicting inhumane treatment of frogs prior to their use in Frog-O-Spheres at their supplier, Wild Creations. PETA alleges that frogs are raised in unfiltered water, infrequently fed, and suffering from fungal infections. Brookstone has denied these charges.

== See also ==
- Retail apocalypse
- List of retailers affected by the retail apocalypse
