= Bud Fisher =

American cartoonist (1885–1954)

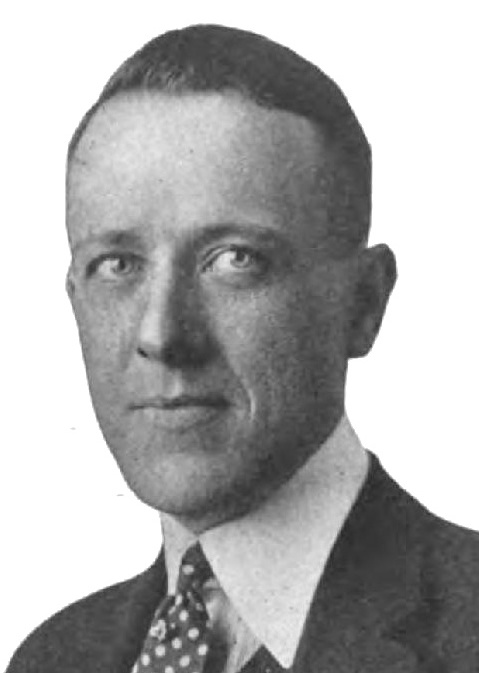
- Fisher in 1915
- Born: Harry Conway Fisher; April 3, 1885 Chicago, Illinois
- Died: September 7, 1954 (aged 69) New York City
- Notable works: Mutt and Jeff
- Spouses: Pauline Margaret Welch (m. 1912; div. 1917) Aedita de Beaumont (m. 1925; sep. 1925)

Harry Conway "Bud" Fisher (April 3, 1885 – September 7, 1954) was an American cartoonist who created Mutt and Jeff, the first successful daily comic strip in the United States.

== Early life ==
Born in Chicago, Illinois, the son of a merchant, Fisher attended public high school and then studied for three years at the University of Chicago. After a short-lived attempt at prizefighting, he began painting comic signs for window displays before becoming a layout person in the production department of the San Francisco Chronicle, where he soon became a cartoonist.

He introduced A. Mutt, the comic strip that would be better known by its later title, Mutt and Jeff, on November 15, 1907, on the sports pages of the San Francisco Chronicle. The featured character had previously appeared in sports cartoons by Fisher, but was unnamed. Fisher had approached his editor, John P. Young, about doing a regular strip as early as 1905, but was turned down. According to Fisher, Young told him, "It would take up too much room, and readers are used to reading down the page, and not horizontally." During this time, newspaper cartoons appeared in a single-panel format. Fisher innovated by telling a cartoon gag in a sequence, or strip, of panels, creating the first American comic strip to successfully pioneer that since-common format. The concept of a newspaper strip featuring recurring characters in multiple panels on a six-day-a-week schedule actually had been created by Clare Briggs with A. Piker Clerk four years earlier, but that short-lived effort did not inspire further comics in a comic-strip format. As comics historian Don Markstein explained,

Fisher's comic strip was very similar to A. Piker Clerk, which cartoonist Clare Briggs ... had done in the very same daily format for The Chicago American in 1903. But tho Fisher was born in Chicago, it's unknown whether or not he ever saw the Briggs strip, so let's give him the benefit of the doubt and say he had an idea. Despite the Briggs primacy, A. Mutt is considered the first daily strip because it's the one that sparked a trend in that direction, which continues to this day.

== Mutt and Jeff ==
Mutt and Jeff gained such popularity that Fisher, who was able to claim copyright to the characters, received an offer to produce it for the San Francisco Examiner, owned by William Randolph Hearst. The move to the Hearst Corporation chain exposed the strip to a multitude of new readers across the United States.

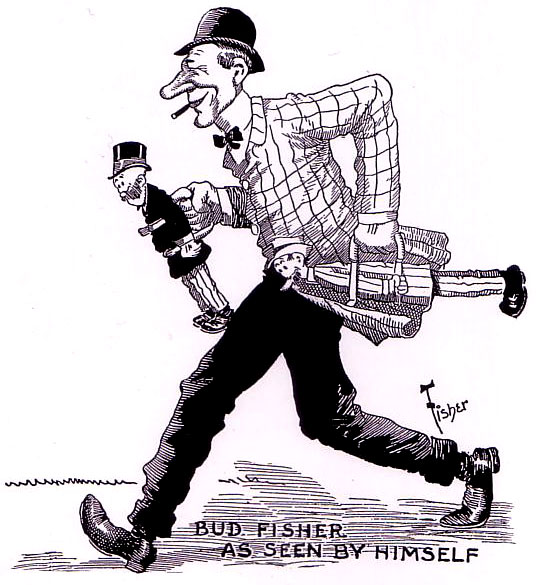

In 1911, Nestor Studios of New Jersey acquired the right to make Mutt and Jeff short film comedies, after which Fisher decided he could make more money controlling film production himself. In 1913, he created the Bud Fisher Film Corporation and signed a deal with American Pathé. They made 36 Mutt and Jeff short comedies in 1913, but production ceased for two years when Fisher's copyright was challenged. Once the courts upheld Fisher's copyright claim, the comic strip was syndicated nationwide, and between 1916 and 1926, his film production company created another 277 Mutt and Jeff film productions. On these film projects, Fisher is almost exclusively credited as the writer, animator and director, although the majority of animation was by Raoul Barré and Charles Bowers, and often the plots were adaptations of popular stories and fairy tales, such as A Kick for Cinderella (1925).

Mutt and Jeff was also published in comic book form. The income from multiple uses of his characters made Fisher a wealthy man. In 1932, he authorized Al Smith to produce the strip under his supervision. Smith drew Mutt and Jeff for 48 years. When Fisher died in 1954, Smith began signing his own name and continued to draw the strip until 1980 when George Breisacher took over for its final two years.

== Personal life ==
On April 20, 1912, Fisher eloped with Pauline Margaret Welch, a vaudeville actress from Baltimore. They were divorced in 1917.

On October 25, 1925, Fisher married Aedita de Beaumont, former wife of Count François de Beaumont. The couple parted after four weeks but never divorced. After Fisher's death, ownership of the strip passed to Aedita de Beaumont, and on her death in 1985 to her son from her earlier marriage, Pierre de Beaumont (1915–2010).

Fisher acquired a large stable of Thoroughbred racehorses. In 1924, his horse Nellie Morse became the fourth filly (out of only six total as of 2022) to win the Preakness Stakes. That same year, his colt Mr. Mutt finished second in the Belmont Stakes.

Fisher died September 7, 1954, of cancer at age 69, at Roosevelt Hospital in New York City. He lived at the time at 383 Park Avenue. and was buried in the Woodlawn Cemetery in The Bronx, New York City.

== Bibliography ==
- Fisher, Bud, " 'Here's How!'—Says Bud," Photoplay, July 1920, p. 58.
