= Charles Bowers =

American cartoonist and comedian

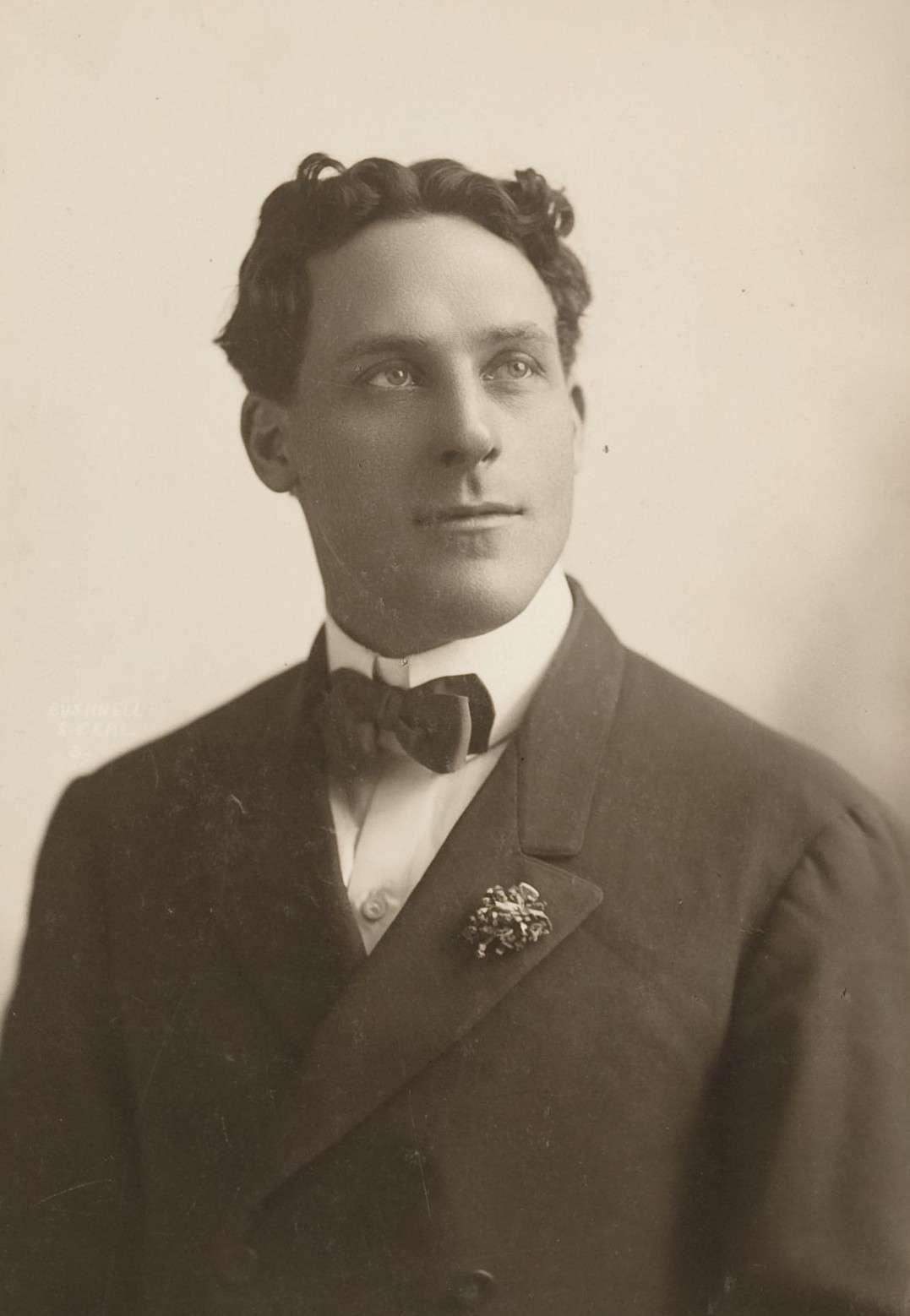
- Born: Charles R. Bowers; June 6, 1887; Cresco, Iowa, U.S.
- Died: 24 November 1946 (aged 59); Paterson, New Jersey, U.S.

Charles R. Bowers (June 6, 1887 – November 24, 1946) was an American cartoonist and film director during the silent film and early "talkie" era. He was forgotten for decades and his name was notably absent from most histories of the Silent Era, although his work was enthusiastically reviewed by André Breton and a number of his contemporaries. As his surviving films have an inventiveness and surrealism which give them a freshness appealing to modern audiences, after his rediscovery his work has sometimes been placed in the "top tier" of silent film accomplishments (along with those of, for example, Charlie Chaplin, Buster Keaton, Harold Lloyd). In comic style, he probably modelled himself after both Harry Langdon and Buster Keaton and was known to the French as "Bricolo."

== Biography ==
It's a Bird (1930), a comedy film with animation and live action

The son of Dr. Charles E. Bowers and his wife, Mary I. Bowers, Charles Raymond Bowers was born in Cresco, Iowa. His early career was as a cartoonist on the Mutt and Jeff series of cartoons for the Barré Studio. By the late 1920s, he was starring in his own series of slapstick comedies for R-C Pictures and Educational Pictures. His slapstick comedies, a few of which have survived, are an amazing mixture of live action and animation created with the "Bowers Process". Complex Rube Goldberg gadgets also appear in many of his comedies. Two notable films include Now You Tell One with a memorable scene of elephants marching into the U.S. Capitol, and There It Is, a surreal mystery involving the Fuzz-Faced Phantom and MacGregor, a housefly detective. He made a few sound films such as It's a Bird and Wild Oysters, and wrote and illustrated children's books in his later years. For eight years during the 1930s he lived in Wayne, New Jersey, and drew cartoons for the Jersey Journal. Bowers also worked for Walter Lantz Productions for a short period. After he succumbed to severe arthritis his wife started drawing them under his direction.

Following a long illness, Bowers died in 1946 in Paterson, New Jersey.

== Filmography ==
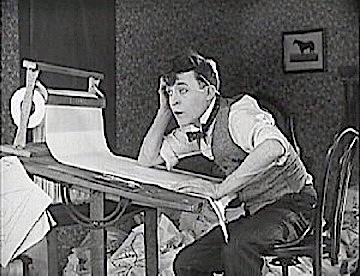
Charley Bowers

His work, long forgotten, has undergone a rediscovery and revival of interest in recent years. His 15 surviving films were the subject of a 2004 two-DVD release by Image Entertainment and Lobster Films of France. Much more of his work is thought to exist in various film archives. In July 2019, Flicker Alley released a Blu-ray set of 17 of his films called "The Extraordinary World of Charley Bowers."

- The Extra Quick Lunch 1917, 5’34, Animation - Mutt and Jeff
- A.W.O.L. 1918, 5’22, Animation
- Egged On 1926, 24’08, Slapstick
- He Done His Best 1926, 23’42, Slapstick
- A Wild Roomer 1926, 24’27, Slapstick
- Fatal Footstep 1926, 22’18, Slapstick
- Now You Tell One 1926, 22’18, Slapstick
- Many A Slip 1927, 11’36 (Incomplete), Slapstick
- Nothing Doing 1927, 21’17, Slapstick
- There It Is 1928, 17’22, Slapstick
- Say Ah-h! 1928, 14’02 (Incomplete), Slapstick
- It's A Bird 1930, 14’10, Slapstick
- Believe It Or Don’t Ca 1935, 7’53, stop-motion Animation
- Pete Roleum And His Cousins 1939, 15’41, stop-motion Animation
- Wild Oysters 1940, 10’06, stop-motion Animation - Released by Paramount Pictures as a Max Fleischer Animated Antic
- A Sleepless Night Ca 1940, 10’59, stop-motion Animation

== Bibliography ==
- Banc-Titre (March 1978). pp. 10–11. Article on Bowers's films, with short biography. (in French)
- Funnyworld (October 1978). pp. 35–36. Memories of Bowers, by animator Dick Huemer.
- Midi-Minuit Fantastique (June 1967). pp. 62–65, Article on Bowers's films and career. (in French)
