= List of years in animation =

This article lists some notable events in animation, from 1854 to the present day.

== 1850s ==
- 1854 – In London, the Welsh photographer John Dillwyn Llewelyn exhibited several early instantaneous photographs of the seaside. In 1855, he demonstrated these photographs at the Exposition Universelle in Paris. His works were well received by critics, with detailed analysis of how well the waves were pictured. Llewelyn probably was an early adopter of the use of an automatic shutter, though the start date for this practice is uncertain.
- 1855 – In 1855, the Austrian-German physiologist Johann Nepomuk Czermak published an article about his Stereophoroskop and other experiments aimed at stereoscopic moving images. He mentioned a method of sticking needles in a stroboscopic disc so that it looked like one needle was being pushed in and out of the cardboard when animated. He realized that this method provided basically endless possibilities to make different 3D animations. He then introduced two methods to animate stereoscopic pairs of images, one was basically a stereo viewer using two stroboscopic discs and the other was more or less similar to the later zoetrope. Czermak explained how suitable stereoscopic photographs could be made by recording a series of models, for instance to animate a growing pyramid.
- 1856 – Publication of Majama’ al-Bahrayn (1856) by al-Yaziji. It is a modern example of the maqama genre of picaresque short stories. The illustrations of the genre tend to share formal qualities with the art of shadow play. Shadow plays are considered a precursor to silhouette animation.
- 1857 – In 1857, the earliest known illustration of a vertical biunial magic lantern, probably provided by E.G. Wood, appeared in the Horne & Thornthwaite catalogue. Biunial lanterns, with two projecting optical sets in one apparatus, were produced to more easily project dissolving views.
- 1858 – In 1858, the physicist Joseph-Charles d'Almeida published descriptions of two methods that he had successfully developed to project stereoscopic images. The first was an anaglyph method with red and green glasses, the second used the stroboscopic principle to alternately present each picture to the corresponding eye in quick succession. D'Almeida had started work on combining this method with the principles of the phenakistiscope.
- 1859 – On April 7, 1859, the Belgian civil engineer and inventor Henri Désiré du Mont filed a Belgian patent for nine different versions of his Omniscope, of which most would show stereoscopic animation from stroboscopic discs or from cylinders with pictures on the outside. One version was built inside a peep-box and had a lens focusing a light-beam to project the image on a frosted glass screen. Another design combined two zoetropes with Charles Wheatstone's reflecting stereoscope in between.

== 1860s ==
- 1860 – On 27 February 1860, Peter Hubert Desvignes received British patent no. 537 for 28 monocular and stereoscopic variations of cylindrical stroboscopic devices, much like the later zoetrope. His devices included a version that used an endless band of pictures running between two spools which was intermittently lit by an electric spark. Desvignes' Mimoscope later received an honourable mention "for ingenuity of construction" at the 1862 International Exhibition in London. It could "exhibit drawings, models, single or stereoscopic photographs, so as to animate animal movements, or that of machinery, showing various other illusions."
- 1861 – In 1861, the American engineer Coleman Sellers II received US patent No. 35,317 for the kinematoscope, a device that exhibited "stereoscopic pictures as to make them represent objects in motion". In his application he stated: "This has frequently been done with plane pictures but has never been, with stereoscopic pictures". He used three sets of stereoscopic photographs in a sequence with some duplicates to regulate the flow of a simple repetitive motion, but also described a system for very large series of pictures of complicated motion.
- 1862 – The English inventor Peter Hubert Desvignes received an Honourable Mention "for ingenuity of construction" at the 1862 International Exhibition in London for his Mimoscope. He had created several monocular and stereoscopic variations of cylindrical stroboscopic devices, much like the later zoetrope. His device could "exhibit drawings, models, single or stereoscopic photographs, so as to animate animal movements, or that of machinery, showing various other illusions." Desvignes "employed models, insects and other objects, instead of pictures, with perfect success." The horizontal slits allowed a much improved view, with both eyes, of the opposite pictures.
- 1863 – On 1 January 1863, The Illustrated London News reported on a magic lantern production of Cinderella at the Royal Polytechnic Institution, in which the showman Henry Langdon Childe was involved in painting slides, following the designs of Henry George Hine.
- 1864 – According to the 1864 narrative of the British mathematician Charles Babbage, the thaumatrope was invented by the Irish geologist William Henry Fitton. Babbage had told Fitton how the astronomer John Herschel had challenged him to show both sides of a shilling at once. Babbage held the coin in front of a mirror, but Herschel showed how both sides were visible when the coin was spun on the table. A few days later Fitton brought Babbage a new illustration of the principle, consisting of a round disc of card suspended between two pieces of sewing silk. This disc had a parrot on one side and a cage at the other side. Babbage and Fitton made several different designs and amused some friends with them for a short while. They forgot about it until some months later they heard about the supposed invention of the thaumatrope by John Ayrton Paris.
- 1865 – Edmund Johann Krüss, representing the optical equipment company Krüss Optronic, received a patent for his version of the magic lantern. The device was a forerunner of movie projectors.
- 1866 – The inventor William Ensign Lincoln applied for a U.S. patent for his zoetrope, as an assignor to the board game manufacturing company Milton Bradley and Co.. The patent was granted to him in April 1867. Lincoln had invented the definitive version of the zoetrope in 1865, when he was about 18 years old and a sophomore at the Brown University in Providence, Rhode Island. Lincoln's patented version had the viewing slits on a level above the pictures, which allowed the use of easily replaceable strips of images. It also had an illustrated paper disc on the base, which was not always exploited on the commercially produced versions. On the advice of a local bookstore owner, Lincoln had sent a model to Milton Bradley and Co. in an attempt to market the animation device.
- 1867 – The inventor William Ensign Lincoln is granted a U.S. patent for his zoetrope, as an assignor to the board game manufacturing company Milton Bradley and Co.. This animation device was also patented in the United Kingdom of Great Britain and Ireland on June 7, 1867 (application March 6, 1867) under no. 629, by Henry Watson Hallett (as a communication to him by Milton Bradley), and in the Second French Empire by Charles William May (filed May 14, 1867).
- 1868 – The physicist James Clerk Maxwell had an improved zoetrope constructed. Instead of slits, his version used concave lenses with a focal length equaling the diameter of the cylinder. The virtual image was thus seen in the centre and appeared much more sharp and steady than in the original zoetrope. Maxwell drew several strips that mostly demonstrated subjects relating to physics, like the vibrations of a harp string or Helmholtz's vortex rings threading through each other. An article about the "Zootrope perfectionné" was published in the French science magazine Le Cosmos in 1869, but Maxwell never marketed his animation device.
- 1869 – Thomas Ross developed a small and transparent phenakistiscope system, called Wheel of life, which fitted inside a standard magic lantern slide. A first version, patented in 1869, had a glass disc with eight phases of a movement and a counter-rotating glass shutter disc with eight apertures. The discs depicted ice skaters, fishes, a giant's ladder, a bottle imp, and other subjects. Ross introduced an improved version of his animation device in 1871.

== 1870s ==
- 1870 – The Philadelphia-based engineer Henry Renno Heyl presented his Phasmatrope to 1500 persons at a church entertainment evening at the Philadelphia Academy of Music. This modified magic lantern had a wheel that could hold 16 photographic slides and a shutter. The wheel was rotated in front of the light source by an intermittent mechanism to project the slides successively, probably with a speed of 3 fps. The program contained three subjects: All Right (a popular Japanese acrobat), Brother Jonathan, and a waltzing couple. Brother Jonathan addressed the audience with a voice actor behind the screen and professed that "this art will rapidly develop into one of the greatest merit for instruction and enjoyment." The pictures of the waltzing couple survived and consist of four shots of costumed dancers (Heyl and a female dancing partner) that were repeated four times in the wheel. The pictures were posed. The waltzing animations were screened with an appropriate musical accompaniment by a 40-person orchestra. Heyl's only known other show was a screening on 16 March 1870 at the Franklin Institute.
- 1871 – During the Siege of Paris (1870–1871) by the Prussian Army, the inventor René Dagron proposed to the French authorities to use his microfilming process to carry the messages by carrier pigeons across German lines. Dagron photographed pages of newspapers in their entirety which he then converted into miniature photographs. He subsequently removed the collodion film from the glass base and rolled it tightly into a cylindrical shape which he then inserted into miniature tubes that were transported fastened to the tail feathers of the pigeons. Upon receipt the microphotograph was reattached to a glass frame and was then projected by magic lantern on the wall. The message contained in the microfilm could then be transcribed or copied. By 28 January 1871, when Paris and the Government of National Defense surrendered, Dagron had delivered 115,000 messages to Paris by carrier pigeon.
- 1872 – In 1872, Leland Stanford, a businessman, race-horse owner, and former governor of California hired the photographer Eadweard Muybridge for a portfolio depicting his mansion and other possessions, including his race-horse Occident. Stanford also wanted a proper picture of the horse at full speed. He was frustrated that the existing depictions and descriptions seemed incorrect. The human eye could not fully break down the action at the quick gaits of the trot and gallop. Up until this time, most artists painted horses at a trot with one foot always on the ground; and at a full gallop with the front legs extended forward and the hind legs extended to the rear, and all feet off the ground. There are stories that Stanford had made a $25,000 bet on his theories about horse locomotion, but no evidence has been found of such a wager. However, it has been estimated that Stanford spent a total of $50,000 over the next several years to fund his investigations on animal locomotion. Stanford would initially fund Muybridge's experiments with chronophotography, an important step in the development of motion pictures.
- 1873 – The pioneer animator Charles-Émile Reynaud starts holding free magic lantern shows in the style of François-Napoléon-Marie Moigno. Reynaud had previously worked as an assistant of Moigno.
- 1874 – In 1874, Jules Janssen made several practice discs for the recording of the passage of Venus with his series Passage de Vénus, which he intended to record with his photographic revolver. He used a model of the planet and a light source standing in for the Sun. While actual recordings of the passage of Venus have not been located, some practice discs survived and the images of one were turned into a short animated film after the development of cinematography. The images were purportedly taken in Japan by Janssen himself and the Brazilian engineer Francisco Antônio de Almeida by using Janssen's photographic revolver. The revolver could take several dozens of exposures at regulated intervals on a daguerreotype disc. The Janssen revolver was the instrument that originated chronophotography, a branch of photography based on capturing movement from a sequence of images. To create the apparatus Pierre Janssen was inspired by the revolving cylinder of Samuel Colt's revolver.
- 1875 – the physiologist Sigmund Exner showed that, under the right conditions, people will see two quick, spatially separated but stationary electrical sparks as a single light moving from place to place, while quicker flashes were interpreted as motion between two stationary lights. Exner argued that the impression of the moving light was a perception (from a mental process) of the motion between the stationary lights as pure sense. This is an explanation of the optical illusion of illusory motion known as the beta movement. The illusion of motion caused by animation and film is sometimes believed to rely on beta movement, as an alternative to the older explanation known as persistence of vision.
- 1876 – The popular science magazine La Nature publishes a series of articles about optical illusion devices. The articles inspire the magic lantern performer Charles-Émile Reynaud to start developing his own animation device, the praxinoscope. He received a patent for his device in 1877.
- 1877 – Charles-Émile Reynaud patented the praxinoscope, an animation device that improved on the zoetrope. Like the zoetrope, the praxinoscope used a strip of pictures placed around the inner surface of a spinning cylinder. The praxinoscope improved on the zoetrope by replacing its narrow viewing slits with an inner circle of mirrors that intermittently reflected the images. The praxinoscope allowed a much clearer view of the moving image compared to the zoetrope, since the zoetrope's images were actually mostly obscured by the spaces in between its slits. Reynaud mentioned the possibility of projecting the images in his 1877 patent, but did not complete his praxinoscope projection device until 1880.
- 1878 – Charles-Émile Reynaud received an honourable mention at the 1878 Exposition Universelle for his praxinoscope. He started production on the device and was able to quit his teaching job after its financial success. The device was initially offered at Le Bon Marché stores.
- 1879 – Charles-Émile Reynaud registered a modification to the praxinoscope patent to include the Praxinoscope Théâtre, which utilized the Pepper's ghost effect to present the animated figures in an exchangeable background. Later improvements included the "Praxinoscope à projection" (marketed since 1882) which used a double magic lantern to project the animated figures over a still projection of a background.

== 1880s ==
- 1880 – The Zoopraxiscope of Eadweard Muybridge was introduced in 1880 at the California School of Fine Arts. Muybridge did project moving images from his photographs with his Zoopraxiscope, from 1880 to 1895, but these were painted on discs and his technique was no more advanced than similar earlier demonstrations (for instance those by Franz von Uchatius in 1853). The first discs were painted on the glass in dark contours. Discs made between 1892 and 1894 had outlines drawn by Erwin Faber photographically printed on the disc and then colored by hand, but these discs were probably never used in Muybridge's lectures.
- 1881 – Eadweard Muybridge first visited Étienne-Jules Marey's studio in France and viewed stop-motion studies before returning to the United States to further his own work in the same area. The Chronophotography of Muybridge and Marey was a predecessor to cinematography and the moving film. It also had a profound influence on the beginnings of Cubism and Futurism. Chronophotography involved a series or succession of different images, originally created and used for the scientific study of movement.
- 1882 – Eadweard Muybridge lectured at the Royal Institution in London in front of a sell-out audience, which included members of the Royal Family, notably the future king Edward VII. He displayed his photographs on screen and showed moving pictures projected by his zoopraxiscope.
- 1883 – Eadweard Muybridge met with William Pepper and J.B. Lippincott to discuss a plan for a scientific study focused on the analysis of animal and human movement. The university contributed $5,000, seeing the proposed project as important research that would benefit anthropology, physiology, medicine, and sports. The project was based on Muybridge's work with the zoopraxiscope, and would result in the production of Animal Locomotion (1887).
- 1884 – Opening of the amusement center Eden Musée in New York City. It featured a changing selection of specialty entertainment, including magic lantern shows and marionettes. The magic lantern was not only a direct ancestor of the motion picture projector as a means for visual storytelling, but it could itself be used to project moving images. Some suggestion of movement could be achieved by alternating between pictures of different phases of a motion, but most magic lantern "animations" used two glass slides projected together — one with the stationary part of the picture and the other with the part that could be set in motion by hand or by a simple mechanism.
- 1885 – From spring 1884 to Autumn 1885, Eadweard Muybridge and his team produced over 100,000 images, mostly at an outdoor studio on the grounds of the University of Pennsylvania's northeast corner of 36th and Pine, recording the motions of animals from the veterinary hospital, and from humans: University professors, students, athletes, Blockley Almshouse patients, and local residents. Thomas Eakins worked with him briefly, although the painter preferred working with multiple exposures on a single negative, whereas Muybridge preferred capturing motion through the use of multiple cameras. Since 1879, Muybridge was working on the zoöpraxiscope (animal action viewer), a projection device that created cyclical animations of animal movement, incorporating technologies from photography, the magic lantern and the zoetrope. The photographer created painted sequences on the glass zoöpraxiscope discs that were based on his motion-study photographs to produce an early form of animation. Muybridge used these to illustrate his lectures that were presented to audiences in the U.S. and Europe, marking his contribution to photography and film in relation to the "experience of time within modernity."
- 1886 – Henri Rivière created a form of shadow theatre at the Chat Noir under the name "ombres chinoises". This was a notable success, lasting for a decade until the cafe closed in 1897. He used back-lit zinc cut-out figures which appeared as silhouettes. Rivière was soon joined by Caran d'Ache and other artists, initially performing d'Ache's drama L’Epopee. From 1886 to 1896, Rivière created 43 shadow plays on a great variety of subjects from myth, history and the Bible. He collaborated with many different artists and writers, but made the illustrations for only 9 of the productions himself. He concentrated on improving the technical aspects of the production by using enamelling and lighting to create extremely delicate effects of light and colour. The Ombres evolved into numerous theatrical productions and had a major influence on phantasmagoria. The technique is considered a precursor to silhouette animation.
- 1887 – Publication of Animal Locomotion, a chronophotographic series by Eadweard Muybridge. It comprised 781 collotype plates, each containing up to 36 pictures of the different phases of a specific motion of one subject (over 20,000 images in total). The series is a result of Muybridge's interest in motion studies and his work on the zoopraxiscope. Historians and theoreticians have proposed that Muybridge's work on animal locomotion influenced a number of other artists, photographers and filmmakers, including Marcel Duchamp, Thomas Eakins, Walt Disney, among others.
- 1888 – On December 1, Charles-Émile Reynaud files a patent for his animated moving picture system Théâtre Optique. The patent was issued on 14 January 1889. Reynaud in the 1888 patent: "The aim of the apparatus is to obtain the illusion of motion, which is no longer limited to the repetition of the same poses at each turn of the instrument, as is necessary in all known apparatus (Zootropes, Praxinoscopes, etc.), but Having, on the contrary, an indefinite variety and duration, and thus producing real scenes animated by unlimited development. Hence the name of Optical Theater given by the inventor to this apparatus" (translated from French).
- 1889 – On January 14, Charles-Émile Reynaud receives a French patent for his animated moving picture system Théâtre Optique. He also received a British patent for the system on February 8. The system was displayed at the world's fair Exposition Universelle (May–October, 1889) in Paris.

== 1890s ==
- 1890 – Charles-Émile Reynaud creates the film Le Clown et ses chiens (The Clown and His Dogs) for his Théâtre Optique. It would not be exhibited to an audience until 1892.
- 1891 – Charles-Émile Reynaud creates the film Pauvre Pierrot (Poor Pete). The film consists of 500 individually painted images, and originally lasted for about 15 minutes. It would not be exhibited to an audience until 1892.
- 1892 – Charles-Émile Reynaud signed a contract with the Musée Grévin, allowing him to start regular public screenings of his films at the museum. The first public screening took place on October 28. Reynaud received 500 francs (equivalent to €2,400 in 2025) per month and 10% of the box office. The contract disadvantaged Reynaud, as he paid for the maintenance of the system and was required to oversee all of the daily showings.
- 1893 – Eadweard Muybridge produced a series of 50 different paper 'Zoopraxiscope discs' (basically a version of the phenakistiscopes), with pictures drawn by Erwin F. Faber. The discs were intended for sale at the 1893 World's Columbian Exposition in Chicago. They seem to have sold very poorly, and surviving discs are quite rare. The discs were printed in black-and-white, with twelve different discs also produced as chromolithographed versions. Of the coloured versions, only four different ones are known to still exist (with a total of five or six extant copies).
- 1894 – Autour d'une cabine (Around A Cabin), directed by Émile Reynaud. It is an animated film made of 636 individual images hand painted in 1893.The film showed off Reynaud's invention, the Théâtre Optique. It was shown at the Musée Grévin from December 1894 until March 1900.
- 1895 – Release of the film The Execution of Mary Stuart, directed by Alfred Clark. It is the first known film to use special effects, specifically the stop trick. Stop motion is closely related to the stop trick, in which the camera is temporarily stopped during the recording of a scene to create a change before filming is continued (or for which the cause of the change is edited out of the film). In the resulting film, the change will be sudden and a logical cause of the change will be mysteriously absent or replaced with a fake cause that is suggested in the scene. The technique of stop motion can be interpreted as repeatedly applying the stop trick.
- 1896 – Auguste Berthier published an article about the history of stereoscopic images in French scientific magazine Le Cosmos, which included his method of creating an autostereogram.
- 1897 – The Captain and the Kids is created by Rudolph Dirks and debuted December 12, 1897. William Harbutt developed plasticine in 1897. To promote his educational "Plastic Method" he made a handbook that included several photographs that displayed various stages of creative projects. The images suggest phases of motion or change, but the book probably did not have a direct influence on claymation films. Still, the plasticine product would become the favourite product for clay animators, as it did not dry and harden (unlike normal clay) and was much more malleable than its harder and greasier Italian predecessor plasteline.
- 1898 – The German toy manufacturer Gebrüder Bing introduced their toy "kinematograph", at a toy convention in Leipzig . Other companies soon start production of toy cinematographs and production of cheaper films by printing lithographed drawings. These animations were probably made in black-and-white. The pictures were often traced from live-action films (much like the later rotoscoping technique).
- 1899 – French trick film pioneer Georges Méliès claimed to have invented the stop trick and popularized it by using it in many of his short films. He reportedly used stop-motion animation in 1899 to produce moving letterforms.

== 1900s ==
- 1900 – J. Stuart Blackton and Thomas Edison create The Enchanted Drawing, the first film to feature groundbreaking animated sequences.
- 1901 – Dolly’s Toys. British trick film, directed by Arthur Melbourne-Cooper. It may have used stop-motion animation, or a variant of the stop-action technique previously used by Walter R. Booth.
- 1902 – Fun in a Bakery Shop. Edwin S. Porter used stop-motion animation to depict clay loaves being sculpted into faces. The film's plot was only the pretext of showcasing the skills of a fast sculptor.
- 1903 – The inventor Frederic Eugene Ives receives U.S. patent 725,567 for his "parallax stereogram", the first "no glasses" autostereoscopic 3-D display technology. It helps introduce the animation technique of barrier-grid animation and stereography. Ives' method is then modífied by Eugène Estanave to introduce a method of animated stereoscopic photography.
- 1904 – The Enchanted Toymaker (United Kingdom), combined live-action and stop-motion animation.
- 1905 – How Jones Lost His Roll, the first example of stop-motion animation in American film.; The Whole Dam Family and the Dam Dog, early example of cutout animation
- 1906 – Humorous Phases of Funny Faces, The House of Ghosts
- 1907 – Katsudō Shashin, the oldest known work of animation from Japan.
- 1908 – Fantasmagorie, considered by animation historians as the world's first cartoon, is released.
- 1909 – To Demonstrate How Spiders Fly

== 1910s ==
- 1910 – The Clown and His Donkey
- 1911 – Little Nemo
- 1912 – How a Mosquito Operates
- 1913 – Colonel Heeza Liar
- 1914 – Gertie the Dinosaur, The Police Dog
- 1915 – Farmer Al Falfa, Bobby Bumps
- 1916 – Mutt and Jeff, Krazy Kat
- 1917 – El Apóstol (the first full-length animated feature film)
- 1918 – The Sinking of the Lusitania, Judge Rummy, Out of the Inkwell
- 1919 – Felix the Cat

== 1920s ==
- 1920 – The Van Beuren Corporation is founded.
- 1921 – Inkwekll Studios is founded.
- 1922 – The Mad Locomotive
- 1923 – Alice Comedies, Walt Disney Animation Studios is founded.
- 1924 – Dinky Doodle
- 1925 – Opus IV, Pete
- 1926 – The Adventures of Prince Achmed
- 1927 – First appearance of Oswald the Lucky Rabbit in Trolley Troubles. He appears in Poor Papa, which is made earlier in 1927, but it is rejected by Universal Pictures and not released until 1928.
- 1928 – Mickey Mouse and Minnie Mouse appeared earlier in Plane Crazy but did make their official debuts in Steamboat Willie, the first ever synchronized cartoon with sound.
- 1929 – Silly Symphonies, Talkartoons, Bosko, Terrytoons is founded, Inkwell Studios is reorganized as Fleischer Studios

== 1930s ==
- 1930 – Looney Tunes, Betty Boop, The Chain Gang (first appearance of Pluto)
- 1931 – Merrie Melodies, Scrappy, Toby the Pup, Flip the Frog
- 1932 – Flowers and Trees (the first Silly Symphony cartoon in colour and winner of the first Academy Award for Best Animated Short Film), Goofy, Puppetoons, Warner Bros. Cartoons is founded.
- 1933 – Popeye the Sailor, Three Little Pigs, Fanny Zilch, Father Noah's Ark
- 1934 – Donald Duck, Color Classics, Color Rhapsody, Cri-Cri
- 1935 – Puddy the Pup, Porky Pig, Molly Moo-Cow, The Cookie Carnival
- 1936 – Three Blind Mouseketeers, Kiko the Kangaroo, Moving Day
- 1937 – Daffy Duck, Snow White and the Seven Dwarfs (the first American full-length animated feature film), Metro-Goldwyn-Mayer cartoon studio is founded.
- 1938 – Gandy Goose, Ferdinand the Bull, Bugs Bunny (unofficial first appearance on Porky's Hare Hunt)
- 1939 – the golden key Ugly Duckling, Barney Bear, Andy Panda, Dinky Duck, Gulliver's Travels; National Film Board of Canada is founded.

== 1940s ==
- 1940 – Tom and Jerry, Woody Woodpecker, Pinocchio, Fantasia, Bugs Bunny (first official appearance on A Wild Hare), Daisy Duck, Elmer Fudd, Halas and Batchelor is founded
- 1941 – Raggedy Ann and Andy, Dumbo, Superman, Princess Iron Fan, Mr. Bug Goes to Town, The Reluctant Dragon, The Fox and the Crow, UPA is founded
- 1942 – Bambi, Mighty Mouse, Saludos Amigos, How to Play Baseball, Mickey's Birthday Party, Tweety, Famous Studios is founded
- 1943 – Droopy, Red Hot Riding Hood, Little Lulu, Victory Through Air Power, Chip 'n' Dale, Kumo to Tulip, Chicken Little
- 1944 – The Three Caballeros, Screwy Squirrel, Snowman in July
- 1945 – Casper the Friendly Ghost, Pepé Le Pew, Sylvester the Cat, Yosemite Sam
- 1946 – Make Mine Music, Song of the South, George and Junior, Heckle and Jeckle, Bubble and Squeek, Foghorn Leghorn and Barnyard Dawg; The Tinderbox
- 1947 – Buzzy the Crow, Fun and Fancy Free, Slap Happy Lion, The Crab with the Golden Claws, Tubby the Tuba, The Humpbacked Horse, The Czech Year, Little Audrey
- 1948 – Melody Time, Little Tinker, Rudolph the Red-Nosed Reindeer, Animaland, Happy Holidays, Marvin the Martian, Jay Ward Productions is founded.
- 1949 – The Adventures of Pow Wow, The Dynamite Brothers, Wile E. Coyote and the Road Runner, Mr. Magoo, The Adventures of Ichabod and Mr. Toad

== 1950s ==
- 1950 – Baby Huey, Cinderella, Gerald McBoing-Boing, Herman and Katnip, The Adventures of Paddy the Pelican, Johnny the Giant Killer, The Harveytoons Show, Crusader Rabbit (the first ever animated television series)
- 1951 – Terry Bears, Alice in Wonderland
- 1952 – Tony the Tiger (from Kellogg's Frosted Flakes), The Scarlet Flower, The Snow Maiden, Duck and Cover, Lambert the Sheepish Lion, The Curious Adventures of Mr. Wonderbird, Susie the Little Blue Coupe, The Little House, Magical Maestro, Neighbours
- 1953 – Peter Pan, Chilly Willy, Toot, Whistle, Plunk and Boom, Melody, Speedy Gonzales
- 1954 – Animal Farm, Tasmanian Devil
- 1955 – Lady and the Tramp (becoming the first animated film to be filmed in CinemaScope), The Mickey Mouse Club animated segments, Mighty Mouse Playhouse, Michigan J. Frog
- 1956 – The Gumby Show, The Twelve Months; Toei Animation is founded.
- 1957 – Let's All Go to the Lobby, The Snow Queen, Hergé's Adventures of Tintin; Hanna-Barbera is founded, followed by the first broadcast of its first show, The Ruff and Reddy Show, The Woody Woodpecker Show
- 1958 – The Huckleberry Hound Show, The White Snake Enchantress, Paul Bunyan, The Fabulous World of Jules Verne, Bozo: The World's Most Famous Clown
- 1959 – Matty's Funday Funnies, The Adventures of Rocky and Bullwinkle and Friends, Sleeping Beauty, 1001 Arabian Nights, Hector Heathcote, Hashimoto-san, The Quick Draw McGraw Show, Loopy de Loop, Noggin the Nog, Ivor the Engine, Sandmannchen

== 1960s ==
- 1960 – The Flintstones, The Bugs Bunny Show, Goliath II, Deputy Dawg, King Leonardo and His Short Subjects, Inspector Willoughby, Courageous Cat and Minute Mouse, Popeye the Sailor, Mr. Rossi, The Seal of Neptune, Mister Magoo, Rankin/Bass Animated Entertainment is founded, the first Annecy International Animation Film Festival is held.
- 1961 – The Dick Tracy Show, Calvin and the Colonel, One Hundred and One Dalmatians, The Alvin Show, The Dudley Do-Right Show, Top Cat, Surogat, Tales of the Wizard of Oz, The Yogi Bear Show, The New Adventures of Pinocchio, Pingwings
- 1962 – Beany and Cecil, The Jetsons, Gay Purr-ee, The Hanna-Barbera New Cartoon Series (Wally Gator, Touché Turtle and Dum Dum and Lippy the Lion and Hardy Har Har), The Beary Family, Mister Magoo's Christmas Carol, Filmation, Tatsunoko Productions and MGM Animation/Visual Arts are founded
- 1963 – Tennessee Tuxedo and His Tales, Astro Boy (the first ever anime television series), The Sword in the Stone, The New Casper Cartoon Show, Toucan Sam (from Froot Loops), Calimero, Gigantor; DePatie–Freleng Enterprises is founded
- 1964 – Linus the Lionhearted, Mary Poppins, The Pink Panther, Mafalda, Hoppity Hooper, Jonny Quest, Underdog, Peter Potamus, The Magilla Gorilla Show, Rudolph the Red-Nosed Reindeer (1964), The Porky Pig Show, The Famous Adventures of Mr. Magoo, Grisù, Return to Oz
- 1965 – A Charlie Brown Christmas (first Peanuts TV special), Nudnik, The Magic Roundabout, The Atom Ant/Secret Squirrel Show, The New 3 Stooges, The Dot and the Line, The Astronut Show, Roger Ramjet, Milton the Monster, Sinbad Jr. and His Magic Belt, The Inspector, Kimba the White Lion, Pogles' Wood, West and Soda
- 1966 – Winnie the Pooh featurettes, Space Ghost, Trumptonshire trilogy, Ultra Series, It's the Great Pumpkin, Charlie Brown, How the Grinch Stole Christmas!, Arthur! and the Square Knights of the Round Table, Batfink, The Space Kidettes, Frankenstein Jr. and The Impossibles, The Marvel Super Heroes, The Road Runner Show, Space Ghost (TV series) , The Impossibles, The New Adventures of Superman, A Herb Alpert and the Tijuana Brass Double Feature, Rocket Robin Hood, Leo the Lion, The Adventures of Superboy, The King Kong Show, The Lone Ranger, The Super 6, Bamse
- 1967 – Birdman and the Galaxy Trio, The Jungle Book, Asterix the Gaul, Shazzan, George of the Jungle, Speed Racer, Spider-Man, The Bear That Wasn't, The Herculoids, Jack and the Beanstalk, Fantastic Four, Reksio, Cool Cat, Merlin the Magic Mouse, Tom Slick, Super Chicken, The Superman/Aquaman Hour of Adventure, Samson & Goliath, Moby Dick and Mighty Mightor, Off to See the Wizard, Gokū no Daibōken, Aquaman, Super President, The Cricket on the Hearth
- 1968 – Yellow Submarine, Wacky Races, The Herbs, The Archie Show, The Little Drummer Boy, Shonen Jump is published for the first time, The Batman/Superman Hour, The Adventures of Batman, The New Adventures of Huckleberry Finn, The Adventures of Gulliver, Arabian Knights, The Three Musketeers, Micro Ventures, Roland and Rattfink, Musti, Fantastic Voyage, The Mouse on the Mayflower
- 1969 – Scooby-Doo, Where Are You!, The Perils of Penelope Pitstop, Dastardly and Muttley in Their Flying Machines, The Wonderful World of Puss 'n Boots, Nu, pogodi!, Clangers, Moomin, Hey, Hey, Hey, It's Fat Albert, Cattanooga Cats, Frosty the Snowman, It's Tough to Be a Bird; The Archies release "Sugar, Sugar", A Boy Named Charlie Brown, Here Comes the Grump, The Pink Panther Show, The Ant and the Aardvark, Tijuana Toads, Hattytown Tales, Dororo, The Smokey Bear Show, The Mézga Family, The Abduction of Balthazar Sponge, Skyhawks, Sesame Street animated segments, Hot Wheels, Sazae-san, Bambi Meets Godzilla

== 1970s ==
- 1970 – The Aristocats, Broom-Hilda, Josie and the Pussycats, The Phantom Tollbooth, Santa Claus Is Comin' to Town, Harlem Globetrotters, Sabrina the Teenage Witch, Groovie Goolies, Where's Huddles?, The Adventures of Parsley, The Reluctant Dragon & Mr. Toad Show, The Tomfoolery Show, Horton Hears a Who!, Doctor Dolittle, Will the Real Jerry Lewis Please Sit Down, The Adventures of Hutch the Honeybee
- 1971 – The Funky Phantom, Help!... It's the Hair Bear Bunch!, Mr Benn, Here Comes Peter Cottontail, Bedknobs and Broomsticks, La Linea, The Cat in the Hat, Archie's TV Funnies, The Pebbles and Bamm-Bamm Show, Jackson 5ive, Lupin the 3rd Part I, Frakk, the Cats' Nightmare; Nelvana is founded
- 1972 – Fritz the Cat (bringing in the age of adult animation), The Amazing Chan and the Chan Clan, Fat Albert and the Cosby Kids, Calimero, The New Scooby-Doo Movies, The Merrie Melodies Show, Sealab 2020, The Roman Holidays, The Flintstone Comedy Hour, Wait Till Your Father Gets Home, Snoopy Come Home, The Blue Racer, New Moomin, The Brady Kids, Festival of Family Classics, The Osmonds, Science Ninja Team Gatchaman, Sam on Boffs' Island, Mazinger Z, Cantinflas Show, Around the World in Eighty Days, The Barkleys, The Houndcats, Przygody kota Filemona, The ABC Saturday Superstar Movie, Tamagon the Counselor, The Adventures of Sir Prancelot, Mahōtsukai Chappy, The Most Important Person, The Wonderful Stories of Professor Kitzel, Loeki de Leeuw, Astroganger, Pinocchio: The Series, Hans Christian Andersen's The Emperor's New Clothes, Aardman is founded; the 1st Annie Awards are awarded.
- 1973 – A Charlie Brown Thanksgiving, Demetan Croaker, The Boy Frog, Piconzé, Doraemon, Schoolhouse Rock!, The Wombles, Heavy Traffic, Star Trek: The Animated Series, Johnny Corncob, Charley Says, Robin Hood, Speed Buggy, Charlotte's Web, Fantastic Planet, Dr. Seuss on the Loose, Super Friends, Super Friends (1973), The Addams Family, Jeannie, Inch High, Private Eye, Goober and the Ghost Chasers, Yogi's Gang, Butch Cassidy, Hoot Kloot, The Wombles, Emergency +4, Mission: Magic!, Lassie's Rescue Rangers, Bailey's Comets, Cutie Honey, The Bear Who Slept Through Christmas
- 1974 – The Year Without a Santa Claus, It's the Easter Beagle, Charlie Brown, Roobarb, Hong Kong Phooey, Bagpuss, Mio Mao, Heidi, Girl of the Alps, Closed Mondays, The U.S. of Archie, Wheelie and the Chopper Bunch, Valley of the Dinosaurs, These Are the Days, Tofffsy, Devlin, The Dogfather, Simon in the Land of Chalk Drawings, The New Adventures of Gilligan, Great Mazinger, Space Battleship Yamato, Getter Robo, New Honeybee Hutch, Urikupen Kyūjotai, Hoshi no Ko Poron, Chapi Chapo, Chargeman Ken!, Majokko Megu-chan, Hurricane Polymar, Partridge Family 2200 A.D., Hoshi no Ko Chobin, Mr. Men, Vicky the Viking, 'Twas the Night Before Christmas,
- 1975 – Maya the Honey Bee, Tubby the Tuba (1975), Great, Hedgehog in the Fog, Hugo the Hippo, Bod, The Great Grape Ape Show, Ivor the Engine, The Hoober-Bloob Highway, The Tom & Jerry Show, The Great Grape Ape Show, Grendizer, Time Bokan, Return to the Planet of the Apes, The Secret Lives of Waldo Kitty, Maxipes Fík, Laura, the Prairie Girl, Uncle Croc's Block, Kum-Kum, The Oddball Couple, Víla Amálka, Reideen the Brave, Fraidy Cat, Gamba no Bouken, Tekkaman: The Space Knight, La Seine no Hoshi, The Adventures of Pepero, Getter Robo G, Charlie's Climbing Tree, Teddy Drop Ear, Dog of Flanders, Steel Jeeg, Don Chuck Monogatari, Ikkyū-san, Arabian Nights: Sinbad's Adventures, Leopold the Cat, The Undersea Adventures of Captain Nemo, The Smurfs and the Magic Flute, The First Christmas: The Story of the First Christmas Snow, Nippon Animation is founded.
- 1976 – Jabberjaw, Dynomutt, Dog Wonder, Chorlton and the Wheelies, The Red and the Blue, Noah and Nelly in... SkylArk, Allegro Non Troppo, The Scooby-Doo Show, The Scooby-Doo/Dynomutt Hour, Monica and Friends, Paddington, Little Lulu and Her Little Friends, Clue Club, The Mumbly Cartoon Show, Tarzan, Lord of the Jungle, Chōdenji Robo Combattler V, Gowappa 5 Gōdam, Paul's Miraculous Adventure, Huckleberry no Bōken, Blocker Gundan 4 Machine Blaster, Magne Robo Gakeen, Groizer X, UFO Warrior Dai Apolon, Manga Fairy Tales of the World, Dino Mech Gaiking, 38 Parrots, Piccolino no Bōken, 3000 Leagues in Search of Mother, Paddington, Pat & Mat, The First Easter Rabbit, Frosty's Winter Wonderland, Rudolph's Shiny New Year, The Little Drummer Boy: Book II, Cosgrove Hall Films is founded.
- 1977 – Laff-A-Lympics, The Many Adventures of Winnie the Pooh, Morph, Wizards, The Rescuers, Baggy Pants and the Nitwits, Captain Caveman and the Teen Angels, The Hobbit, Raggedy Ann & Andy: A Musical Adventure, Dot and the Kangaroo, The Flumps, CB Bears, The Sand Castle, Halloween Is Grinch Night, Ludwig, The New Adventures of Batman, The Batman/Tarzan Adventure Hour, The All-New Super Friends Hour, The Skatebirds, The New Archie and Sabrina Hour, Nobody's Boy: Remi, Scooby's All-Star Laff-A-Lympics, The Killing of an Egg, Fred Flintstone and Friends, Jetter Mars, Lupin the 3rd Part II, Yatterman, I Am the Greatest: The Adventures of Muhammad Ali, Space Sentinels, The Toothbrush Family, Wonder Wheels, Attack on Tomorrow!, Chōgattai Majutsu Robo Ginguiser, Wakusei Robo Danguard Ace, Invincible Super Man Zambot 3, Arrow Emblem: Hawk of the Grand Prix, The Robonic Stooges, What's New, Mr. Magoo?, Nestor, the Long-Eared Christmas Donkey, Pikku Kakkonen, Squirrel and Hedgehog, Dinosaur War Izenborg, Voltes V, ABC Weekend Special, Monarch: The Big Bear of Tallac, Rascal the Raccoon, A kockásfülű nyúl, Jamie and the Magic Torch, The Easter Bunny Is Comin' to Town; Ruby-Spears Productions is founded
- 1978 – Watership Down (first animated feature film to be presented in Dolby Stereo), Future Boy Conan, The Lord of the Rings, Ringing Bell, Galaxy Express 999, Battle of the Planets, Fabulous Funnies, Special Delivery, Fangface, The Small One, The New Fantastic Four, Challenge of the Superfriends, Godzilla, Once Upon a Time... Man, Yogi's Space Race, Galaxy Goof-Ups, The All New Popeye Hour, Treasure Island, The Moomins, Gatchaman II, The Freedom Force, Tarzan and the Super 7, Manta and Moray, Superstretch and Microwoman, Web Woman, Space Battleship Yamato II, Puff the Magic Dragon, The Metric Marvels, Récré A2, Uchū Majin Daikengo, Majokko Tickle, Crazylegs Crane, Buford and the Galloping Ghost, The Adventures of the Little Prince, Dinky Dog, Wattoo Wattoo Super Bird, Jana of the Jungle, Invincible Steel Man Daitarn 3, Tōshō Daimos, Starzinger, The Story of Perrine, Space Pirate Captain Harlock, The Stingiest Man in Town
- 1979 – The New Shmoo, Tale of Tales, Banjo the Woodpile Cat, The Castle of Cagliostro, Anne of Green Gables, What-a-Mess, Rudolph and Frosty's Christmas in July, Nutcracker Fantasy, Mobile Suit Gundam, Spider-Woman, Fred and Barney Meet the Thing, Scooby-Doo and Scrappy-Doo, Doraemon, The World's Greatest SuperFriends, Future Robot Daltanious, Casper and the Angels, King Arthur, Fred and Barney Meet the Shmoo, The New Fred and Barney Show, Every Child, The Perishers, Getting Started, Rolf Harris Cartoon Time, The Plastic Man Comedy/Adventure Show, Plonsters, The New Adventures of Mighty Mouse and Heckle & Jeckle, Gatchaman Fighter, The New Adventures of Flash Gordon, The Super Globetrotters, Rickety Rocket, Mighty Man and Yukk, Zenderman, Emily, Jack Frost, Josephina the Whale, Gordian Warrior, The Ultraman, Space Carrier Blue Noah, Bob a Bobek – králíci z klobouku, Manga Sarutobi Sasuke, Hana no Ko Lunlun, Bannertail: The Story of Gray Squirrel, Doctor Snuggles, Star Blazers

== 1980s ==
- 1980 – The Amazing Adventures of Morph, Dingbat and the Creeps, Richie Rich, Strawberry Shortcake, Heathcliff, Thundarr the Barbarian, Scooby-Doo and Scrappy-Doo, The Tom and Jerry Comedy Show, Super Friends (1980), Astro Boy, Hanna–Barbera's World of Super Adventure, King Arthur: Prince on White Horse, The Richie Rich/Scooby-Doo Show, The Flintstone Comedy Show, Ruy, the Little Cid, The New Adventures of the Lone Ranger, The Tarzan/Lone Ranger Adventure Hour, Drak Pack, The Fonz and the Happy Days Gang, Pontoffel Pock, Where Are You?, Rescueman, Muteking, The Dashing Warrior, Maeterlinck's Blue Bird: Tyltyl and Mytyl's Adventurous Journey, Invincible Robo Trider G7, Aubrey, Space Emperor God Sigma, Space Warrior Baldios, Lalabel, the Magical Girl, Cockleshell Bay, Matinee at the Bijou, King Rollo, The Littl' Bits, Space Battleship Yamato III, The World of Strawberry Shortcake, The New Adventures of Gigantor, Space Runaway Ideon, The Adventures of Tom Sawyer, Hungarian Folk Tales, The Wonderful Adventures of Nils, Sport Billy, Eureka!, Force Five, Warner Bros. Animation is founded.
- 1981 – The Smurfs, Danger Mouse (1981), Postman Pat, American Pop, Heavy Metal, The Fox and the Hound, Willo the Wisp, Honey Honey no Suteki na Bouken, Dogtanian and the Three Muskehounds, Urusei Yatsura, Crac, Spider-Man and His Amazing Friends, Spider-Man, Space Stars, Beast King GoLion, The New Adventures of Zorro, Trollkins, The Kwicky Koala Show, The Kid Super Power Hour with Shazam!, Hero High, GoShogun, Blackstar, Laverne & Shirley, Goldie Gold and Action Jack, J9 Series, Galaxy Cyclone Braiger, Golden Warrior Gold Lightan, Fang of the Sun Dougram, Ninja Hattori-kun, Yattodetaman, God Mars, Little Women, Pigeon Street, Queen Millennia, The Great Space Coaster, Night Flight, Ai no Gakko Cuore Monogatari, Superbook, Manga Mito Kōmon, Hello! Sandybell, Belle and Sebastian, The Swiss Family Robinson: Flone of the Mysterious Island, Ulysses 31, Strawberry Shortcake in Big Apple City, Tango
- 1982 – Pink Floyd - The Wall, The Secret of NIMH, The Snowman, SuperTed, The Last Unicorn, Monica and Friends, Super Dimension Fortress Macross, Pac-Man, The Mysterious Cities of Gold, Tron, The Plague Dogs, Hey Good Lookin', Ziggy's Gift, Les Maîtres du temps, Here Comes Garfield, The Incredible Hulk, Armored Fleet Dairugger XV, Once Upon a Time... Space, Shirt Tales, The Gary Coleman Show, Jokebook, The Scooby & Scrappy-Doo/Puppy Hour, Meatballs & Spaghetti, Pandamonium, Gilligan's Planet, Arcadia of My Youth: Endless Orbit SSX, The Puppy's Further Adventures, Mork & Mindy/Laverne & Shirley/Fonz Hour, The Little Rascals, The Pac-Man/Little Rascals/Richie Rich Show, Galactic Gale Baxingar, Acrobunch, Boy General, Robby the Rascal, Combat Mecha Xabungle, Jane, Murun Buchstansangur, Thunderbirds 2086, Magical Princess Minky Momo, Pinocchio's Christmas, The Flying House, Little Pollon, Lucy-May of the Southern Rainbow, Gyakuten! Ippatsuman, Strawberry Shortcake: Pets on Parade, Curious George, The Return of the King, Amigo and Friends, Klasky Csupo is founded.
- 1983 – He-Man and the Masters of the Universe, G.I. Joe: A Real American Hero, Alvin and the Chipmunks, Golgo 13: The Professional, The Wind in the Willows, Crusher Joe, Inspector Gadget, Henry's Cat, Abra Cadabra, The Biskitts, Rock & Rule (first animated feature film to use computer graphics), Katy, Fire and Ice, Mrs. Pepperpot (TV series), Nanako SOS, Mickey's Christmas Carol, Twice Upon a Time, Chronopolis, Mr. T, Creamy Mami, the Magic Angel, Dallos (first animated production released exclusively on direct-to-video), The New Scooby and Scrappy-Doo Show, Lightspeed Electroid Albegas, Saturday Supercade, Bananaman, The Adventures of Portland Bill, Moschops, Armored Trooper Votoms, The Charlie Brown and Snoopy Show, Dungeons & Dragons, The Dukes, Genesis Climber MOSPEADA, The Littles, Rubik, the Amazing Cube, Monchhichis, The Monchhichis/Little Rascals/Richie Rich Show, Super Dimension Century Orguss, Gran, Braingames, Aura Battler Dunbine, Yakari, Mīmu Iro Iro Yume no Tabi, Mr. Hiccup, Taotao, Fushigi no Kuni no Alice, Serendipity the Pink Dragon, Story of the Alps: My Annette, Reading Rainbow, Galactic Whirlwind Sasuraiger, Itadakiman, Perman, Strawberry Shortcake: Housewarming Surprise, Rocky Hollow
- 1984 – Snorks, The Transformers, The Camel Boy, Nausicaä of the Valley of the Wind, Gallavants, Fist of the North Star, The Adventures of André & Wally B., Voltron, Rainbow Brite, The Family-Ness, Thomas the Tank Engine & Friends, Rupert and the Frog Song, Muppet Babies, Lensman, Challenge of the GoBots, Super Friends: The Legendary Super Powers Show, Lucky Luke, Scary Scooby Funnies, Charade, Around the World with Willy Fog, Pink Panther and Sons, Bismark, Persia, the Magic Fairy, Kidd Video, Pole Position, The Get Along Gang, Super Dimension Cavalry Southern Cross, Tottie: The Story of a Doll's House, Galactic Patrol Lensman, God Mazinger, Elves of the Forest, Heavy Metal L-Gaim, Video Warrior Laserion, Video ranger 007, James the Cat, Adventures of the Little Koala, Noozles, Dragon's Lair, Wolf Rock TV, Turbo Teen, Mighty Orbots, Little Memole, Ferdy the Ant, Lupin the 3rd Part III, Katri, Girl of the Meadows, The Wind in the Willows, Sherlock Hound, The Return of the Prodigal Parrot, Heathcliff, The Catillac Cats, Towser, Strawberry Shortcake and the Baby Without a Name, Disney Television Animation is founded.
- 1985 – Jayce and the Wheeled Warriors, Care Bears, ThunderCats, The Raccoons, Galtar and the Golden Lance, Paw Paws, The Wuzzles, Adventures of the Gummi Bears, M.A.S.K., Jem, The Black Cauldron, Dirty Pair, Mobile Suit Zeta Gundam, The 13 Ghosts of Scooby-Doo, The Super Powers Team: Galactic Guardians, Ewoks, Star Wars: Droids, She-Ra: Princess of Power, The Funtastic World of Hanna-Barbera, Alias the Jester, The Greatest Adventure: Stories from the Bible, Yogi's Treasure Hunt, Scooby's Mystery Funhouse, The Big Snit, The World of David the Gnome, HBTV, Robotix, Bigfoot and the Muscle Machines, Super Sunday, Magical Emi, the Magic Star, It's Punky Brewster, Hulk Hogan's Rock 'n' Wrestling, The Berenstain Bears, Little Muppet Monsters, Dancouga – Super Beast Machine God, Dream Hunter Rem, Fantadroms, Onegai! Samia-don, Sports Cartoons, Bumpety Boo, Ninja Senshi Tobikage, Bertha, Clémentine, Spartakus and the Sun Beneath the Sea, Princess Sara, Robotech, CBS Storybreak, Seabert, Strawberry Shortcake Meets the Berrykins; Studio Ghibli is founded
- 1986 – Foofur, The Great Mouse Detective, My Little Pony, An American Tail, Castle in the Sky, The Transformers: The Movie, The Real Ghostbusters, Footrot Flats: The Dog's Tale, The Raggy Dolls, When the Wind Blows, Pound Puppies, Pingu; Pixar is founded, along with its first short film Luxo Jr., A Greek Tragedy, Transformers: Scramble City, Mobile Suit Gundam ZZ, The New Adventures of Jonny Quest, Voltron: Fleet of Doom, Ghostbusters, Dragon Ball, Muzzy in Gondoland, The Flintstone Kids, Defenders of the Earth, Dennis the Menace, The Blunders, The Wonderful Wizard of Oz, Machine Robo: Revenge of Cronos, SilverHawks, G-Force: Guardians of Space, Inhumanoids, Potato Head Kids, MoonDreamers, The Glo Friends, The Adventures of the Galaxy Rangers, Pastel Yumi, the Magic Idol, Lazer Tag Academy, Kissyfur, The Bluffers, Janoschs Traumstunde, Uchūsen Sagittarius, Bosco Adventure, The Story of Pollyanna, Girl of Love, Popples, Wildfire, Teen Wolf, Galaxy High School, Karate Kommandos, Jimbo and the Jet-Set, Maple Town, The Adventures of Teddy Ruxpin, Rambo: The Force of Freedom, Centurions, The Care Bears Family, Captain Harlock and the Queen of a Thousand Years, Pinny's House, The Storybook Series with Hayley Mills, The Trap Door
- 1987 – Teenage Mutant Ninja Turtles, The Simpsons (animated shorts of The Tracey Ullman Show), My Pet Monster, DuckTales, Fireman Sam, The Adventures of Spot, ALF: The Animated Series, Beverly Hills Teens, Royal Space Force: The Wings of Honnêamise, Once Upon a Time... Life, The Chipmunk Adventure, The Brave Little Toaster, Bubblegum Crisis, Hello Kitty's Furry Tale Theater, The Man Who Planted Trees, Gandahar, Transformers: The Headmasters, Sky Commanders, Lupo the Butcher, The New Archies, The Three Musketeers, Tales of Little Women, Your Face, Edward and Friends, The Shoe People, Hanna-Barbera Superstars 10, TigerSharks, The Comic Strip, Sylvanian Families, Zillion, Dick Spanner, P.I., Twilight Q, Lady Lovely Locks, Starcom: The U.S. Space Force, Spiral Zone, Ovide and the Gang, Popeye and Son, Ox Tales, Grimm's Fairy Tale Classics, Mighty Mouse: The New Adventures, Dinosaucers, Bionic Six, Visionaries: Knights of the Magical Light, Fraggle Rock: The Animated Series, Saber Rider and the Star Sheriffs, BraveStarr, Little Wizards, The Little Clowns of Happytown; Blue Sky Studios is founded.
- 1988 – Who Framed Roger Rabbit, My Neighbor Totoro, Akira, The Land Before Time, Charlie Chalk, Denver, the Last Dinosaur, Count Duckula, Grave of the Fireflies, Tin Toy, Oliver & Company, Kiteretsu Daihyakka, Garfield and Friends, City Hunter, Alice, Technological Threat, Fantastic Max, Topo Gigio, Transformers: Super-God Masterforce, A Pup Named Scooby-Doo, The New Adventures of Winnie the Pooh, RoboCop, The New Yogi Bear Show, The Completely Mental Misadventures of Ed Grimley, Bobobobs, Wowser, Diplodo, The Cat Came Back, The Ratties, Little Lord Fauntleroy, Barney, The New Adventures of Beany and Cecil, The Adventures of Raggedy Ann and Andy, Hello! Lady Lynn, Stoppit and Tidyup, Benjamin the Elephant, Mashin Hero Wataru, Garbage Pail Kids, ALF Tales, This Is America, Charlie Brown, Patlabor, Ronin Warriors, Police Academy, Superman, Dino-Riders, Marvel Action Universe, COPS, Stories of the Sylvanian Families, Dragon Century
- 1989 – The Simpsons (marked the resurgence of adult animation), The Little Mermaid (starting off the Disney Renaissance), The BFG, Chip 'n Dale: Rescue Rangers, Babar, Beetlejuice, Ranma ½, Kiki's Delivery Service, Creature Comforts, All Dogs Go to Heaven, Muzzy Comes Back, Little Nemo: Adventures in Slumberland, The Jungle Book, Alfred J. Kwak, Dink, the Little Dinosaur, Happily Ever After, Knick Knack, The Butter Battle Book, Transformers: Victory, X-Men: Pryde of the X-Men, The Further Adventures of SuperTed, Paddington Bear, Captain N: The Game Master, Dragon Ball Z, The Return of Dogtanian, A Thousand and One... Americas, Huxley Pig, Windfalls, Bangers and Mash, The Super Mario Bros. Super Show!, Bouli, Patlabor: The TV Series, Peter Pan: The Animated Series, G.I. Joe: A Real American Hero, Idol Densetsu Eriko, Ring Raiders, Telekids, Long Ago and Far Away, Blue Blink, The New Adventures of Kimba The White Lion, Madö King Granzört, Spiff and Hercules, Penny Crayon, The California Raisin Show, Rude Dog and the Dweebs, The Poddington Peas, Grim Tales, Los Trotamúsicos, Legend of Heavenly Sphere Shurato, The Karate Kid, McGee and Me!, Camp Candy, The Guyver: Bio-Booster Armor, Rolf's Cartoon Club, The Smoggies, Maxie's World, The Adventures of Hutch the Honeybee, A Grand Day Out, A Tale of Two Toads, Spümcø & GRAFx are founded.

== 1990s ==
- 1990 – Tiny Toon Adventures, The Prince and the Pauper, The Rescuers Down Under, Captain Planet and the Planeteers, TaleSpin, Bobby's World, Transformers: Zone, Tom & Jerry Kids, Merrie Melodies Starring Bugs Bunny & Friends, The New Adventures of He-Man, AD Police Files, Agro's Cartoon Connection, Nellie the Elephant, The Dreamstone, The Adventures of Super Mario Bros. 3, Iczer Reborn, Barnyard Commandos, Saturday Disney, Bill & Ted's Excellent Adventures, Midnight Patrol: Adventures in the Dream Zone, Timeless Tales from Hallmark, Video Power, Project A-ko: Gray Side/Blue Side, The Wizard of Oz, Patlabor: The New Files, The Fruitties, The Little Flying Bears, Sharky & George, Fox's Peter Pan & the Pirates, Robin Hood, Kyatto Ninden Teyandee, My Daddy Long Legs, Nadia: The Secret of Blue Water, Moomin, Swamp Thing, Samurai Pizza Cats, Pingu; Disneytoon Studios is founded.
- 1991 – Beauty and the Beast, Where's Wally?, Rock-a-Doodle, An American Tail: Fievel Goes West, the first three Nicktoons (Doug, Rugrats and The Ren & Stimpy Show), Darkwing Duck, Only Yesterday, Æon Flux, Wish Kid, A Bunch of Munsch, Taz-Mania, Manipulation, Lucky Luke, The Pirates of Dark Water, Young Robin Hood, Bubblegum Crash, Mother Goose and Grimm, Back to the Future, The Legend of Prince Valiant, Yo Yogi!, Liquid Television, The Cobi Troupe, Rod 'n' Emu, Future GPX Cyber Formula, Soupe Opéra, Mischievous Twins: The Tales of St. Clare's, Captain Zed and the Zee Zone, Victor & Hugo: Bunglers in Crime, Spider!, Saban's Adventures of the Little Mermaid, Little Shop, Little Dracula, Anime Himitsu no Hanazono, ProStars, Mr. Bogus, Hammerman, Moero! Top Striker, Trapp Family Story, Toxic Crusaders, The Twins of Destiny, James Bond Jr., Bucky O'Hare and the Toad Wars!, Dragon Quest: The Adventure of Dai, Mobile Suit Gundam 0083: Stardust Memory, Super Mario World, Rupert, The Adventures of Tintin, Blackfly, Getter Robo Go
- 1992 – Aladdin, Batman: The Animated Series, Sailor Moon, The World of Peter Rabbit and Friends, Blinky Bill: The Mischievous Koala, Shakespeare: The Animated Tales, Eek! the Cat, FernGully: The Last Rainforest, X-Men, Crayon Shin-Chan, Porco Rosso, Goof Troop, YuYu Hakusho, The Spirit of Christmas, Noddy's Toyland Adventures, Godzilland, The Little Mermaid, Once Upon a Time... The Americas, The Addams Family, Mona Lisa Descending a Staircase, Cococinel, The Gingerbread Man, Astro Farm, Junglies, The Bush Baby, The Little Polar Bear, Thumbelina: A Magical Story, Delfy and His Friends, Mama wa Shōgaku 4 Nensei, Shelley Duvall's Bedtime Stories, Funnybones, Truckers, Green Legend Ran, Dog City, Tekkaman Blade, Super Dimensional Fortress Macross II: Lovers Again, My Little Pony Tales, Conan the Adventurer, Tenchi Muyo! Ryo-Ohki, The Wonderful Galaxy of Oz; Nickelodeon Animation is founded.
- 1993 – Animaniacs, The Adventures of Blinky Bill, The Nightmare Before Christmas, Once Upon a Forest, Beavis and Butt-Head, The Animals of Farthing Wood, Batman: Mask of the Phantasm, VeggieTales, 2 Stupid Dogs, Family Dog, The Thief and the Cobbler, Rocko's Modern Life, Madeline, Bonkers, Exosquad, Adventures of Sonic the Hedgehog, Sonic the Hedgehog, Biker Mice From Mars, We're Back! A Dinosaur's Story, Bob's Birthday, Transformers: Generation 2, Mobile Suit Victory Gundam, SWAT Kats: The Radical Squadron, Marsupilami, Mighty Max, Cro, The Moxy Show, Problem Child, Gogs, Droopy, Master Detective, Moldiver, The All-New Dennis the Menace, Papa Beaver's Storytime, Hurricanes, The Legends of Treasure Island, The Bots Master, Old Bear Stories, Little Women II: Jo's Boys, The New Adventures of Speed Racer, Double Dragon, Cadillacs and Dinosaurs, The Irresponsible Captain Tylor, Tales from the Cryptkeeper, The Pink Panther, Meena, Time Bokan: Royal Revival, The Wrong Trousers, GRAFx is renamed to Big Idea.
- 1994 – The Lion King, Spider-Man, The Swan Princess, The Land Before Time II: The Great Valley Adventure, The Tick, Duckman, Pom Poko, ReBoot, Magic Adventures of Mumfie, Gargoyles, The Return of Jafar, Space Ghost Coast to Coast, Bump in the Night, The Magic School Bus, Aaahh!!! Real Monsters, Mega Man, Fantastic Four, Iron Man, Mobile Fighter G Gundam, Aladdin, The Critic, Once Upon a Time... The Discoverers, Dirty Pair Flash, Montana Jones, Creepy Crawlers, The Legend of Snow White, Tico of the Seven Seas, Phantom Quest Corp., Dino Babies, Budgie the Little Helicopter, Key the Metal Idol, Macross 7, The Head, Phantom 2040, Where on Earth Is Carmen Sandiego?, Willy Fog 2, The Busy World of Richard Scarry, The Legend of White Fang, Gatchaman (OVA); DreamWorks Animation and Cartoon Network Studios are founded
- 1995 – Toy Story (the first ever feature-length film entirely animated with computer-generated CGI imagery), Neon Genesis Evangelion, Ghost in the Shell, Pinky and the Brain, Freakazoid!, Whisper of the Heart, Pocahontas, Little Bear, Balto, A Goofy Movie, Mobile Suit Gundam Wing, The Sylvester & Tweety Mysteries, Timon & Pumbaa, The Mask: Animated Series, Action League Now!, El-Hazard, Earthworm Jim, Cheez TV, The Neverending Story, Virtua Fighter, Bamboo Bears, Azuki-chan, The Little Lulu Show, Happily Ever After: Fairy Tales for Every Child, What a Cartoon!, Romeo and the Black Brothers, Dr. Katz, Professional Therapist, Life with Louie, The Mozart Band, Tenchi Universe, Magical Girl Pretty Sammy, Mr. Men and Little Miss, Daisy-Head Mayzie, The End of the World in Four Seasons, A Close Shave
- 1996 – Dexter's Laboratory, Hey Arnold!, James and the Giant Peach, Kodocha, Blue's Clues, Space Jam (marks the very first ever appearance of Lola Bunny), Arthur, Rasmus Klump (TV series), KaBlam!, Aladdin and the King of Thieves, Big Bag, Superman: The Animated Series, The Hunchback of Notre Dame, Quest, Beast Wars: Transformers, The Incredible Hulk, After War Gundam X, Mutant Turtles: Superman Legend, The Real Adventures of Jonny Quest, Sonic the Hedgehog (OVA), The Legend of Zorro, Jungle Cubs, Amazing Animals, Dennis and Gnasher, Richie Rich, Mortal Kombat: Defenders of the Realm, C Bear and Jamal, Robin, Waynehead, Road Rovers, Captain Simian & the Space Monkeys, Kratts' Creatures, Saber Marionette J, Adventures from the Book of Virtues, Stickin' Around, Martian Successor Nadesico, Little Mouse on the Prairie, The Why Why Family, All Dogs Go to Heaven: The Series, Remi, Nobody's Girl, Once Upon a Time... The Explorers, Jumanji, Project G.e.e.K.e.R., The Vision of Escaflowne, Rurouni Kenshin, Wing Commander Academy, Blazing Dragons, TV Funhouse, Magical Project S, La Salla, Eagle Riders
- 1997 – Perfect Blue, Pokémon, South Park, Princess Mononoke, Anastasia, The Land Before Time V: The Mysterious Island, Todd McFarlane's Spawn, The Old Lady and the Pigeons, Johnny Bravo, King of the Hill, Daria, Hercules, Cow and Chicken, I Am Weasel, The Angry Beavers, Cats Don't Dance, Space Goofs, Recess, Santa vs. the Snowman, The New Batman Adventures, The New Batman/Superman Adventures, The New Adventures of Zorro, Blake and Mortimer, Walter Melon, The Adventures of Paddington Bear, Freaky Stories, Ned's Newt, The Secret World of Santa Claus, Noah's Island, Pippi Longstocking, The Weird Al Show, The Adventures of Sam & Max: Freelance Police, Spicy City, Princess Sissi, Kipper, 101 Dalmatians: The Series, Nightmare Ned, Pepper Ann, Revolutionary Girl Utena, Extreme Ghostbusters, Men in Black: The Series, Franklin, Berserk, Saber Marionette J Again, The Triplets, Cartoon Sushi, Tabaluga, The New World of the Gnomes, Mach GoGoGo, Tenchi in Tokyo, Photon: The Idiot Adventures, Owzat, In the Beginning: The Bible Stories, The Mr. Men Show, Stage Fright
- 1998 – The Powerpuff Girls, Cowboy Bebop, Oggy and the Cockroaches, CatDog, Cardcaptor Sakura, Kirikou and the Sorceress, Histeria!, Anatole, Rolie Polie Olie, Oh Yeah! Cartoons, The Country Mouse and the City Mouse Adventures, Bob and Margaret, Bunny, The Wild Thornberrys, Antz, A Bug's Life, Mulan, The Prince of Egypt, Scooby-Doo on Zombie Island, Angry Kid, Serial Experiments Lain, Rex the Runt, Beast Wars II: Super Life-Form Transformers, Beast Wars II: Lio Convoy's Close Call!, Yu-Gi-Oh!, Silver Surfer, Jay Jay the Jet Plane, Rudolph the Red-Nosed Reindeer: The Movie, Super Milk Chan, Lascars, Generator Gawl, Flint the Time Detective, SMTV Live, Toonsylvania, Gasaraki, Invasion America, Stressed Eric, Shadow Raiders, Bubblegum Crisis Tokyo 2040, The Secret Files of the Spy Dogs, PB&J Otter, Noddy, Mad Jack the Pirate, Godzilla: The Series, Outlaw Star, Hercules, Celebrity Deathmatch, Saber Marionette J to X, Fancy Lala, Timbuctoo, Ketchup: Cats Who Cook, Rex the Runt
- 1999 – SpongeBob SquarePants, Family Guy, Dragon Tales, The Iron Giant, Futurama, South Park: Bigger, Longer & Uncut, My Neighbors the Yamadas, Tarzan (tenth and last Disney Renaissance film), Toy Story 2, Fantasia 2000, Digimon Adventure, Scooby-Doo! and the Witch's Ghost, Happy Tree Friends, Ed, Edd n Eddy, Batman Beyond, Home Movies, Courage the Cowardly Dog, Rocket Power, The Old Man and the Sea, Bob the Builder, Dilbert, Manuelita, Turn A Gundam, Zoids: Chaotic Century, The PJs, Cybersix, Archie's Weird Mysteries, Ojamajo Doremi, Simsala Grimm, 64 Zoo Lane, Watership Down, Downtown, Redwall, Blue Gender, Mona the Vampire, Monster Rancher, The New Woody Woodpecker Show, Now and Then, Here and There, Roughnecks: Starship Troopers Chronicles, The Big O, Little Bill, Zoboomafoo, Mission Hill, Hunter × Hunter, One Piece, Diabolik, Mickey Mouse Works, Wakko's Wish, Dual! Parallel Trouble Adventure; Xilam Animation is founded

== 2000s ==
- 2000 – Dora the Explorer, Help! I'm a Fish, 3-2-1 Penguins!, Chicken Run, Titan A.E., Aqua Teen Hunger Force, Static Shock, As Told by Ginger, Teacher's Pet, Harvey Birdman, Attorney at Law, The Emperor's New Groove, The Land Before Time VII: The Stone of Cold Fire, The Road to El Dorado, For the Birds, Sheep in the Big City, Clifford the Big Red Dog, Fetch the Vet, Inuyasha, Transformers: Robots In Disguise, Yu-Gi-Oh! Duel Monsters, X-Men: Evolution, Digimon Adventure 02, Queer Duck, Spy Groove, Wheel Squad, Seven Little Monsters, Action Man, Block 13, Baby Blues, TV Funhouse, Timothy Goes to School, Gotham Girls, Marvin the Tap-Dancing Horse, Max Steel, Grizzly Tales for Gruesome Kids, Vandread, George Shrinks, What About Mimi?, Wunschpunsch, The Weekenders, Buzz Lightyear of Star Command, The Brak Show, Brak Presents the Brak Show Starring Brak, Sealab 2021, Clerks: The Animated Series, Jackie Chan Adventures, Maggie and the Ferocious Beast, Homestar Runner, Hamtaro, Sammy, Hopla, The Boy Who Saw the Iceberg, Time Bokan 2000: Kaitou Kiramekiman
- 2001 – Shrek (which wins the first ever Academy Award for Best Animated Feature), The Fairly OddParents, Invader Zim, Samurai Jack, Spirited Away, Grim & Evil, House of Mouse, Oswald, Time Squad, El Nombre, Monsters, Inc., Waking Life, Lloyd in Space, Justice League, Yu-Gi-Oh!, The Proud Family, Atlantis: The Lost Empire, The Land Before Time VIII: The Big Freeze, Metropolis, Stanley, Totally Spies!, Braceface, Beyblade, Tootuff, Digimon Tamers, The Zeta Project, Sitting Ducks, Cubix, Broken Saints, Angelina Ballerina, The New Adventures of Lucky Luke, Final Fantasy: Unlimited, RoboRoach, Zoids: New Century, The Mummy, Sagwa, the Chinese Siamese Cat, Noir, Kirby: Right Back at Ya!, Undergrads, The Legend of Tarzan, What's with Andy?, Fruits Basket, Shaman King, The Oblongs, Aaagh! It's the Mr. Hell Show!, 12 Tiny Christmas Tales, Jimmy Neutron: Boy Genius, The Book of Pooh, Nico, The Popeye Show, 2DTV, Mazinkaiser; Gorillaz's release of their self-titled debut album; Cartoon Network launches Adult Swim, The Animator's Survival Kit is published.
- 2002 – Ice Age, Lilo & Stitch, Naruto, The Adventures of Jimmy Neutron, Boy Genius, Whatever Happened to... Robot Jones?, Cyberchase, A Town Called Panic (2002), Clone High, Spirit: Stallion of the Cimarron, Olliver's Adventures,Ozzy & Drix, ChalkZone, ¡Mucha Lucha!, Kim Possible, Treasure Planet, The Land Before Time IX: Journey to Big Water, Transformers: Armada, Teamo Supremo, The ChubbChubbs!, Codename: Kids Next Door, Kaput & Zosky, Mobile Suit Gundam SEED, Digimon Frontier, Without Me, What's New, Scooby-Doo?, Kiddy Grade, Ace Lightning, Daft Planet, Pokémon Chronicles, Stargate Infinity, MegaMan NT Warrior, Princess Tutu, Please Teacher!, Jonah: A VeggieTales Movie, Liberty's Kids, Henry's World, Witch Hunter Robin, Max & Ruby, Wallace & Gromit's Cracking Contraptions, He-Man and the Masters of the Universe, Mr. Bean: The Animated Series, Ghost in the Shell: Stand Alone Complex, Super Duper Sumos, Make Way for Noddy, Prezzemolo, Fillmore!, Phantom Investigators, The Rubbles, Gladiator Academy, Strange Invaders, Larryboy: The Cartoon Adventures, Tenchi Muyo! GXP, The Berenstain Bears, The Powerpuff Girls Movie, Rubbadubbers, Space Pirate Captain Herlock: The Endless Odyssey, Yakkity Yak; Sony Pictures Animation is founded.
- 2003 – The Grim Adventures of Billy & Mandy, All Grown Up!, Finding Nemo, The Triplets of Belleville, Teen Titans, Xiaolin Showdown, My Life as a Teenage Robot, Brother Bear, The Land Before Time X: The Great Longneck Migration, Tokyo Godfathers, Creature Comforts (TV series), The Venture Bros., Pororo the Little Penguin, Harvie Krumpet, Making Fiends, JoJo's Circus, Code Lyoko, Crazy Frog, Sinbad: Legend of the Seven Seas, Watch My Chops, Zatch Bell!, Duck Dodgers, Spider-Man: The New Animated Series, Hot Wheels: World Race, Astro Boy, New Fist of the North Star, Odd Job Jack, The Koala Brothers, Jacob Two-Two, Kaleido Star, Eddsworld, KikoRiki, Itty Bitty Heartbeats, Jakers! The Adventures of Piggley Winks, Evil Con Carne, Ninja Scroll: The Series, Little Robots, Monkey Dust, Martin Mystery, Tutenstein, Last Exile, Gungrave, Sonic X, Deafplanet, Red vs. Blue, Lilo & Stitch: The Series, Teenage Mutant Ninja Turtles, Star Wars: Clone Wars, Fullmetal Alchemist, The Animatrix, Full Metal Panic? Fumoffu, Zoids: Fuzors, Sabrina's Secret Life, Parasite Dolls, Free for All, Stuart Little, Kid Notorious, Battle Programmer Shirase, Noël Noël, Clifford's Puppy Days, Strawberry Shortcake, Kenny the Shark
- 2004 – The Incredibles, Transformers: Energon, Bleach, The SpongeBob SquarePants Movie, 6teen, Megas XLR, Foster's Home for Imaginary Friends, Drawn Together, Shrek 2, Howl's Moving Castle, The Polar Express, Atomic Betty, Peppa Pig, Hi Hi Puffy AmiYumi, Danny Phantom, The Backyardigans, Super Robot Monkey Team Hyperforce Go!, Winx Club, Futari wa Pretty Cure, Miss Spider's Sunny Patch Friends, Clifford's Really Big Movie, Postcards from Buster, Pencilmation, Maya & Miguel, W.I.T.C.H., Zeroman, Shorties Watchin' Shorties, Delta State, Yu-Gi-Oh! GX, The Super Milk Chan Show, Mobile Suit Gundam SEED Destiny, Dark Oracle, Le Portrait de Petit Cossette, Perfect Hair Forever, Higglytown Heroes, Peep and the Big Wide World, My-HiME, Dragon Booster, Stroker & Hoop, Tripping the Rift, Gankutsuou: The Count of Monte Cristo, Salad Fingers, Brandy & Mr. Whiskers, Dave the Barbarian, Tom Goes to the Mayor, The Batman, Justice League Unlimited, Samurai Champloo, Madlax, Video Mods, Phoenix, Terkel in Trouble, Tetsujin 28-go
- 2005 – Avatar: The Last Airbender, Pocoyo, Wallace & Gromit: The Curse of the Were-Rabbit, Corpse Bride, American Dad!, Robots, Madagascar, Transformers: Cybertron, The X's, 9, Xuxinha e Guto contra os Monstros do Espaço, The Boondocks, 12 oz. Mouse, Robot Chicken, The Land Before Time XI: Invasion of the Tinysauruses, Camp Lazlo, Krypto the Superdog, Charlie and Lola, Futari wa Pretty Cure Max Heart, Squidbillies, Robotboy, Little Einsteins, Pleasant Goat and Big Big Wolf, American Dragon: Jake Long, The Buzz on Maggie, Being Ian, The Life and Times of Juniper Lee, Catscratch, Anabel, Ben 10, Guyver: The Bioboosted Armor, Carl², Jane and the Dragon, Coconut Fred's Fruit Salad Island, Bratz, A.T.O.M., Lucy, the Daughter of the Devil, Hell Girl, Go, Diego, Go!, How It Should Have Ended, Doraemon, Blood+, Wonder Showzen, Moral Orel, Zoids: Genesis, Get Ed, Firehouse Tales, Toasted TV, King Arthur's Disasters, SuperNews!, The Invisible Man, Hot Wheels AcceleRacers, G.I. Joe: Sigma 6, Yakari, Toopy and Binoo, Gaiking: Legend of Daiku-Maryu, The Madagascar Penguins in a Christmas Caper, Those Scurvy Rascals, Paddle Pop Adventures; Gorillaz's release of Demon Days; Laika and Lucasfilm Animation are founded.
- 2006 – Growing Up Creepie, The Land Before Time XII: The Great Day of the Flyers, Happy Feet, Death Note, Arthur and the Minimoys, Yin Yang Yo!, Curious George, Cars, Ruby Gloom, Monster House, Wonder Pets!, Wow! Wow! Wubbzy!, Squirrel Boy, Class of 3000, The Replacements, Shorty McShorts' Shorts, Over the Hedge, Gummibär, Flushed Away, Handy Manny, Ice Age: The Meltdown, The Melancholy of Haruhi Suzumiya, Code Geass, Pucca, Peter and the Wolf, The Girl Who Leapt Through Time, The Danish Poet, Paprika, Open Season, Metalocalypse, Legion of Super Heroes, Minuscule, The Secret Show, Fantastic Four: World's Greatest Heroes, Digimon Data Squad, Fetch! with Ruff Ruffman, Kappa Mikey, El Chavo Animado, Horrid Henry, Witchblade, Ōban Star-Racers, Galactik Football, Tom and Jerry Tales, Mickey Mouse Clubhouse, Futari wa Pretty Cure Splash Star, The Emperor's New School, Frisky Dingo, Ergo Proxy, Black Lagoon, Dragon Hunters, Happy Tree Friends, Bernard, Zorro: Generation Z, Eloise: The Animated Series, Freak Show, The Adventures of Chico and Guapo, Spirou et Fantasio, IMP, Iron Kid, Sasami: Magical Girls Club, Rupert Bear, Follow the Magic..., The Amazing Adrenalini Brothers, The Owl, Purple and Brown, Teen Titans: Trouble in Tokyo
- 2007 – Phineas and Ferb, Ratatouille, Edgar & Ellen, Transformers: Animated, Sea Princesses, Bee Movie, Clang Invasion, Shrek the Third, Ricky Sprocket: Showbiz Boy, The Simpsons Movie, Enchanted, Go West! A Lucky Luke Adventure, Total Drama, Meet the Robinsons, Persepolis, Chowder, Surf's Up, WordGirl, Will and Dewitt, El Tigre: The Adventures of Manny Rivera, Shaun the Sheep, The Big Field Trip, Code Monkeys, DC Universe Animated Original Movies, Bo on the Go!, Sushi Pack, Chop Socky Chooks, The Drinky Crow Show, Camp Lazlo: Where's Lazlo?, Ani*Kuri15, Storm Hawks, Ghost Hound, The Land Before Time XIII: The Wisdom of Friends, The Land Before Time, Rick & Steve: The Happiest Gay Couple in All the World, I'm a Gummy Bear, The Infinite Quest, Super Why!, Chill Out, Scooby-Doo!, Yes! PreCure 5, Ben 10: Secret of the Omnitrix, George of the Jungle, Jefferson Anderson, Mobile Suit Gundam 00, TMNT, Bakugan Battle Brawlers, Xavier: Renegade Angel, Superjail!, Darker than Black, Gurren Lagann, El Cazador de la Bruja, My Friends Tigger & Pooh, Slacker Cats, Busytown Mysteries, Sylvanian Families (OVA), Care Bears: Adventures in Care-a-lot, Mug Travel, Dancouga Nova – Super God Beast Armor, Upin & Ipin, Kotetsushin Jeeg; Chris Meledandri leaves 20th Century Fox Animation to form his own company Illumination.
- 2008 – The Pirates Who Don't Do Anything: A VeggieTales Movie, Kung Fu Panda, Ponyo, Sid the Science Kid, Madagascar: Escape 2 Africa, The Mr. Men Show, Star Wars: The Clone Wars, Martha Speaks, Chuggington, WALL-E, BURN-E, Waltz with Bashir, Making Fiends, The Marvelous Misadventures of Flapjack, Roll No. 21, Kid vs. Kat, Batman: The Brave and the Bold, Tinker Bell, Bolt, Horton Hears a Who!, Simon's Cat, Willa's Wild Life, Animal Mechanicals, Soul Eater, As Aventuras de Gui & Estopa, Sita Sings the Blues, Random! Cartoons, Spaceballs: The Animated Series, Domo TV, Chaos;Head, Macross Frontier, World of Quest, Yes! PreCure 5 GoGo, Chhota Bheem, Michiko & Hatchin, Time of Eve, Wakfu, Yu-Gi-Oh! 5D's, Inazuma Eleven, The Secret Saturdays, Seth MacFarlane's Cavalcade of Cartoon Comedy, Cars Toons, The Life & Times of Tim, The Spectacular Spider-Man, Ben 10: Alien Force, The Penguins of Madagascar, The Heroes, Ni Hao, Kai-Lan, Stitch!, Max Steel Turbo Missions, Once Upon a Time... Planet Earth, Speed Racer: The Next Generation, The Adventures of Hello Kitty & Friends, Bert and Ernie's Great Adventures, Peanuts Motion Comics
- 2009 – Coraline, Up, Fantastic Mr. Fox, The Princess and the Frog, Wonder Woman, Ice Age: Dawn of the Dinosaurs, Astro Boy, Mary and Max, Cloudy with a Chance of Meatballs, Geng: The Adventure Begins, Prep & Landing, Archer, A Town Called Panic, Monsters vs. Aliens, Spliced, Summer Wars, The Secret of Kells, Compare the Meerkat, Logorama, Special Agent Oso, The Gruffalo, Angelina Ballerina: The Next Steps, Fishtronaut, Masha and the Bear, Pixel Pinkie, League of Super Evil, Little Krishna, Terminator Salvation: The Machinima Series, Titan Maximum, Jimmy Two-Shoes, Casper's Scare School, G.I. Joe: Resolute, Glenn Martin, DDS, Timmy Time, Ben & Holly's Little Kingdom, Dinosaur Train, The Super Hero Squad Show, Fresh Pretty Cure!, Annoying Orange, Stoked, K-On!, Fairy Tail, Fullmetal Alchemist: Brotherhood, Iron Man: Armored Adventures, Wolverine and the X-Men, Marvel Superheroes: What the--?!, Dennis the Menace and Gnasher, Popzilla, Tenchi Muyo! War on Geminar, Runaway, Mazinger Edition Z: The Impact!, Hot Wheels Battle Force 5, Jungle Junction, Ed, Edd n Eddy's Big Picture Show, Monk Little Dog.

== 2010s ==
- 2010 – Adventure Time, How to Train Your Dragon, Tangled, HeartCatch PreCure, My Little Pony: Friendship Is Magic, Despicable Me, Alphablocks, Toy Story 3, Shrek Forever After, The Ricky Gervais Show, Megamind, The Illusionist, Chico and Rita, A Cat in Paris, Regular Show, The Secret World of Arrietty, Young Justice, Kick Buttowski: Suburban Daredevil, Zig & Sharko, Mad, Transformers: Prime, Carrapatos e Catapultas, Oscar's Oasis, The Cat in the Hat Knows a Lot About That!, Monster High, Durarara!!, Mary Shelley's Frankenhole, Wallace & Gromit's World of Invention, G.I. Joe: Renegades, Marvel Anime, Angelo Rules, Panty & Stocking with Garterbelt, battle for dream island, Sym-Bionic Titan, Ugly Americans, The Disappearance of Haruhi Suzumiya, Ben 10: Ultimate Alien, Generator Rex, Angel Beats!, The Avengers: Earth's Mightiest Heroes, Octonauts, K-On!!, Scooby-Doo! Mystery Incorporated, Black Panther, The Hive, The Daltons, Pink Panther and Pals, Strawberry Shortcake's Berry Bitty Adventures, The Tatami Galaxy, The Little Prince; Gorillaz's releases of Plastic Beach and The Fall
- 2011 – Bubble Guppies, Bob's Burgers, The Adventures of Tintin, Rango, The Amazing World of Gumball, Transformers: Rescue Bots, Kung Fu Panda 2, Rio, Puss in Boots, The Fantastic Flying Books of Mr. Morris Lessmore, Winnie the Pooh, From Up on Poppy Hill, Jelly Jamm, Puella Magi Madoka Magica, Trunk Train, FloopaLoo, Where Are You?, Jake and the Never Land Pirates, Ninjago: Masters of Spinjitzu, Don't Hug Me I'm Scared, Scaredy Squirrel, Crash Canyon, Larva, Tiger & Bunny, Dan Vs., Green Lantern: The Animated Series, ThunderCats (2011), Kung Fu Panda: Legends of Awesomeness, The Looney Tunes Show, Wild Kratts, Steins;Gate, China, IL, Thor & Loki: Blood Brothers, Fate/Zero, Hunter × Hunter, Anohana, Voltron Force, Arthur Christmas, Nichijou, DC Nation Shorts, Canimals, Om Nom Stories, Toy Story Toons, Inanimate Insanity
- 2012 – Gravity Falls, ParaNorman, The Legend of Korra, The Lorax, Brave, Wreck-It Ralph, Ice Age: Continental Drift, Madagascar 3: Europe's Most Wanted, Hotel Transylvania, Littlest Pet Shop, Teenage Mutant Ninja Turtles (2012), Robot and Monster, Paperman, Doc McStuffins, Dumb Ways to Die, Ernest & Celestine, Randy Cunningham: 9th Grade Ninja, Ben 10: Destroy All Aliens, Maya the Bee, DreamWorks Dragons, Star Blazers: Space Battleship Yamato 2199, Wild Grinders, Exchange Student Zero, Daniel Tiger's Neighborhood, Rise of the Guardians, The Lingo Show, Fugget About It, Slugterra, Barbie: Life in the Dreamhouse, Smile PreCure!, Motu Patlu, Napoleon Dynamite, Big Block SingSong, Ben 10: Omniverse, Tron: Uprising, JoJo's Bizarre Adventure, Black Dynamite, Bravest Warriors, Motorcity, Care Bears: Welcome to Care-a-Lot, Tree Fu Tom, Lupin the Third: The Woman Called Fujiko Mine, Boonie Bears, Heroes of the City, Rovio Animation is founded.
- 2013 – Frozen, Paw Patrol, Monsters University, Rick and Morty, RWBY, Attack on Titan, Epic, The Wind Rises, Steven Universe, The Croods, Despicable Me 2, The Tale of the Princess Kaguya, Boy and the World, Hubert & Takako, Doki (2013), Camp Lakebottom, Julius Jr., Grojband, Sofia the First, DokiDoki! PreCure, Packages from Planet X, Haunted Tales for Wicked Kids, Transformers Prime Beast Hunters: Predacons Rising, Turbo, Wander Over Yonder, Mickey Mouse (2013), Transformers Go!, Little Witch Academia, Get a Horse!, Tenkai Knights, Creative Galaxy, High School USA!, Sarah & Duck, Angry Birds Toons, Golan the Insatiable, Lucas Bros. Moving Co., Legends of Chima, Xiaolin Chronicles, Max Steel, Rabbids Invasion, Hulk and the Agents of S.M.A.S.H., Bee and PuppyCat, Beware the Batman, Peg + Cat, Lalaloopsy, Axe Cop, Avengers Assemble, Ghost in the Shell: Arise, Sabrina: Secrets of a Teenage Witch, Gatchaman Crowds, Henry Hugglemonster, Pac-Man and the Ghostly Adventures, Pakdam Pakdai, Chakra: The Invincible, Animanimals
- 2014 – Rio 2, BoJack Horseman, Over the Garden Wall, Big Hero 6, The Book of Life, How to Train Your Dragon 2, The Boxtrolls, Penguins of Madagascar, Mr. Peabody & Sherman, Star Wars Rebels, Clarence, Kate & Mim-Mim, When Marnie Was There, Tumble Leaf, Get Ace, Song of the Sea, Earth to Luna!, Feast, Jorel's Brother, The Lego Movie, Numb Chucks, Lava, All Hail King Julien, Blaze and the Monster Machines, Super Wings, Hey Duggee, Sailor Moon Crystal, Mike Tyson Mysteries, The Tom and Jerry Show, Yu-Gi-Oh! Arc-V, Marvel Disk Wars: The Avengers, Gundam Reconguista in G, Little Astro Boy, Meshimase Lodoss-tō Senki: Sorette Oishii no?, TripTank, VeggieTales in the House, Ai Tenchi Muyo!, Peanuts, Angry Birds Stella, Piggy Tales, The Doozers, Stand by Me Doraemon, Mixels, HappinessCharge Pretty Cure!, LoliRock, Sheriff Callie's Wild West, Numb Chucks
- 2015 – Miraculous: Tales of Ladybug & Cat Noir, Inside Out, The Good Dinosaur, Shaun the Sheep Movie, Star vs. the Forces of Evil, F Is for Family, Minions, We Bare Bears, Pickle and Peanut, Supernoobs, Anomalisa, Transformers: Robots in Disguise (2015), The Little Prince, The Peanuts Movie, Inspector Gadget (2015), Puffin Rock, New Looney Tunes, Descendants: Wicked World, SuperMansion, Mighty Magiswords, Nexo Knights, Go! Princess Pretty Cure, Justice League: Gods and Monsters Chronicles, PJ Masks, Thunderbirds Are Go, Mobile Suit Gundam: Iron-Blooded Orphans, Total Drama Presents: The Ridonculous Race, Harvey Beaks, The Adventures of Puss in Boots, Guardians of the Galaxy, Vixen, Molang, DC Super Hero Girls, Two More Eggs, Bob the Builder, Dragon Ball Super, Moonbeam City, Danger Mouse, Lost in Oz, Mr. Osomatsu, Popples, Care Bears & Cousins, Lupin the 3rd Part IV: The Italian Adventure, My Magic Pet Morphle, Miles from Tomorrowland, Goldie & Bear, GG Bond, Regular Show: The Movie, H2O: Mermaid Adventures, Sick Bricks, The SpongeBob Movie: Sponge Out of Water, Home
- 2016 – The Loud House, My Hero Academia, Zootopia, Kung Fu Panda 3, Transformers: Combiner Wars, Sing, The Haunted House, Moana, The Angry Birds Movie, Finding Dory, The Secret Life of Pets, Your Name, Kubo and the Two Strings, Storks, Milo Murphy's Law, Trolls, Tales of Arcadia, The Red Turtle, Piper, Bunnicula, A Silent Voice, My Life as a Courgette, BoBoiBoy The Movie, Voltron: Legendary Defender, Dot., Pokémon Generations, Skylanders Academy, Ask the StoryBots, Lego Star Wars: The Freemaker Adventures, Brotherhood: Final Fantasy XV, Elena of Avalor, Witchy Pretty Cure!, Fantasy Patrol, Justice League Action, Son of Zorn, Pokémon the Series: XYZ, Looped, Atomic Puppet, Camp Camp, The Lion Guard, Digimon Universe: App Monsters, Noddy, Toyland Detective, Future-Worm!, Camp WWE, Right Now Kapow, Legends of Chamberlain Heights, Macross Delta, Go Away, Unicorn!, Greatest Party Story Ever, Tiger Mask W, Rainbow Ruby, Lamput, Grizzy & the Lemmings; Steve Cutts releases Moby's Are You Lost In The World Like Me?
- 2017 – OK K.O.! Let's Be Heroes, The Heroic Quest of the Valiant Prince Ivandoe, If You Give a Mouse a Cookie, Angry Birds Blues, Oswaldo, Papaya Bull, Lucas the Spider, DuckTales (2017), Baahubali: The Lost Legends, Castlevania, Transformers: Titans Return, Numberblocks, True and the Rainbow Kingdom, Villainous, The Breadwinner, In a Heartbeat, Big Mouth, Coco, Loving Vincent, Hanazuki: Full of Treasures, Despicable Me 3, Trulli Tales, Ferdinand, Cars 3, Captain Underpants: The First Epic Movie, Mickey Mouse Mixed-Up Adventures, The Magic School Bus Rides Again, Vampirina, Spirit Riding Free, Puppy Dog Pals, Freedom Fighters: The Ray, Mike Judge Presents: Tales from the Tour Bus, Unikitty!, Big Hero 6: The Series, Star Wars Forces of Destiny, Spider-Man, Rapunzel's Tangled Adventure, Yu-Gi-Oh! VRAINS, Marvel Super Hero Adventures, Marvel Future Avengers, Ant-Man, Rocket & Groot, Stitch & Ai, Billy Dilley's Super-Duper Subterranean Summer, Dennis & Gnasher: Unleashed!, Jeff & Some Aliens, VeggieTales in the City, Lou, Belle and Sebastian, Hey Arnold!: The Jungle Movie, Gorillaz's release of Humanz, Glitch Productions is founded.
- 2018 – Bluey, Hilda, Incredibles 2, Aggretsuko, The Dragon Prince, Isle of Dogs, Harvey Girls Forever!, Big City Greens, Disenchantment, Summer Camp Island, Spider-Man: Into the Spider-Verse, Ralph Breaks the Internet, Smallfoot, Mirai, The Grinch, Final Space, Taffy, Dragon Ball Super: Broly, Bitz & Bob, Craig of the Creek, She-Ra and the Princesses of Power, Let's Go Luna!, Chip and Potato, Apple & Onion, Early Man; Gorillaz release of The Now Now, Transformers: Power of the Primes, Transformers: Cyberverse, Super Drags, Super Dragon Ball Heroes, Rise of the Teenage Mutant Ninja Turtles, Constantine: City of Demons, Zoids Wild, Watership Down, Legend of the Three Caballeros, Muppet Babies, Lupin the 3rd Part V: Misadventures in France, Ballmastrz: 9009, Subway Surfers: The Animated Series, The Hollow, Mega Man: Fully Charged, Spy Kids: Mission Critical
- 2019 – How to Train Your Dragon: The Hidden World, Victor and Valentino, Corn & Peg, Infinity Train, The Last Kids on Earth, Mao Mao: Heroes of Pure Heart, Harley Quinn, T.O.T.S., SparkShorts, Amphibia, Frozen 2, Meta Runner, Upin & Ipin: The Lone Gibbon Kris, Abominable, Green Eggs and Ham, Ne Zha, Weathering with You, DC Super Hero Girls, Clifford the Big Red Dog (2019), Carmen Sandiego, Blue's Clues & You!, Abby Hatcher, Undone, Hair Love, I Lost My Body, Missing Link, Klaus, Toy Story 4, The Angry Birds Movie 2, Spies in Disguise, Primal, Tuca & Bertie, Twelve Forever, Archibald's Next Big Thing, BoBoiBoy Movie 2, Love, Death & Robots, Demon Slayer: Kimetsu no Yaiba, Transformers: Rescue Bots Academy, Fast & Furious Spy Racers, Scooby-Doo and Guess Who?, Knights of the Zodiac: Saint Seiya, Forky Asks a Question, Trailer Park Boys: The Animated Series, Fruits Basket, Power Players, Garfield Originals, Go Astro Boy Go!, Xavier Riddle and the Secret Museum, The Adventures of Paddington, Fantasy Patrol: The Chronicles, Steven Universe: The Movie, Filly Funtasia, The VeggieTales Show, Sherwood, Moominvalley, Dororo, Snoopy in Space, Care Bears: Unlock the Magic, Monster Beach, Mr. Magoo, Gigantosaurus, Ejen Ali: The Movie, Sadie Sparks, The Rocketeer, Steven Universe Future, Rocko's Modern Life: Static Cling, Invader Zim: Enter the Florpus; Kyoto Animation's first studio becomes the victim of an arson attack that kills 36 people

== 2020s ==
- 2020 – Wolfwalkers, The Owl House, Doraemon: Nobita's New Dinosaur, Beastars, Onward, Soul, Central Park, The Midnight Gospel, Jujutsu Kaisen, Close Enough, 100% Wolf, Over the Moon, YOLO; Gorillaz's release of Song Machine, Season One: Strange Timez, Nahuel and the Magic Book, Transformers: War for Cybertron Trilogy, Demon Slayer: Kimetsu no Yaiba – The Movie: Mugen Train, Yashahime, The Wonderful World of Mickey Mouse, Deathstroke: Knights & Dragons, Keep Your Hands Off Eizouken!, Animaniacs (2020), Jurassic World Camp Cretaceous, Blood of Zeus, Star Trek: Lower Decks, Looney Tunes Cartoons, Helluva Boss, Yu-Gi-Oh! Sevens, Digimon Adventure, Tooning Out the News, My Little Pony: Pony Life, Dragon Quest: The Adventure of Dai, Solar Opposites, Mira, Royal Detective, Stand by Me Doraemon 2, Adventure Time: Distant Lands, Tig n' Seek, The Fungies, Rhyme Time Town, Topo Gigio, We Bare Bears: The Movie, Ben 10 Versus the Universe: The Movie, Elinor Wonders Why, Phineas and Ferb the Movie: Candace Against the Universe
- 2021 – Middlemost Post, Kid Cosmic, Transformers: Earthrise, Inside Job, Sunset Paradise, Arcane, Encanto, Sing 2, Luca, The Mitchells vs. the Machines, HouseBroken, Invincible, Mad God, What If...? (as part of the Marvel Cinematic Universe's series of shows for Disney+), Raya and the Last Dragon, Robin Robin, Gabby's Dollhouse, Dino Ranch, The Ghost and Molly McGee, Transformers: Kingdom, The Great North, Monsters at Work, Masters of the Universe: Revelation, Centaurworld, The Prince, Super Crooks, Blade Runner: Black Lotus, The Croods: Family Tree, Dug Days, Star Trek: Prodigy, M.O.D.O.K., Resident Evil: Infinite Darkness, Santa Inc., Star Wars: Visions, Star Wars: The Bad Batch, Hit-Monkey, Spidey and His Amazing Friends, Digimon Ghost Game, Tom and Jerry Special Shorts, Tom and Jerry in New York, He-Man and the Masters of the Universe, Jellystone!, Murder Drones, Birdgirl, Godzilla Singular Point, Mickey Mouse Funhouse, Little Ellen, Yabba Dabba Dinosaurs, Aquaman: King of Atlantis, The Snoopy Show, Oggy and the Cockroaches: Next Generation, Oggy Oggy, Lupin the 3rd Part 6, Strawberry Shortcake: Berry in the Big City, The Chicken Squad, Pixar Popcorn, Elliott from Earth, Johnny Test, Alma's Way, Mechamato, Long Gone Gulch, Ridley Jones, Maca & Roni, Straight Outta Nowhere: Scooby-Doo! Meets Courage the Cowardly Dog, Hero City Kids Force, Toon In With Me, Karma's World, Tuttle Twins, Do, Re & Mi
- 2022 – Angry Birds: Summer Madness, Guillermo del Toro's Pinocchio, We Baby Bears, Smiling Friends, Transformers: BotBots, Hamster and Gretel, Marcel the Shell with Shoes On, Doraemon: Nobita's Little Star Wars 2021, Turning Red, Chip 'n Dale: Rescue Rangers (2022), Lightyear, The Bad Guys, The Boy, the Mole, the Fox and the Horse, Minions: The Rise of Gru, DC League of Super-Pets, Monster High (2022), Monster High: The Movie, Strange World, Puss in Boots: The Last Wish, Transformers: EarthSpark, Kung Fu Panda: The Dragon Knight, El Deafo, Sonic Prime, Beavis and Butt-Head Do the Universe, Tekken: Bloodline, The Proud Family: Louder and Prouder, Dragon Ball Super: Super Hero, The Guardians of Justice, Zootopia+, The Legend of Vox Machina, The Guardians of Justice, Super Giant Robot Brothers, The Cuphead Show!, Tales of the Jedi, Rosie's Rules, Doomlands, Bleach: Thousand-Year Blood War, I Am Groot, Slippin' Jimmy, Yu-Gi-Oh! Go Rush!!, Oddballs, Baymax!, Supernatural Academy, Samurai Rabbit: The Usagi Chronicles, Mobile Suit Gundam: The Witch from Mercury, Urusei Yatsura, Action Pack, The Creature Cases, Human Resources, Saving Me, Me & Mickey, Bugs Bunny Builders, The Sea Beast, Farzar, Ice Age: Scrat Tales, Slow Loop, Batwheels, Aoashi, Wendell & Wild, Batman and Superman: Battle of the Super Sons, Cars on the Road, Mecha Builders, Star Wars Tales, Alice's Wonderland Bakery, Eureka!, Firebuds, Chibiverse, Fairview, My Little Pony: Make Your Mark, My Little Pony: Tell Your Tale, The Boys Presents: Diabolical, Spy x Family, Mechamato Movie, Colourblocks, The Amazing Maurice
- 2023 – Once Upon a Studio, Playdate with Winnie the Pooh, Doraemon: Nobita's Sky Utopia, Didi & Friends the Movie, Wish, The Super Mario Bros. Movie, Spider-Man: Across the Spider-Verse, Krapopolis, Chicken Run: Dawn of the Nugget, Moon Girl and Devil Dinosaur, Hailey's On It!, Kiff, Teenage Mutant Ninja Turtles: Mutant Mayhem, SuperKitties, War Is Over!, The Boy and the Heron, Pupstruction, My Adventures with Superman, Migration, Rubble & Crew, Robot Dreams, Leo, Elemental, Star Wars: Young Jedi Adventures, Rurouni Kenshin, Trigun Stampede, Koala Man, Agent Elvis, Pokémon Concierge, Skull Island, Castlevania: Nocturne, Nier: Automata Ver1.1a, Tiny Toons Looniversity, Work It Out Wombats!, Chibi Godzilla Raids Again, Jessica's Big Little World, Adventure Time: Fionna and Cake, Gremlins: Secrets of the Mogwai, Digman!, Unicorn Academy, Cocomelon Lane, The Amazing Digital Circus, Velma; Gorillaz's release of Cracker Island
- 2024 – Grimsburg, Dora, Hazbin Hotel, Orion and the Dark, The Tiger's Apprentice, Lyla in the Loop, Rock Paper Scissors, Doraemon: Nobita's Earth Symphony, Iwájú, Kung Fu Panda 4, Transformers One, X-Men '97, Tales of the Teenage Mutant Ninja Turtles, Despicable Me 4, Inside Out 2, The Wild Robot, Beyblade X, Spellbound, Ariel, Moana 2, Zombies: The Re-Animated Series, WondLa, Sausage Party: Foodtopia, Exploding Kittens, Primos, Baahubali: Crown of Blood, Batman: Caped Crusader, Terminator Zero, Twilight of the Gods, The Fairly OddParents: A New Wish, Suicide Squad Isekai, Kite Man: Hell Yeah!, Angry Birds Mystery Island, Wallace & Gromit: Vengeance Most Fowl, 200% Wolf, That Christmas, Dream Productions, Hitpig!, Jentry Chau vs. the Underworld, Ark: The Animated Series, Universal Basic Guys, Kindergarten: The Musical, The Lord of the Rings: The War of the Rohirrim, Memoir of a Snail, Hot Wheels Let's Race, Knuckles, Rising Impact, Invincible Fight Girl, Uzumaki, Dan Da Dan, Secret Level, Creature Commandos, Moonrise, Dragon Ball Daima, Time Patrol Bon, Dongeng Sang Kancil, Craig Before the Creek, Carl the Collector
- 2025 – Wylde Pak, Dog Man, Elio, Doraemon: Nobita's Art World Tales, Ne Zha 2, Zootopia 2, Gabby's Dollhouse: The Movie, The SpongeBob Movie: Search for SquarePants, The Bad Guys 2, RoboGobo, The Day the Earth Blew Up: A Looney Tunes Movie, Win or Lose, Weather Hunters, Mickey Mouse Clubhouse+, Common Side Effects, StuGo, Your Friendly Neighborhood Spider-Man, Wonderblocks, Eyes of Wakanda, Marvel Zombies, Oh My God... Yes!, Wolf King, KPop Demon Hunters, Ejen Ali The Movie 2, Demon Slayer: Kimetsu no Yaiba – The Movie: Infinity Castle, Bearbrick, Iyanu, Plankton: The Movie, #1 Happy Family USA, Dino Ranch: Island Explorers, The King of Kings, Iron Man and His Awesome Friends, David, Chainsaw Man – The Movie: Reze Arc, Jumbo, Predator: Killer of Killers, Skillsville, The Wonderfully Weird World of Gumball, Falcon Express, Knights of Guinevere, Papa Zola The Movie, Haha, You Clowns, The Girl Who Cried Pearls
- 2026 – Goat, Garfield, Ted: The Animated Series, Hoppers, The Super Mario Galaxy Movie, Paw Patrol: The Dino Movie, Toy Story 5, Sofia the First: Royal Magic, Magicampers, Dragon Striker, Among Us, Coyote vs. Acme, BeddyByes, Regular Show: The Lost Tapes, Minions & Monsters, The Angry Birds Movie 3, Shaun the Sheep: The Beast of Mossy Bottom, Animal Farm (2026), Adventure Time: Side Quests, Los Colorado, Steps, The Cat in the Hat (2026), Hexed, Forgotten Island, Avatar Aang: The Last Airbender, Avatar: Seven Havens, Swapped, Ray Gunn, Wildwood, Calling All Villains, Stranger Things: Tales from '85, Hey A.J.!, Phoebe & Jay, Gameoverse

== See also ==
- History of animation
- Lists of animated films
- Lists of animated television series
- List of years in anime
- Firsts in animation

== External References ==
- Bendazzi, Giannalberto (1994). Cartoons: One hundred years of cinema animation. Indiana University Press. ISBN 0253209374.
- Crafton, Donald (2014), "Cinema Chez Gaumont", Emile Cohl, Caricature, and Film, Princeton University Press, ISBN 978-1400860715
- de Vries, Tjitte; Mul, Ati (2009), "28 Animation Pictures and Two Inserts", "They Thought it was a Marvel": Arthur Melbourne-Cooper (1874-1961) : Pioneer of Puppet Animation, Amsterdam University Press, ISBN 978-9085550167
- Dobson, Nichola (2010), "Chronology", The A to Z of Animation and Cartoons, Rowman & Littlefield, ISBN 978-0810876231
- Niver, Kemp R. (1985), "Fun in a Bakery Shop", Early Motion Pictures: The Paper Print Collection in the Library of Congress, Motion Picture, Broadcasting, and Recorded Sound Division, Library of Congress, ISBN 978-0844404639
- Myrent, Glenn (1989). "Emile Reynaud: First Motion Picture Cartoonist". Film History. 3 (3). Indiana University Press: 191–202. JSTOR 3814977.
- Rossell, Deac (1995). "A Chronology of Cinema, 1889-1896". Film History. 7 (2). Indiana University Press: 115–236. JSTOR 3815166.
- Stewart, Jez (2021), "Signing In and Signing Up", The Story of British Animation, Bloomsbury Publishing, ISBN 9781911239727
