= 1857 in animation =

Events in 1857 in animation.

== Events ==
- Specific date unknown:
  - In 1857, the earliest known illustration of a vertical biunial magic lantern, probably provided by E.G. Wood, appeared in the Horne & Thornthwaite catalogue. Biunial lanterns, with two projecting optical sets in one apparatus, were produced to more easily project dissolving views.
  - In 1857, the social reformer Florence Nightingale produced "coxcombs" as part of a campaign to improve sanitary conditions in the British Army. It was an early example two-dimensional example of scientific visualization. This prefigured modern scientific visualization techniques that use computer graphics.

== Births ==
=== January ===
- January 4: Émile Cohl, French comics artist, caricaturist and film director (Fantasmagorie), (d. 1938).

=== Specific date unknown ===
- Romeyn Beck Hough, American botanist and physician (he sold magic lantern and microscope slides made from the thinnest transverse sections), (d. 1924).
- George R. Tweedie, English businessman, (he gained fame in 1891 by running a popular magic lantern show, titled "Gossip about Ghosts". The show, which cost sixpence, consisted of fifty slides, each illustrating a story about ghosts or supernatural occurrences), (d. 1937).
