= 1858 in animation =

Events in 1858 in animation.

== Events ==
- April: John Gorham patented his Kaleidoscopic colour-top. This is a top on which two small discs are placed, usually one with colors and a black one with cut-out patterns. When the discs spin and the top disc is retarded into regular jerky motions the toy exhibits "beautiful forms which are similar to those of the kaleidoscope" with multiplied colours. Gorham described how the colours appear mixed on the spinning top "from the duration of successive impressions on the retina". Gorham founded the principle on "the well-known experiment of whirling a stick, ignited at one end" (a.k.a. the sparkler's trail effect). His device was based on the concept of the persistence of vision, a suggested explanation for motion perception in optical toys like the phenakistiscope and the zoetrope, and later in cinema.
- Specific date unknown:
  - The physicist Joseph-Charles d'Almeida published descriptions of two methods that he had successfully developed to project stereoscopic images. The first was an anaglyph method with red and green glasses, the second used the stroboscopic principle to alternately present each picture to the corresponding eye in quick succession. D'Almeida had started work on combining this method with the principles of the phenakistiscope.
  - In France, Joseph-Charles d'Almeida delivered a report to l'Académie des sciences. He described how to project three-dimensional magic lantern slide shows using red and green filters to an audience wearing red and green goggles. Subsequently, he was chronicled as being responsible for the first realisation of 3D images using anaglyphs.
  - The Hungarian engineer S. Pilcher introduced the Astrometeoroscope or Astrometroscope: a large slide that projected a lacework of dots forming constantly changing geometrical line patterns, compared with stars and meteors. It used a very ingenious mechanism with two metal plates obliquely crossed with slits that moved to and fro in contrary directions. Except for when the only known example was used in a performance, it was kept locked away at the Polytechnic so no one could discover the secret technique. When the Polytechnic auctioned the device, Picher eventually paid an extravagant price for his own invention to keep its workings secret.
  - The English American artist George Henry Burgess resumed his search for gold. Burgess followed the Fraser River Gold Rush in British Columbia, voyaging upriver by canoe. He sold one of his paintings to Governor James Douglas. Burgess returned with many sketches, which he then transferred to glass and exhibited by magic lantern show.

== Sources ==
- The Bay of San Francisco: The Metropolis of the Pacific Coast and its Suburban Cities. A History. Vol. II. Chicago: The Lewis Publishing Company. 1892. pp. 184–185 – via Internet Archive.
- "Fraser River Delineated". Daily National Democrat. Marysville, California. 28 October 1859. Archived from the original on 3 January 2022 – via Newspapers.com.
