= 1895 in animation =

Events in 1895 in animation.

== Events ==
- August 28: Release of the film The Execution of Mary Stuart, directed by Alfred Clark. It is the first known film to use special effects, specifically the stop trick. Stop motion is closely related to the stop trick, in which the camera is temporarily stopped during the recording of a scene to create a change before filming is continued (or for which the cause of the change is edited out of the film). In the resulting film, the change will be sudden and a logical cause of the change will be mysteriously absent or replaced with a fake cause that is suggested in the scene. The technique of stop motion can be interpreted as repeatedly applying the stop trick.

== Births ==
=== February ===
- February 27: Edward Brophy, American comedian and actor (voice of Timothy Q. Mouse in Dumbo), (d. 1960).

=== March ===
- March 4: Milt Gross, American cartoonist and animator (Bray Productions, Metro-Goldwyn-Mayer cartoon studio, Screen Gems, adapted his comic strip Count Screwloose into two animated short films), (d. 1953).
- March 23: Larry Grey, English magician (voice of Bill the Lizard in Alice in Wonderland), (d. 1951).

=== April ===
- April 4: Tack Knight, American animator and comics artist (Animated Film Corporation, Walt Disney Company, Fleischer Brothers, The Adventures of Horace Cope), (d. 1976).
- April 22: Margaret J. Winkler, American animation producer and film distributor, credited as the first woman to produce and distribute animated films, (Pat Sullivan, Fleischer Brothers, Walt Disney, founder of Screen Gems) and wife of Charles Mintz, (d. 1990).
- April 30: Verena Ruegg, American animator, camerawoman, and painter, (worked in the ink and paint department of both the Walt Disney Studios and Warner Bros. Cartoons, camerawoman for the animation process during World War II), (d. 1973).

=== May ===
- May 19: Albert Hay Malotte, American pianist, organist, composer and educator (Walt Disney Animation Studios), (d. 1964).
- May 21: Ben Hardaway, American animator (Looney Tunes, worked for Walter Lantz), (d. 1957).

=== June ===
- June 14: Cliff Edwards, American singer, musician and actor (voice of Jiminy Cricket in Pinocchio, Fun and Fancy Free and From All of Us to All of You, and Jim Crow in Dumbo), (d. 1971).

=== August ===
- August 7: Alain Saint-Ogan, French comics writer, artist and animator (adapted his comic Prosper L'Ours into a 1934 animated short), (d. 1974).

=== September ===
- September 28: Dave Franklin, American songwriter and pianist (co-wrote "The Merry-Go-Round Broke Down" for Looney Tunes), (d. 1970).

=== November ===
- November 4:
  - Jack King, American animator, film director and comics artist (J.R. Bray, International Film Service, Walt Disney Company, Warner Bros. Cartoons), (d. 1958).
  - Ben Sharpsteen, American animation director and film producer, (sequence director for Snow White and the Seven Dwarfs, supervising director for Pinocchio and Dumbo, production supervisor for Fantasia, Fun and Fancy Free, Melody Time, The Adventures of Ichabod and Mr. Toad, Cinderella, and Alice in Wonderland), (d. 1980).

=== October ===
- October 20: Rex Ingram, American actor (narrator in John Henry and the Inky-Poo), (d. 1969).

== Sources ==
- Barrier, Michael (2003), "Warner Bros., 1933-1940", Hollywood Cartoons: American Animation in Its Golden Age, Oxford University Press, ISBN 978-0199839223
- Cohen, Karl F. (2004), "Censorship of Theatrical Animation", Forbidden Animation: Censored Cartoons and Blacklisted Animators in America, McFarland & Company, ISBN 978-0786420322
- Lenburg, Jeff (2006), "King, Jack", Who's who in Animated Cartoons: An International Guide to Film and Television's Award-Winning and Legendary Animators, Hal Leonard Corporation, ISBN 978-1557836717
- Leonard Maltin; Of Mice and Magic: A History of American Animated Cartoons; Penguin Books; ISBN 0-452-25993-2 (1980, 1987)
- Russell Merritt and J. B. Kaufman; Walt in Wonderland: The Silent Films of Walt Disney; Johns Hopkins University Press; ISBN 0-8018-4907-1 (paperback, 1993)
