= 1901 in animation =

Events in 1901 in animation.

== Films released ==
- Specific date unknown: Dolly’s Toys. British trick film, directed by Arthur Melbourne-Cooper. It may have used stop-motion animation, or a variant of the stop-action technique previously used by Walter R. Booth.

== Births ==
=== January ===
- January 21: André Daix, French animator and comics artist (Professeur Nimbus), (d. 1976).

=== March ===
- March 1: Jan Kraan, Dutch illustrator, animator and comics artist, (d. 1988).
- March 24: Ub Iwerks, American animator, cartoonist, character designer, inventor, and special effects technician (designed Mickey Mouse, Clarabelle Cow, and Horace Horsecollar, creator of Flip the Frog and Willie Whopper, founder of Iwerks Studio, chief animator on the Laugh-O-Gram Studio, worked on the Alice Comedies, Oswald the Lucky Rabbit, Silly Symphony, ComiColor Cartoons, Looney Tunes, and Color Rhapsody series, special visual effects artist for Song of the South), (d. 1971).
- March 27: Carl Barks, American animator and comics artist (Walt Disney Company), (d. 2000).

=== April ===
- April 18: Alexandre Alexeieff, Russian animator, film director (The Nose, Pictures at an Exhibition), inventor (pinscreen) and producer, (d. 1982).
- April 28: Yuri Merkulov, Russian animator and film director (Bratishkin's Adventures), (d. 1979).

=== May ===
- May 20: Ferdinand Diehl, German animator and film director (The Seven Ravens, Mecki), (d. 1992).

=== June ===
- June 12: Clyde Geronimi, Italian-American animation director (Bray Productions, Walter Lantz Productions, Walt Disney Company), (d. 1989).
- June 29: Nelson Eddy, American singer and actor (narrator and voice of Willie the Whale in "The Whale Who Wanted to Sing at the Met" in Make Mine Music), (d. 1967).

=== July ===
- July 5: Len Lye, New Zealand artist, filmmaker, and animation director, (The Peanut Vendor, A Colour Box, Rainbow Dance, Free Radicals). (d. 1980).

=== August ===
- August 4: Louis Armstrong, American jazz trumpeter, composer and singer (appeared as a giant floating head in the Betty Boop cartoon I'll Be Glad When You're Dead You Rascal You), (d. 1971).
- August 7: Sid Sutherland, American animator, screenwriter and sound editor (Walter Lantz Productions, Warner Bros. Cartoons), (d. 1968).
- August 12: Bob Kuwahara, Japanese-American animator and comics artist (Walt Disney Animation Studios, Metro-Goldwyn-Mayer cartoon studio, Terrytoons), (d. 1964).

=== October ===
- October 1: Homer Brightman, American screenwriter (Walt Disney Company, Walter Lantz, MGM, UPA, Larry Harmon Pictures, Cambria Productions, DePatie-Freleng Enterprises) and comics writer, (d. 1988).
- October 20: Frank Churchill, American composer and songwriter (Walt Disney Animation Studios), (d. 1942).
- October 28: Bob Rothberg, American songwriter and lyricist (Fleischer Studios), (d. 1938).

=== November ===
- November 21: Franzisca Baruch, German–Israeli graphic designer, and character designer, (designed characters and titles for the animated film Goethe is Alive!), (d. 1989).

=== December ===
- December 5: Walt Disney, American animator, film producer, (The Walt Disney Company), and entrepreneur (developed and voiced the character of Mickey Mouse, pioneered the use of synchronized sound, full-color three-strip Technicolor, and feature-length films in American animation), (d. 1966).

== Sources ==
- Andrae, Tom (2006). Carl Barks and the Disney Comic Book: Unmasking the Myth of Modernity. University Press of Mississippi. ISBN 1-57806-858-4.
- Crafton, Donald (2015), "The Trickfilm Tradition", Before Mickey:The Animated Film 1898-1928, University of Chicago Press, ISBN 978-0226231020
- Stewart, Jez (2021), "Signing In and Signing Up", The Story of British Animation, Bloomsbury Publishing, ISBN 9781911239727
