= 1855 in animation =

Events in 1855 in animation.

== Events ==
- August 12: The Afonso Henriques Theatre was inaugurated with a masquerade ball. It was baptized with the name of Portugal's first king, Dom Afonso Henriques, making official the name Theatro Dom Affonso Henriques, later modified due to various orthographic reforms. The theatre contributed to the completion of the Santos Passos Church by donating funds received from plays and magic lantern slide shows.
- Specific date unknown:
  - In 1855, the Austrian-German physiologist Johann Nepomuk Czermak published an article about his Stereophoroskop and other experiments aimed at stereoscopic moving images. He mentioned a method of sticking needles in a stroboscopic disc so that it looked like one needle was being pushed in and out of the cardboard when animated. He realized that this method provided basically endless possibilities to make different 3D animations. He then introduced two methods to animate stereoscopic pairs of images, one was basically a stereo viewer using two stroboscopic discs and the other was more or less similar to the later zoetrope. Czermak explained how suitable stereoscopic photographs could be made by recording a series of models, for instance to animate a growing pyramid.
  - In 1855, the physician John Snow used a dot map to visualise the 1854 Broad Street cholera outbreak. It is an early two-dimensional example of scientific visualization, and it prefigured modern scientific visualization techniques that use computer graphics. Snow collected data about the individual cases of the cholera outbreak, especially their location in Soho, using nascent methods of spatial analysis and contact tracing to conclude that contaminated water was the disease vector, and successfully had the source shut off. The map that accompanied his 1855 report showed individual cases, stacked at each house location, clearly showing a concentration around the Broad Street Pump as well as gaps in locations that had other water sources.
  - Publication of Al-Saq ‘ala al-Saq (1855) by Ahmad Faris al-Shidyaq. It is a modern example of the maqama genre of picaresque short stories. The illustrations of the genre tend to share formal qualities with the art of shadow play. Shadow plays are considered a precursor to silhouette animation.
  - In 1855, Count Franz Graf von Pocci and Josef Leonhard Schmid established the Munich Marionette Theatre in Munich, Bavaria, Germany. Pocci hired the premises, drew stage curtains and designs, and wrote pieces for the hero of Schmid's shows, Kasperl Larifari, a descendant of Hans Wurst and all the classical comic figures in traditional European puppetry. This collaboration was highly influential and is credited with inspiring the formation of other theaters. Pocci was a shadow puppeteer, and he wrote countless puppet plays and children's stories.

== Births ==
=== August ===
- August 17: Wilhelm Grube, German sinologist and ethnographer, (provided the German translations of a set of Chinese shadow play scripts), (d. 1908).

=== December ===
- December: R. E. O'Callaghan, English vegetarianism activist, lecturer and writer (O'Callaghan gained recognition for his effective lectures on vegetarianism, often enhanced with illustrations by using a magic lantern), (d. 1936).

=== Specific date unknown ===
- Jean de Paleologu, Romanian illustrator, painter, and poster artist, (created advertisements and publicity material for the American film industry and animation industry), (d. 1942).
- Henry Underhill, English artist, photographer, and amateur scientist, (co-founder and president of the Oxfordshire Natural History Society, gave lectures on a variety of scientific topics. All of his lectures were illustrated by his hand-painted and photographic magic lantern slides. He also illustrated folk tales from England, Russia, Japan and Ireland. The Folklore Society holds a collection of over 300 of Underhill's folk tale magic lantern slides), (d. 1920).

== Sources ==
- Salzburg Marionetten Theater. Salzburg, Austria: Salzburg Marionette Theater. 2004.
- The Bad Toelz Theatre Company (2001). "The History of the Bad Toelz Theatre Company". The Bad Toelz Theatre Company. Archived from the original on 30 March 2012.
