= 1905 in animation =

Events in 1905 in animation.

== Films released ==
- March 27 - How Jones Lost His Roll (United States), the first example of stop-motion animation in American film.
- May 31 - The Whole Dam Family and the Dam Dog (United States), early example of cutout animation

== Births ==
=== January ===
- January 14: Sterling Holloway, American actor (voice of Stork in Dumbo, adult Flower in Bambi, Cheshire Cat in Alice in Wonderland, the title character in the Disney's Winnie the Pooh franchise, Kaa in The Jungle Book, Roquefort in The Aristocats), (d. 1992).
- January 15: Allie Wrubel, American composer and songwriter (Song of the South, Make Mine Music, Melody Time), (d. 1973).
- January 17: Erdman Penner, Canadian screenwriter and producer (Cinderella, Sleeping Beauty, Lady and the Tramp), (d. 1956).
- January 26: Charles Lane, American actor (voice of Georges Hautecourt in The Aristocats), (d. 2007).

=== February ===
- February 8: Lev Atamanov, Armenian-Russian animator and film director (The Scarlet Flower, The Snow Queen, The Key), (d. 1981).
- February 18:
  - Darrell Calker, American composer (wrote music for Walter Lantz Cartoons), (d. 1964).
  - Queenie Leonard, English actress (voice of Bird in Tree in Alice in Wonderland, Princess in One Hundred and One Dalmatians), (d. 2002).

=== March ===
- March 10: Richard Haydn, British actor (voice of the Caterpillar in Alice in Wonderland), (d. 1985).
- March 23: Paul Grimault, French animator and film director (Le Roi et l'oiseau), (d. 1994).
- March 26: Larry Morey, American lyricist and screenwriter (Walt Disney Animation Studios), (d. 1971).
- March 31: Robert Stevenson, British-American screenwriter and film director (Mary Poppins, Bedknobs and Broomsticks), (d. 1986).

=== May ===
- May 3: Dick Kelsey, American film director and theme park designer (Walt Disney Company), (d. 1987).
- May 4: Mátyás Seiber, Hungarian-English composer (Animal Farm, A Short Vision), (d. 1960).
- May 5: Floyd Gottfredson, American cartoonist, apprentice animator and in-betweener (Walt Disney Animation Studios, Mickey Mouse comic strip), (d. 1986).

=== June ===
- June 5: John Abbott, English actor (voice of Akela in The Jungle Book), (d. 1996).
- June 14: Arthur Davis, American animator and film director (Charles B. Mintz, Warner Bros. Cartoons, Walter Lantz, Hanna-Barbera, DePatie-Freleng Enterprises), (d. 2000).
- June 16: Leslie Denison, English actor (voice of the judge and a weasel in The Adventures of Ichabod and Mr. Toad, narrator in Donald's Diary), (d. 1992).
- June 25: Mary Livingstone, American actress and comedienne (voiced herself in The Mouse That Jack Built), (d. 1983).

=== July ===
- July 8: Leonid Amalrik, Russian animator and animation director (Black and White, The Grey Neck, Thumbelina), (d. 1997).

=== August ===
- August 2: William Pomerance, American animator (Walt Disney Studios), (d. 1995).
- August 21: Friz Freleng, American animator and cartoonist (Looney Tunes, The Pink Panther), (d. 1995).
- August 29: Al Taliaferro, American comics artist and animator (Walt Disney Animation Studios, Donald Duck comic strip), (d. 1969).

=== September ===
- September 3: Eric Larson, American animator (Walt Disney Company), (d. 1988).
- September 12: Cornett Wood, American animator and lay-out artist (Walt Disney Company, Warner Bros. Cartoons), (d. 1980).
- September 18: Eddie "Rochester" Anderson, American comedian and actor (voiced himself in The Mouse that Jack Built, Bobby Joe Mason in Harlem Globetrotters and The New Scooby-Doo Movies), (d. 1977).

=== October ===
- October 7: Andy Devine, American actor (voice of Friar Tuck in Robin Hood), (d. 1977).
- October 10: Laverne Harding, American animator and comics artist (Walter Lantz, Hanna-Barbera, DePatie-Freleng, Looney Tunes, Filmation), (d. 1984).

=== November ===
- November 19:
  - Eleanor Audley, American actress (voice of Lady Tremaine in Cinderella and Maleficent in Sleeping Beauty), (d. 1991).
  - Roy Seawright, American special effects maker and animator (Babes in Toyland, One Million B.C.), (d. 1991).
- November 28: Mary Moder, American voice actress (voice of Fiddler Pig in Disney's Three Little Pigs shorts), (d. 1993).

=== December ===
- December 25: Ann Ronell, American composer and lyricist (co-wrote Who's Afraid of the Big Bad Wolf), (d. 1993).
