= Verena Ruegg =

American painter

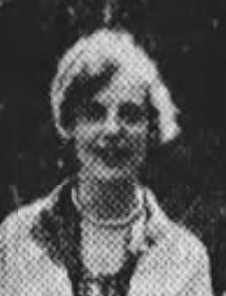
- Verena Ruegg, from a 1928 newspaper
- Born: April 30, 1895; San Francisco, California, U.S.
- Died: March 7, 1973 (aged 77); Los Angeles, California, U.S.
- Other names: Verena Robinson
- Occupation(s): Painter, animator, camerawoman

Verena Marie Ruegg (April 30, 1895 – March 7, 1973) was an American painter, animator, and camerawoman. Her work was part of the painting event in the art competition at the 1932 Summer Olympics. During World War II, she worked in animation at Disney and Warner Brothers studios.

== Early life and education ==
Ruegg was born in San Francisco, the daughter of Gallus Ruegg and Martina Vogt Ruegg. Her father was from Switzerland and her mother was from Austria. She attended Alfred University in New York, Mount Zion Hospital and Training School of Nursing in San Francisco, the Chouinard Art Institute and Otis Art Institute in Los Angeles.

== Career ==
Ruegg worked as a nurse as a young woman, and spent time as a patient at the Arequipa Sanatorium. She demonstrated pottery making at the 1915 Panama–Pacific International Exposition in San Diego, and did pottery work in Boston later in the 1910s.

Ruegg was best known for her paintings and "sparkling small sketches" of dancers and dance performances. Her work was included in the art competition at the 1932 Summer Olympics in Los Angeles, She earned prizes at the Los Angeles County Fair, and was featured at Corcoran Gallery, at the Los Angeles Museum in Exposition Park, and at other venues. She was a member of the California Art Club Association.

In widowhood, she worked in promotions at the Walt Disney Studios, and became an artist in the ink and paint department. By 1942 she had moved to the Leon Schlesinger studio to do similar work, and became a camerawoman in the animation process during World War II.

== Personal life and legacy ==
Ruegg married Canadian-born actors' agent Frederick J. Robinson in 1926. The Robinsons' Beverly Hills home burned down in 1939, and her husband died later that year. She died in 1973, in Los Angeles, at the age of 77. There is a collection of her papers, including sketches and drawings, in the special collections of the University of California, Irvine.
