= 1903 in animation =

Events in 1903 in animation.

== Events ==
- April 14 - The inventor Frederic Eugene Ives receives U.S. patent 725,567 for his "parallax stereogram", the first "no glasses" autostereoscopic 3-D display technology. It helps introduce the animation technique of barrier-grid animation and stereography. Ives' method is then modífied by Eugène Estanave to introduce a method of animated stereoscopic photography.

== Births ==
=== January ===
- January 7: Alan Napier, English actor (voice of Sir Pellinore in The Sword in the Stone, huntsman and reporter in Mary Poppins), (d. 1988).
- January 28: Sammy Lerner, Romanian songwriter (Popeye theme), (d. 1989).

=== February ===
- February 16: Edgar Bergen, American actor, comedian and puppeteer (narrator in the Mickey and the Beanstalk segment in Fun and Fancy Free), (d. 1978).
- February 18: George Givot, Russian-American comedian and actor (voice of Tony in Lady and the Tramp), (d. 1984).

=== May ===
- May 3: Bing Crosby, American singer and actor (narrator and voice of Ichabod Crane and Brom Bones in The Adventures of Ichabod and Mr. Toad), (d. 1977).
- May 21: Sammy Timberg, American musician and composer (Fleischer Studios, Famous Studios), (d. 1992).
- May 29: Bob Hope, English-American comedian, vaudevillian, actor, singer and dancer (voiced himself in The Simpsons episode "Lisa the Beauty Queen"), (d. 2003).

=== June ===
- June 17: Donald W. Graham, Canadian-American animator, artist and art instructor (Walt Disney Company), (d. 1976).
- June 21: Al Hirschfeld, American caricaturist, (artistic consultant for the "Rhapsody in Blue" segment in Fantasia 2000 which was inspired by his designs), (d. 2003).

=== July ===
- July 5: Vladimir Suteev, Russian children's writer, artist, animator, film director, and screenwriter (China in Flames, Petya and Little Red Riding Hood, The Magic Store), (d. 1993).
- July 7: Frank McSavage, Scottish-American comic artist and animator (Walt Disney Animation Studios, worked for Walter Lantz, Hanna-Barbera), (d. 1998).

=== August ===
- August 7: Rudolf Ising, American animator, film director and producer (co-founder of Warner Bros. Cartoons and the Metro-Goldwyn-Mayer cartoon studio, Looney Tunes, Merrie Melodies, Happy Harmonies) and actor (original voice of Barney Bear), (d. 1992).
- August 22: Jerry Iger, American animator (Fleischer Studios), and comics publisher, (d. 1990).
- August 31: Hugh Harman, American animator, (co-founder of Warner Bros. Cartoons and the Metro-Goldwyn-Mayer cartoon studio, Looney Tunes, Merrie Melodies, Happy Harmonies), (d. 1982).

=== September ===
- September 27: Robert O. Cook, American sound engineer (Walt Disney Animation Studios), (d. 1995).
- September 30: Pete Peterson, American stop motion animator and special effects artist (Mighty Joe Young, The Black Scorpion, The Giant Behemoth), (d. 1962).

=== October ===
- October 16: Hamilton Luske, American animator and director (Walt Disney Company), (d. 1968).

=== November ===
- November 7:
  - Georgy Millyar, Russian voice actor (voiced the Tsar in The Humpbacked Horse, Baba Yaga in The Frog Princess, and Koshchei in Beloved Beauty), (d. 1993).
  - Grace Stafford, American actress (voice of Woody Woodpecker from 1950 to 1991) and wife of Walter Lantz, (d. 1992).

=== December ===
- December 4: Lazar Lagin, Soviet science fiction writer, children's writer, satirist, and screenwriter (scripted Passion of Spies), (d. 1979).
- December 16: Hardie Albright, American actor (voice of adolescent Bambi in Bambi), (d. 1975).
