= 1915 in animation =

Events in 1915 in animation.

== Events ==
- William Randolph Hearst establishes the International Film Service, producing animated adaptations of comic strips running in his newspapers.

=== May ===
- The Animated Grouch Chasers, produced by Raoul Barré and Bill Nolan's studio, is released. It is notable as an early experiment in combining animation with live-action and for being one of the first animated series centering around one character.

== Films released ==
- 6 February – Colonel Heeza Liar, Ghost Breaker (United States)
- 20 February:
  - Colonel Heeza Liar In The Haunted Castle (United States)
  - The Police Dog No. 2 (United States)
- 20 March – Colonel Heeza Liar Runs The Blockade (United States)
- 27 March – The Police Dog No. 3 (United States)
- 3 April – Colonel Heeza Liar And The Torpedo (United States)
- 10 April – Colonel Heeza Liar And The Zeppelin (United States)
- 1 May – The Police Dog No. 4 (United States)
- 8 May – Colonel Heeza Liar Signs The Pledge (United States)
- 13 May – Colonel Heeza Liar In The Trenches (United States)
- 16 May – Colonel Heeza Liar at The Front (United States)
- 22 May – Colonel Heeza Liar, Aviator (United States)
- 5 June – Colonel Heeza Liar Invents A New King Of Shell (United States)
- 12 June – The Police Dog No. 5 (United States)
- 10 July – Colonel Heeza Liar, Dog Fancier (United States)
- 24 July – The Police Dog Gets Piffles In Bad (United States)
- 31 July – Colonel Heeza Liar Foils The Enemy (United States)
- 21 August – Colonel Heeza Liar, War Dog (United States)
- 4 September – Colonel Heeza Liar at The Bat (United States)
- 19 September – Pool Sharks (United States)
- 25 September – The Police Dog to the Rescue (United States)
- 12 October – Down on the Phoney Farm (United States)
- 28 December – Colonel Heeza Liar, Nature Faker (United States)

== Births ==
=== January ===
- January 21: Ray Erlenborn, American actor (voice of Rabbit in Winnie the Pooh Discovers the Seasons), and sound effects artist (Crusader Rabbit), (d. 2007).
- January 29: Bill Peet, American children's illustrator, writer and animator (Walt Disney Animation Studios), (d. 2002).

=== February ===
- February 2: Don Tobin, American animator and comics artist (Walt Disney Animation Studios), (d. 1995).
- February 19: Dick Emery, English comedian and actor (voice of Jeremy Hillary Boob, the Mayor of Pepperland and Max the Blue Meanie in Yellow Submarine), (d. 1983).
- February 28: Zero Mostel, American actor (voice of Kehaar in Watership Down), (d. 1977).

=== March ===
- March 6: Bonnie Poe, American voice actress (continued voice of Betty Boop), (d, 1993).
- March 17: Ben Washam, American animator (Warner Bros. Cartoons, Jay Ward), (d. 1984).

=== April ===
- April 10: Harry Morgan, American actor and director (voice of Carolinus in The Flight of Dragons, Bill Gannon in The Simpsons episode "Mother Simpson"), (d. 2011).
- April 16: Joan Alexander, American actress (voice of Lois Lane in Superman), (d. 2009).
- April 20: Aurora Miranda, Brazilian singer and actress (sang and danced with Donald Duck and José Carioca in The Three Caballeros), (d. 2005).

=== May ===
- May 1: Art Stevens, American animator and film director (Walt Disney Company), (d. 2007).
- May 5: Ben Wright, English actor (voice of Roger Radcliffe in 101 Dalmatians, Rama in The Jungle Book, Grimsby in The Little Mermaid), (d. 1989).
- May 6: Orson Welles, American theatre director, film director, and actor (narrator and voice of Nag and Chuchundra in Rikki-Tikki-Tavi, narrator in Bugs Bunny: Superstar, voice of Unicron in The Transformers: The Movie), (d. 1985).
- May 12: Tony Strobl, American animator and comics artist (Walt Disney Company, scriptwriter for DuckTales), (d. 1991).
- May 22:
  - Raymond Leblanc, Belgian comics publisher, and film producer (founder of Belvision) and director (Tintin and the Lake of Sharks), (d. 2008).
  - Torsten Bjarre, Swedish animator and comics artist, (d. 2001).
- May 26: Sam Edwards, American actor (voice of young Bambi in Bambi, voice of the title character in Rod Rocket), (d. 2004).

=== June ===
- June 2: Walter Tetley, American actor (voice of Felix the Cat, Andy Panda, Sherman in the Peabody segments of The Adventures of Rocky and Bullwinkle and Friends), (d. 1975).
- June 4: John N. Carey, American animator and comics artist (Warner Bros. Cartoons), (d. 1987).
- June 19: Pat Buttram, American actor (voice of Napoleon in The Aristocats, the Sheriff of Nottingham in Robin Hood, Luke in The Rescuers, Chief in The Fox and the Hound, Cactus Jake in Garfield and Friends), (d. 1994).

=== August ===
- August 16: Gloria Blondell, American actress (second voice of Daisy Duck), (d. 1986).
- August 22: Te Wei, Chinese comics artist and animator (The Proud General), (d. 2010).

=== September ===
- September 11: Carl Fallberg, American writer and cartoonist (Walt Disney Animation Studios, Hanna-Barbera, Warner Bros Cartoons), (d. 1996).

=== October ===
- October 24: Bob Kane, American comic book writer, animator and artist (co-creator of Batman, Cool McCool, and Courageous Cat and Minute Mouse), (d. 1998).

=== November ===
- November 11: Milicent Patrick, American actress, makeup artist, special effects designer and animator (Fantasia, Dumbo), (d. 1998).
- November 14:
  - Ken Hultgren, American animator and comics artist (Walt Disney Company, Mr. Magoo, The Archies), (d. 1968).
  - Martha Tilton, American singer (voice of Clarice in the Chip 'n' Dale, cartoon Two Chips and a Miss), (d. 2006).
- November 20: Kon Ichikawa, Japanese film director and animator (J.O. Studio), (d. 2008).
- November 23: John Dehner, American animator (Walt Disney Studios) and actor, (d. 1992).

=== December ===
- December 2: Mike Arens, American animator and comics artist (Walt Disney Company, Hanna-Barbera), (d. 1976).
- December 12: Frank Sinatra, American singer and actor (voice of Singing Sword in Who Framed Roger Rabbit), (d. 1998).
- December 22: Barbara Billingsley, American actress (voice of Nanny in Muppet Babies), (d. 2010).

=== Specific date unknown ===
- Jim Davis, American animator and cartoonist (Walt Disney Company, Fleischer Studios, Warner Bros. Cartoons, DePatie-Freleng, worked on Fritz the Cat), (d. 1996).
- Woody Gelman, American animator, comics artist, novelist and publisher (worked for Fleischer Studios and Famous Studios), (d. 1978).
