= 1856 in animation =

Events in 1856 in animation.

== Events ==
- Specific date unknown: Publication of Majama’ al-Bahrayn (1856) by al-Yaziji. It is a modern example of the maqama genre of picaresque short stories. The illustrations of the genre tend to share formal qualities with the art of shadow play. Shadow plays are considered a precursor to silhouette animation.

== Deaths ==
=== December ===
- December 24: John Ayrton Paris, British physician, (one of the claimed co-inventors of the animation device thaumatrope), dies at age 71.
