= George R. Tweedie =

English businessman and chemist

George R. Tweedie F. C. S.
- Born: George Richard Tweedie; 1857; Fulham, London, England
- Died: October, 17th, 1937 (aged 79–80); Hillborough, Kent, England
- Occupations: businessman, chemist
- Known for: Gossip about Ghosts

George R. Tweedie (1857–1937) was a businessman who gained fame in 1891 by running a popular magic lantern show, titled "Gossip about Ghosts". The show, which cost sixpence, consisted of fifty slides, each illustrating a story about ghosts or supernatural occurrences. One concerned George Villiers, 1st Duke of Buckingham, who supposedly appeared as a ghost to a king's officer to prevent the death of his son. Another touched upon the Legend of Hamilton Tighe, a murdered man who haunted his murderers in headless form.

The show was quite popular and received a positive review in the Pall Mall Gazette.

He later ran a second show, titled "Gossip about fairies".

Tweedie was formerly an instructor at the Royal Polytechnic Institution in London.
