= 1899 in animation =

Events in 1899 in animation.

== Events ==
- Specific date unknown:
  - French trick film pioneer Georges Méliès claimed to have invented the stop trick and popularized it by using it in many of his short films. He reportedly used stop-motion animation in 1899 to produce moving letterforms.
  - Earliest possible date for the production of Matches: an Appeal by the British film pioneer Arthur Melbourne-Cooper. Based on later reports by Melbourne-Cooper and by his daughter Audrey Wadowska, some believe that Cooper's Matches: an Appeal was produced in 1899 and was therefore the very first use of stop-motion animation. The extant black-and-white film shows a matchstick figure writing an appeal to donate a Guinea, for which Bryant & May would supply soldiers with sufficient matches. No archival records are known that could proof that the film was indeed created in 1899 during the beginning of the Second Boer War. Others place its creation at 1914, during the beginning of World War I. Cooper created more Animated Matches scenes in the same setting. These are believed to also have been produced in 1899, while a release date of 1908 has also been given.
  - The German toy manufacturer Gebrüder Bing introduced their toy "kinematograph", at a toy convention in Leipzig in November 1898. In late 1898 and early 1899, other toy manufacturers in Germany and France, including Ernst Plank, Georges Carette, and Lapierre, started selling similar devices. The toy cinematographs were basically traditional toy magic lanterns, adapted with one or two small spools that used standard "Edison perforation" 35mm film, a crank, and a shutter. These projectors were intended for the same type of "home entertainment" toy market that most of the manufacturers already provided with praxinoscopes and magic lanterns. Apart from relatively expensive live-action films, the manufacturers produced many cheaper films by printing lithographed drawings. These animations were probably made in black-and-white from around 1898 or 1899. The pictures were often traced from live-action films (much like the later rotoscoping technique). These very short films typically depicted a simple repetitive action and most were designed to be projected as a loop - playing endlessly with the film ends put together. The lithograph process and the loop format follow the tradition that was set by the stroboscopic disc, zoetrope and praxinoscope.
  - In the 1899 book Living Pictures, Henry V. Hopwood depicts and describes a simple four-phase animation device. Hopwood gave no name, date or any additional information for this toy that rotated when blown upon. It is thought to have been a version of the zoetrope.

== Births ==
=== January ===
- January 13: Louis de Rochemont, American filmmaker, (producer and artistic director for Animal Farm), (d. 1978).

=== February ===
- February 15: Lillian Disney, American ink artist (Walt Disney Animation Studios), and widow of Walt Disney, (d. 1997).

=== April ===
- April 2: William Garity, American inventor and audio engineer (Fantasound), (d. 1971).
- April 26: Guinn "Big Boy" Williams, American actor (narrator in Mr. Bug Goes to Town), (d. 1962).
- April 27: Walter Lantz, American animator, cartoonist, film director, and film producer (Walter Lantz Productions, Andy Panda, Woody Woodpecker, Chilly Willy, Oswald the Lucky Rabbit), (d. 1994).

=== May ===
- May 8: Arthur Q. Bryan, American comedian and actor (voice of Elmer Fudd in Looney Tunes), (d. 1959).
- May 10: Fred Astaire, American actor and singer (voice of S.D. Kluger in Santa Claus Is Comin' to Town and The Easter Bunny Is Comin' to Town), (d. 1987).
- May 31: Madge Blake, American actress (model for Fauna in Sleeping Beauty), (d. 1969).

=== June ===
- June 2: Lotte Reiniger, German film director, and animator, pioneer of silhouette animation, (The Adventures of Prince Achmed, the oldest surviving feature-length animated film, and devised an early version of the multiplane camera), (d. 1981).

=== August ===
- August 2: Valentina Semyonovna Brumberg, Russian animator, film director, and screenwriter (The Tale of Tsar Saltan, The Lost Letter, The Night Before Christmas, It Was I Who Drew the Little Man), (d. 1975).

=== September ===
- September 7: Perce Pearce, American animation director, producer, writer (Walt Disney Company) and actor (voice of the mole in Bambi), (d. 1955).

=== November ===
- November 4: Treg Brown, American motion picture sound editor (Warner Bros. Cartoons), (d. 1984).
- November 22: Hoagy Carmichael, American musician, composer, songwriter, actor and lawyer (voiced himself in The Flintstones episode "The Hit Song Writers"), (d. 1981).
