= 1897 in animation =

Events in 1897 in animation.

== Events ==
- Specific date unknown:
  - William Harbutt developed plasticine in 1897. To promote his educational "Plastic Method" he made a handbook that included several photographs that displayed various stages of creative projects. The images suggest phases of motion or change, but the book probably did not have a direct influence on claymation films. Still, the plasticine product would become the favourite product for clay animators, as it did not dry and harden (unlike normal clay) and was much more malleable than its harder and greasier Italian predecessor plasteline.
  - The first use of time-lapse photography in a feature film was in Georges Méliès' motion picture Carrefour De L'Opera (1897).
  - By 1897, German toy manufacturer Gebrüder Bing had a first prototype of their toy "kinematograph". It would later be used for traced pictures from live-action films (much like the later rotoscoping technique).

== Births ==
=== February ===
- February 24: Vyacheslav Levandovsky, Ukrainian animator, considered the founder of Ukrainian animation, (The Fairy Tale of the Straw Bull, The Tale about the Squirrel Hostess and the Mouse Villain, Tuk-Tuk and his friend Zhuk, In the Land of Dolls), (d. 1962).

=== March ===
- March 7: Cy Young, Chinese-American special effects animator (Walt Disney Company), (d. 1964).

=== May ===
- May 18: Frank Capra, Italian-born American director, producer and writer (creator of Private Snafu, directed Our Mr. Sun and Hemo the Magnificent), (d. 1991).

=== July ===
- July 11: Bernice Hansen, American voice actress, (voice of Tillie Tiger in Elmer Elephant, Petunia Pig, Cookie and Little Kitty in the Looney Tunes franchise, continued voice of Andy Panda and Oswald the Lucky Rabbit, provided squeaks for Mickey Mouse), (d. 1981).

=== September ===
- September 16: Milt Franklyn, American composer and arranger, (Looney Tunes), (d. 1962).

=== October ===
- October 23: Roberto Sgrilli, Italian painter, illustrator, comics artist and animator (Il Barone di Münchhausen, Anacleto e la Faina), (d. 1985).
- October 25: Luigi Pavese, Italian voice actor (provided the Italian voices of Colonel Hathi in The Jungle Book, Boris in Lady and the Tramp, and a Labrador Retriever in One Hundred and One Dalmatians), (d. 1969).

=== December ===
- December 5: Tina Lattanzi, Italian voice actress (provided the Italian voices of the Evil Queen in Snow White and the Seven Dwarfs, Lady Tremaine in Cinderella, the Queen of Hearts in Alice in Wonderland, and Maleficent in Sleeping Beauty), (d. 1997).
- December 9: Hermione Gingold, English actress (voice of Mme. Rubens-Chatte in Gay Purr-ee, Miss Squeek in Tubby the Tuba), (d. 1987).
