= Joseph-Charles d'Almeida =

French experimental physicist

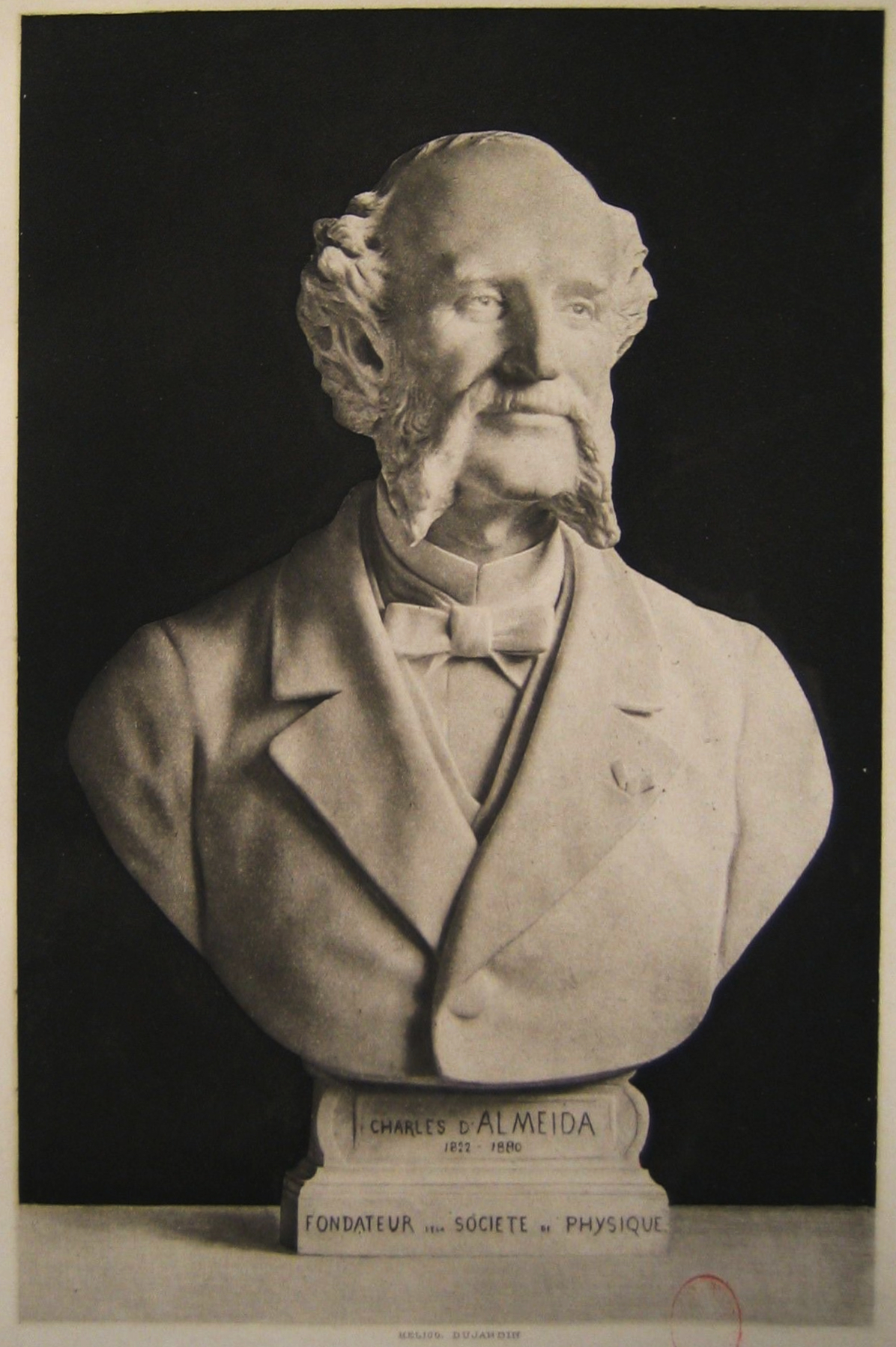
- Bust of d'Almeida by Eugène Guillaume
- Born: November 11, 1822; Paris, France
- Died: November 9, 1880 (aged 57); Paris, France
- Burial place: Montparnasse Cemetery
- Scientific career
- Fields: Experimental physics

Signature
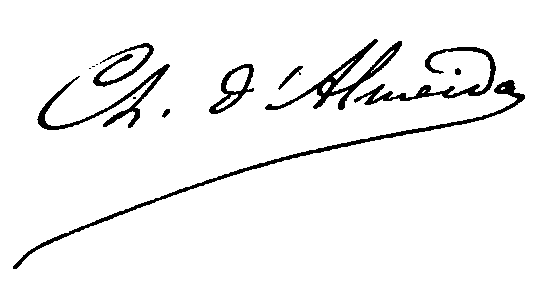

Joseph-Charles d'Almeida (November 11, 1822 – November 9, 1880) was a French experimental physicist who founded the Journal de physique in 1872 and the Société Française de Physique in 1873.

== Biography ==
D'Almeida was the son of Portuguese rentier Francisco de Almeida Portugal, later Count of Lavradio, under the Franconized name of Louise Joséphine Pierrette Miller who served as an advisor to the Portuguese embassy in Paris. He was a friend of François-René de Chateaubriand and Jean-Guillaume Hyde de Neuville.

D'Almeida studied first at a private school, the Pension de Reusse and then at the Lycée Saint-Louis and then at the Lycée Henri-IV. He wanted to join the École polytechnique but estrangement from his family led to changes in his plans. He became a preparator for the professor Pierre-Henry Blanchet from 1843 and in 1848 he became an associate professor of physics at the Lycée Corneille. D'Almeida became a naturalized French citizen in 1844. His license to teach physics ran into bureaucratic troubles due to his citizenship and a period of political turmoil. The Lycée d'Alger was established in Algeria and d'Almeida was recruited for it. In 1851 he was able to get help from Marcellin Berthelot who was a close friend and peer from college. Berthelot helped him find a position at the laboratory of Antoine-Jérôme Balard's in Paris. He received a doctorate for work on electrolysis. He gave lessons from 1853 to Nestor Gréhant in his apartment on rue Royer-Collard. He became an adjunct professor at the Lycée Henri-IV which was now known as the Lycée Napoléon. Along with Augustin Boutan, he authored a physics textbook for secondary schools which was first published in 1862.

D'Almeida met Jules Janssen in 1855 and became interested in spectra. He also took an interest in anaglyphs using magic lanterns projecting in two colours and viewing them through two coloured filters in 1858. In 1860 he worked on electrolysis of alcohol and nitric acid along with Pierre-Paul Dehérain. He visited Portugal and then the United States in 1862. He met William Douglas O'Connor, Rebecca Harding Davis, James Thomas Fields, Henry Longfellow, Ralph Waldo Emerson and Louis Agassiz. In 1869 he went with Antoine-Jérôme Balard, Marcellin Berthelot, Jules Jamin, Étienne-Jules Marey to the inauguration of the Suez Canal. In 1870 he took part in a balloon flight and he tried along with Jean-Gustave Bourbouze to use the Seine river as an electrical conduction with a view to allow telegraphic messages to be sent from Poissy to Desains. In 1872 he founded, along with Charles Brisse, Berthelot and Desains, the Journal de Physique. The next year, he was among the founders of the French Physical Society and served as its general secretary.

He died of a heart attack and was buried at the Montparnasse Cemetery in Paris. This was later moved to the Père-Lachaise ossuary. A bust by Eugène Guillaume was placed in the meeting room of the French Physical Society in 1881.

== Publications ==
- Décomposition par la pile des sels dissous dans l'eau, Martinet, 1856 — Thèse de doctorat.
- (with Augustin Boutan) Problèmes de physique, Dunod, 1862 — online quatrième édition (1874).
- (with Paul-Jean Coulier et Marcellin Berthelot), Vérification de l'aréomètre de Baumé, Gauthier-Villars, 1873.
- « Nouvel appareil stéréoscopique », Comptes rendus hebdomadaires des séances de l'Académie des sciences, 1858, t. XLVII, p. 61–63
- Cours élémentaire de physique suivi de problèmes, Dunod, 1874
- (with Augustin Boutan) Cours élémentaire de physique, précédé de notions de mécanique et suivi de problèmes, Dunod, 1863, 1867, 1884
- (with Augustin Boutan) Problèmes de physique, Dunod, 1862
- Thèse de physique, sur la décomposition par la pile des sels dissous dans l'eau, Martinet, 1856
- Rapport sur une mission confiée à Charles d'Almeida par le Gouvernement de la Défense nationale dont l'objet était d'établir des communications entre la Province et Paris lors de la Guerre de 1870-1871, Tours, Deslis Frères et Cie, 1913 .
- Journal de physique théorique et appliquée. A.(série 1), Bureau du journal de physique (Paris), 1872-1881. IRIS, bibliothèque numérique en histoire des sciences de l'université. Lille I.
