= 1892 in animation =

Events in 1892 in animation.

== Events ==
- October 11: Charles-Émile Reynaud signed a contract with the Musée Grévin, allowing him to start regular public screenings of his films at the museum. The first public screening took place on October 28. Reynaud received 500 francs (equivalent to €2,400 in 2025) per month and 10% of the box office. The contract disadvantaged Reynaud, as he paid for the maintenance of the system and was required to oversee all of the daily showings.
- Specific date unknown In 1892, mechanical engineer Thomas E. Bickle received British Patent No. 20,281 for a clockwork thaumatrope with "pictures or designs exhibiting some action or motion in two phases, which are thus alternately presented to the eye in rapid succession with small intervals of rest".

== Films released ==
- October 28:
  - Le Clown et ses chiens (The Clown and His Dogs).Film created by Charles-Émile Reynaud It consists of 300 individually painted images and lasts about 10 minutes.
  - Pauvre Pierrot (Poor Pete). Film created in 1891 by Charles-Émile Reynaud, but first exhibited to an audience in 1892 with Reynaud's Théâtre Optique at the Musée Grévin. The film consists of 500 individually painted images, and originally lasted for about 15 minutes.
  - Un bon bock (A Good Beer). Film created in 1888 by Charles-Émile Reynaud, but first exhibited to an audience in 1892 with Reynaud's Théâtre Optique at the Musée Grévin. It consisted of 700 individually painted 6 x 6 cm pictures in a 50 meter long flexible strip. Reynaud manipulated the speed and repeated movements by moving the film back and forth through the projector to tell a visual story that lasted close to fifteen minutes.

== Births ==
=== January ===
- January 31: Eddie Cantor, American actor, singer, songwriter and screenwriter (co-wrote Merrily We Roll Along for Merrie Melodies), (d. 1964).

=== March ===
- March 10: Gregory La Cava, American animator and film director (Raoul Barré, International Film Service), (d. 1952).

=== May ===
- May 2: Ōten Shimokawa, Japanese cartoonist, comics artist and animator (Imokawa Mukuzo Genkanban no Maki), (d. 1973).
- May 9: Nikolai Khodataev, Russian film director and animator (Interplanetary Revolution, China in Flames, One of Many, The Samoyed Boy, The Little Organ and Fialkin's Career), (d. 1979).

=== June ===
- June 13: Basil Rathbone, South African-British actor (narrator of "The Wind in the Willows" segment in The Adventures of Ichabod and Mr. Toad), (d. 1967).

=== July ===
- July 2: Jake Day, American artist, sculptor, photographer, naturalist and illustrator (Merbabies, The Milky Way, Bambi ), (d. 1983).
- July 30: Carl Koch, German art historian, film director, and writer (The Adventures of Prince Achmed), (d. 1963).

=== August ===
- August 2: Jack L. Warner, American film studio executive, co-founder and president of Warner Bros., (credited with the decision to sell the rights of all of the 400 cartoons which Warner Bros. made before 1948 for $3,000 apiece), (d. 1978).
- August 16: Otto Messmer, American animator (Felix the Cat), (d. 1983).
- August 29: Roland Crandall, American animator (Fleischer Studios), (d. 1972).
- August 31: Claire Du Brey, American actress (model of the Fairy Godmother in Cinderella), (d. 1993).

=== September ===
- September 11: Pinto Colvig, American clown, actor, and cartoonist (voice of Goofy and Pluto, Practical Pig in Three Little Pigs, Sleepy and Grumpy in Snow White and the Seven Dwarfs, Bluto in Popeye, Gabby in Gulliver's Travels, the title character in Conrad the Sailor), (d. 1967).

=== December ===
- December 26: Don Barclay, American actor and caricaturist (voice of the Doorman in Cinderella), (d. 1975).

== Death ==
=== July ===
- July 8: Cecil Shadbolt, British photographer (pioneered aerial photography from flying balloons; gave public lectures, using magic lantern slides, with the title Balloons and Ballooning, Upward and Onwards), dies at age 33.

== Sources ==
- Bendazzi, Giannalberto (1994). Cartoons: One hundred years of cinema animation. Indiana University Press. ISBN 0253209374.
- Myrent, Glenn (1989). "Emile Reynaud: First Motion Picture Cartoonist". Film History. 3 (3). Indiana University Press: 191–202. doi:10.2307/3814977. JSTOR 3814977.
- Rossell, Deac (1995). "A Chronology of Cinema, 1889-1896". Film History. 7 (2). Indiana University Press: 115–236. doi:10.2307/3815166. JSTOR 3815166.
- Thomas, Bob (1990). Clown Prince of Hollywood: The Antic Life and Times of Jack L. Warner. New York: McGraw-Hill Publishing Company. ISBN 0-07-064259-1
