= List of cinematic firsts =

List of the first achievements in cinema

This page lists chronologically the first achievements in cinema. The development of cinema is characterized by technological breakthroughs, from early experiments in the recording of day-to-day activity, experiments in color, different formats and sound. From the 1970s, the development of computer-generated imagery (CGI) became integral to the way that films are produced.

In parallel with the developments in technology, its content and the way it reflects society and its concerns and the way society responds to it have changed too. The list attempts to address some of these events.

== Pre-1826 ==
=== 1824 ===
- Peter Mark Roget wrote the article Explanation of an optical deception in the appearance of the spokes of a wheel when seen through vertical apertures which described a stroboscopic illusion.

== 1826–1875 ==
=== 1832 ===
- Almost simultaneously, around December 1832, the Belgian physicist Joseph Plateau and the Austrian professor of practical geometry Simon Stampfer invented the Phenakistiscope, the first practical device to create a fluid illusion of motion. Plateau introduced the device in January 1833 in a scientific magazine.

=== 1874 ===
- French astronomer P.J.C. Janssen came up with the idea for a "revolver to shoot the individual". This huge camera system used a Maltese cross-type mechanism, very similar to the system that would later be of great importance in the development of movie cameras. Janssen successfully captured two transits of Venus, the one of 1874 in Japan, and that of 1882 at Oran, in Algeria. Discs with test footage of a simulation from 1874 have been preserved and a modern animated version is sometimes regarded as the first movie.

== 1876–1925 ==
=== 1878 ===
- Using a battery of 12 cameras Eadweard Muybridge records several series of The Horse in Motion, capturing successive phases of movements that allowed his patron Leland Stanford to study the positions of the legs of his race horses during different gaits. The technique would soon be dubbed chronophotography.

=== 1880 ===
- During his lectures on locomotion, Eadweard Muybridge projected looping animations of The Horse in Motion with his Zoopraxiscope. The stroboscopic apparatus used glass discs on which silhouette versions of the photographs had been traced by an artist (with anamorphic corrections for the distortion caused by fast rotation).

=== 1882 ===
- Étienne-Jules Marey developed the Chronophotographe, which could take 12 pictures per second from a single viewpoint.

=== 1888 ===
- In Leeds, England Louis Le Prince films Roundhay Garden Scene, believed to be the first motion picture recorded.

=== 1889 or 1890 ===
- Monkeyshines was made by William Kennedy Dickson and William Heise as an experimental film to test the original cylinder Kinetograph format. The blurry result is believed to be the first film shot in the United States.

=== 1891 ===
- Dickson Greeting, by William Kennedy Dickson, was the first semi-public demonstration of cinematographic pictures in the United States. The National Federation of Women's Clubs were shown a 3-second clip of Dickson passing a hat in front of himself, and reaching for it with his other hand on May 20, 1891, at Edison's laboratory.

=== 1892 ===
- On October 28, 1892, Charles-Émile Reynaud gave the first public performance of a moving picture show at the Musée Grévin in Paris, the Théâtre Optique. The show, billed as Pantomimes Lumineuses, included three cartoons, Pauvre Pierrot, Un bon bock, and Le Clown et ses chiens, each consisting of 500 to 600 individually painted images and lasting about 15 minutes. The film was the first to use perforations.

=== 1893 ===
- Blacksmith Scene, by William Kennedy Dickson. The first Kinetoscope film shown in public exhibition on May 9, 1893, and is the earliest known example of actors performing a role in a film.
- The world's first film production studio, the Black Maria, or the Kinetographic Theater, was completed on the grounds of Edison's laboratories at West Orange, New Jersey, for the purpose of making film strips for the Kinetoscope. Construction began in December 1892.

=== 1894 ===
- On April 14, 1894, a public Kinetoscope parlor was opened by the Holland Bros. in New York City at 1155 Broadway, on the corner of 27th Street—the first commercial motion picture house. The venue had ten machines, set up in parallel rows of five, each showing a different film. For 25 cents, a viewer could see all the films in either row; half a dollar gave access to the entire bill.
- The Dolorita Passion Dance was banned in New Jersey after its use in peepshows. Russell Kick quotes the work Censorship as saying it "was probably the first [film] to be banned in the United States."
- La Sortie des Usines, the first film to be made in France.
- The Dickson Experimental Sound Film by William Kennedy Dickson. It is the first known film with live-recorded sound and appears to be the first motion picture made for the Kinetophone, the proto-sound-film system developed by Dickson and Thomas Edison.

=== 1895 ===
- First hand-colored film, Annabelle Serpentine Dance by William Kennedy Dickson.
- Charles Francis Jenkins displays the Phantascope, the first patented film projector.
- Incident at Clovelly Cottage by Robert W. Paul and Birt Acres is the first film to be made in the United Kingdom.
- L'Arroseur Arrosé, the first comedy film.
- The Execution of Mary Stuart, the first use of special effects in film.
- History of the Kinetograph, Kinetoscope, and Kinetophonograph by Antonia and William Kennedy Dickson, considered the first book of history on film, is published.

=== 1896 ===
- The first building dedicated exclusively to showing motion pictures was the Vitascope Hall, established on Canal Street, New Orleans, Louisiana, on June 26 — it was converted from a vacant store.
- Later that year on October 19, the Edisonia Hall opened in Buffalo, New York in the Ellicott Square Building. The Edisonia was the first known dedicated, purpose-built motion picture theater in the world.
- Alice Guy-Blaché, the first female film director makes La Fée aux Choux (The Cabbage Fairy) acknowledged as the first narrative fiction film. This movie also introduces screenplays for the first time.
- In The Kiss, May Irwin and John Rice re-enact the kiss from the New York stage hit The Widow Jones, the first film of a couple kissing.
- The House of the Devil, the first horror film.
- Le Coucher de la Mariée, a French erotic short film considered to be one of the first erotic films made. The film was first screened in Paris in November 1896, within a year of the first public screening of a projected motion picture.

=== 1899 ===
- King John is the first film adaptation of the work of William Shakespeare. The film features Herbert Beerbohm Tree in the title role and features the death scene from King John.

=== 1901 ===
- Histoire d'un crime, directed by Ferdinand Zecca was the first film to use flashbacks to create a non-linear narrative.
- The earliest known use of intertitles was in the British film Scrooge, or, Marley's Ghost.
- A Nymph of the Waves, the first experimental film.

=== 1902 ===
- Edward Raymond Turner's children and several other very short test films, the earliest known moving pictures photographed in color.
- A Trip to the Moon is the first sci-fi movie, as well as the first film to feature an extraterrestrial.

=== 1903 ===
- The Great Train Robbery, directed by Edwin S. Porter was the first western film.

=== 1904 ===
- The Great Train Robbery, directed by Siegmund Lubin was the first film remake.

=== 1906 ===
- Humorous Phases of Funny Faces directed by J. Stuart Blackton is the first animated film recorded on standard picture film.
- The Story of the Kelly Gang by Charles Tait is the first feature film to be released.

=== 1907 ===
- January 19, Variety publishes reviews of two films, An Exciting Honeymoon and The Life of a Cowboy by Edwin S. Porter. These are believed to be the first film reviews published.
- L'Enfant prodigue is the first feature film produced in Europe.

=== 1908 ===
- Fantasmagorie is considered the first animated cartoon.

=== 1909 ===
- The first full-length feature film produced in the United States was an adaptation of Victor Hugo's novel Les Misérables.
- The Kinemacolor process is first shown to the public at Palace Theatre in London. This is the first time the public saw color films.
- Wilbur Wright und seine Flugmaschine was the first film shot from an aeroplane. The flight took place in April 1909. Wilbur Wright was training military personnel and took a newsreel cameraman on a flight in Rome to record this.
- Albert Samama Chikly took the first underwater shot.

=== 1910 ===
- The German film serial, Arsène Lupin contra Sherlock Holmes directed by Viggo Larsen was the first film crossover.
- For the first time, the rights to adapt a novel are bought from a publisher, (Little, Brown & Company who published Helen Hunt Jackson's novel Ramona.) The film is made by D. W. Griffith.
- D. W. Griffith makes In Old California, the first film to be made in Hollywood.

=== 1912 ===
- With Our King and Queen Through India, a documentary recording Indian celebrations around the coronation of George V, is the first feature film to be released in color, using the Kinemacolor system.
- The dawn of Netta is the first movie distributed by a major studio.

=== 1914 ===
- Lois Weber directs The Merchant of Venice, making her the first American female director of a feature-length film.

=== 1915 ===
- The Birth of a Nation, directed by D. W. Griffith was the first big budget Hollywood epic.

=== 1916 ===
- The Fall of a Nation, directed by Thomas Dixon Jr. was the first feature-length film sequel.
- 20,000 Leagues Under the Sea is the first feature-length film adaptation of a Jules Verne work. Since its release, at least 56 subsequent feature-length adaptations have been made as of 2022.
- A Daughter of the Gods is the first film with a budget greater than $1,000,000.

=== 1917 ===
- The first animated feature film was El Apóstol by Quirino Cristiani from Argentina.
- The Gulf Between directed by Wray Physioc is the first feature film to use Technicolor.

=== 1918 ===
- Men Who Have Made Love to Me, directed by Arthur Berthelet was the first film to break the fourth wall.

=== 1920 ===
- The Cabinet of Dr. Caligari, the first movie to have a twist ending.

=== 1921 ===
- A Connecticut Yankee in King Arthur's Court (1921), directed by Emmett J. Flynn was the first film to feature time travel to the past.

=== 1922 ===
- On October 18, the first-ever Hollywood premiere was held at Grauman's Egyptian Theatre, for the release of Robin Hood.
- The first colour feature film made in Hollywood, The Toll of the Sea, starring Anna May Wong.
- First feature film in 3D. The Power of Love by Nat Deverich, which premiered at the Ambassador Hotel Theater in Los Angeles on September 27.
- Foolish Wives becomes the first film to cost $1 million to produce. The studio took advantage of its exorbitant price and advertised it as "The First Real Million Dollar Picture".

=== 1923 ===
- 16 mm film is introduced by Eastman Kodak in the United States.

=== 1925 ===
- The Big Parade, the first movie to swear.
- The Lost World, the first big-budget use of stop motion effects and rear screen projections.

== 1926–1975 ==
=== 1926 ===
- Don Juan becomes the first sound film, using the Vitaphone sound-on-disc system, though it contains no spoken dialogue.

=== 1927 ===
- The Jazz Singer starring Al Jolson is the first feature film with recorded dialogue, using the Vitaphone system.
- Napoleon by Abel Gance is the first film to be filmed in the widescreen format.
- To Build a Fire by Claude Autant-Lara is the first film shot in anamorphic format.

=== 1928 ===
- Lights of New York, directed by Bryan Foy is the first all talking feature film.
- Wings, directed by William A. Wellman is the first film to win the Academy Award for Best Picture.
- The Viking is the first feature-length film in color with sound (sound effects and music only).
- Steamboat Willie, the first cartoon with synchronized sound and the first cartoon to feature a fully post-produced soundtrack.
- In Old Arizona, the first major Western to use the new technology of sound and the first talkie to be filmed outdoors.
- The Air Circus becomes the first aviation-oriented film with dialogue as well as the first film to depict the barnstormer era.

=== 1929 ===
- The first Academy Award ceremony takes place at the Hollywood Roosevelt Hotel, Los Angeles, on May 1. Sunrise: A Song of Two Humans wins the award for "Unique and Artistic Production" (denoting artistic strength) and Wings wins the award for "Outstanding Picture, Production" (denoting technical production quality). Both awards were eliminated and merged the next year into the single Best Picture category. Emil Jannings and Janet Gaynor won the awards for best actor and actress, which were awarded for work in a number of different films throughout the year. Acting categories were later narrowed to honor work on a single film.
- Blackmail, directed by Alfred Hitchcock was the first British sound film.
- The Broadway Melody, first ever musical film. Also, the first sound film and first musical to win the Academy Award for Best Picture.
- Happy Days is the first feature film to be shown entirely in widescreen anywhere in the world. It was filmed using the Fox Grandeur 70 mm process.
- Glorifying the American Girl, the first film with sound to swear.

=== 1930 ===
- Fiddlesticks, directed by Ub Iwerks, was the first complete sound cartoon to be shot in two-strip Technicolor.
- Elstree Calling directed by Alfred Hitchcock was the first film to show a television set.
- Shadows of Glory becomes the first foreign-language sound film to be produced in the United States.
- Morocco becomes the first film to feature two women sharing a kiss on screen. The women were Marlene Dietrich and an uncredited actress.

=== 1931 ===
- Peludópolis, directed by Qirino Christiani, is the first animated feature with sound.
- The Police Patrol is the first feature film to be broadcast on television.

=== 1932 ===
- The first animated film to use the full, three-color Technicolor method was Flowers and Trees made by Walt Disney Studios. The film was also the first to win the Academy Award for Best Animated Short Film.
- Love Me Tonight by Rouben Mamoulian is credited as the first film to use a zoom lens.
- The Venice Film Festival runs from 6–21 August, the first film festival.
- White Zombie directed by Victor Halperin was the first zombie film.

=== 1933 ===
- The Crooked Circle was the first film to be broadcast on television, on March 10 in Los Angeles.
- Morgenrot was the first film to have its screening in Nazi Germany, and thus the first film of Nazi Cinema. Released three days after Adolf Hitler became Reichskanzler, the film became a symbol of the new times touted by the Nazi regime.

=== 1935 ===
- Becky Sharp, starring Miriam Hopkins, was the first feature-length film in three-strip Technicolor.

=== 1937 ===
- Disney's Snow White and the Seven Dwarfs was the first full-length cel-animated and Technicolor feature film.

=== 1940 ===
- First African-American to be nominated and to win the Academy Award for Best Supporting Actress: Hattie McDaniel (Gone with the Wind, 1939).
- Walt Disney's Fantasia is the first film with surround sound, using Disney's Fantasound system.

=== 1943 ===
- First twins to win the Academy Award for Best Adapted Screenplay: Julius and Philip Epstein, (Casablanca, 1942).

=== 1944 ===
- First feature film to feature a live-action and animated character on screen at the same time: The Three Caballeros.
- First feature film made for television broadcast: Talk Fast, Mister.

=== 1945 ===
- Momotaro: Sacred Sailors is the first feature-length anime film to be released
- Sanshiro Sugata Part II becomes the first numbered sequel.

=== 1946 ===
- The first Cannes Film Festival takes place from September 20 to October 5.

=== 1947 ===
- First feature film in 3D and partially in color: Robinson Crusoe by Alexander Andreyevsky.
- First feature film shot (almost) entirely from the POV of the main character: Lady in the Lake

=== 1948 ===
- First African-American man to receive an Academy Award: James Baskett (Academy Honorary Award for his portrayal of "Uncle Remus" in Song of the South, 1946) (See also: Sidney Poitier, 1964)
- The first British Academy Film Awards ceremony takes place with The Best Years of Our Lives, winning the award for best film.

=== 1951 ===
- Royal Journey is the first commercial feature film to be released in Eastmancolor, which would go on to become the dominant color process for over 50 years until it was surpassed in usage by digital color processing in 2013.
- Distant Drums is the first film to use the Wilhelm scream.

=== 1953 ===
- The Robe is the first film to be released in CinemaScope.

=== 1954 ===
- Sesto Continente, directed by Folco Quilici, was the first full-length, full-color underwater documentary. The much more famous The Silent World, released in 1956, is frequently erroneously claimed as such.
- Dragnet is the first theatrical film based on a television series.

=== 1955 ===
- Disney's Lady and the Tramp is the first feature-length animated film to be released in a widescreen format, after it is released in CinemaScope. This was after Disney released the Academy Award-winning short film, Toot, Whistle, Plunk and Boom, in the same format two years prior.
- A Generation is the first film to use a squib.
- Famous Film Festival is network television's first feature movie anthology television series.

=== 1956 ===
- Forbidden Planet is the first science fiction film to depict humans traveling in a faster-than-light starship of their own creation, the first to be set entirely on another planet in interstellar space, far away from Earth, as well as the first film to use an entirely electronic musical score, which was courtesy of Bebe and Louis Barron.
- The Wizard of Oz becomes the first feature-length film to be broadcast in its entirety on network television. According to the U.S. Library of Congress, this greatly contributed it to it having "been seen by more viewers than any other movie."

=== 1958 ===
- The White Snake Enchantress is the first feature-length anime film to be made in color.
- Vertigo is the first film to use a dolly zoom.

=== 1959 ===
- Sleeping Beauty's score becomes the first true-stereo soundtrack. It was recorded with the Graunke Symphony Orchestra from September 8 to November 25, 1958.

=== 1960 ===
- Psycho is the first film to show a flushing toilet.

=== 1961 ===
- NBC Saturday Night at the Movies, the first regularly scheduled feature movie anthology network television series to broadcast recently released feature films in color, debuts.
- Magic Boy becomes the first anime film to be released in the United States on June 22, 1961.

=== 1962 ===
- The Manchurian Candidate was the first Hollywood film to cast a black actor in a role not specifically written as black.
- Mutiny on the Bounty was the first motion picture filmed in the Ultra Panavision 70 widescreen process.

=== 1963 ===
- The Cardinal was the first film to be shown in 70mm despite being filmed on 35mm filmstock. However, there is some disagreement over whether Taras Bulba, which was released a year prior, was shown using this process before the premiere of The Cardinal.

=== 1964 ===
- First movie with African-American interracial marriage: One Potato, Two Potato, actors Bernie Hamilton and Barbara Barrie, written by Orville H. Hampton, Raphael Hayes, directed by Larry Peerce
- First African-American man to win the Academy Award for Best Actor: Sidney Poitier (Lilies of the Field, 1963) (See also: James Baskett, 1948)
- First feature film made for network television: See How They Run.
- Richard Burton's Hamlet was the first stageplay recorded on tape (Electronovision) and given a theatrical release.
- Hey There, It's Yogi Bear! is the first feature-length animated film based on a TV series and the first theatrical feature produced by Hanna-Barbera.

=== 1965 ===
- Harlow first feature film shot on video at the lower range of modern high definition. It used Electronovision, an American film production process based on the French 819 lines TV system, which could display 737 active lines on screen, so slightly above 720p (albeit as a B&W, interlaced, 4/3 format). Videotape was transferred to 35 mm film for distribution.

=== 1966 ===
- The Silencers becomes the first film to feature a post-credits scene. The film, which is a spoof of James Bond, sought to parody the post-credits motif of James Bond films, which include some variation of "James Bond will return" after the credits.

=== 1969 ===
- The Learning Tree was the first film directed by an African-American person, Gordon Parks, for a major American film studio, in this case Warner Bros.-Seven Arts.

=== 1970 ===
- M*A*S*H is the first mainstream film to use the expletive fuck.
- Tiger Child, the first film in the IMAX format is made. Directed by Donald Brittain and produced by Roman Kroitor and Kichi Ichikawa, it debuted at Expo '70 in Osaka, Japan at the Fuji Group Pavilion.
- Midnight Cowboy wins the Academy Award for Best Picture, making it the only X-rated movie to win the award.

=== 1971 ===
- 200 Motels was the first theatrical release to be shot on color videotape and transferred to 35mm film.
- The first permanent shush theater, Cinesphere is built on the grounds of Ontario Place in Toronto, Ontario, Canada.
- A Clockwork Orange, first film to be released with Dolby Sound Reduction audio system.

=== 1972 ===
- A Computer Animated Hand, the first movie that used some advanced CGI techniques.
- Cheongchun gyosa, the first movie commercially released on VHS.
- Fritz the Cat, the first American animated feature to be given an X rating.

=== 1973 ===
- First use of 2D computer animation in a significant entertainment feature film, Westworld. The point of view of Yul Brynner's gunslinger was achieved with raster graphics.

=== 1974 ===
- The Man with the Golden Gun becomes the first film to feature an "astro-spiral" jump, in which a car drives up a corkscrewed ramp and turns 360 degrees along its long axis. The stunt was performed with a AMC Hornet X hatchback by Loren "Bumps" Willert, and was done across a river near Bangkok, Thailand.

=== 1975 ===
- Jaws becomes the first film to gross more than $100 million at the American box office.
- Lisztomania becomes the first film to use the new Dolby Stereo sound system.
- Barry Lyndon was the first film with scenes shot entirely by natural candlelight.

== 1976–2025 ==
=== 1976 ===
- Steadicam is used for the first time in a production: Hal Ashby's Bound for Glory, however, John Schlesinger's Marathon Man, released the same year is the first to be commercially released.
- The Young Teacher is the first feature film released on VHS.

=== 1977 ===
- Star Wars by George Lucas became the first film to gross $200 million at the American box office.

=== 1978 ===
- Watership Down is the first animated film to be presented in Dolby Stereo.
- Jaws is the first feature film released on LaserDisc.

=== 1980 ===
- The Shining by Stanley Kubrick is the first film to use a steadicam in "low mode".

=== 1981 ===
- Looker is the first film to feature a CGI human character, Cindy. Also, first use of 3D shaded CGI.

=== 1982 ===
- Star Wars became the first film to gross $500 million at the worldwide box office.
- For Star Trek II: The Wrath of Khan, Industrial Light & Magic (ILM) computer graphics division develops "Genesis Effect", the first use of fractal-generated landscape in a film. Bill Reeves leads the Genesis Effect programming team, and creates a new graphics technique called Particle Systems.

=== 1983 ===
- Rock & Rule is the first animated film to use computer graphics.
- The Terry Fox Story was the first television film ever made for a cable network.

=== 1984 ===
- The Last Starfighter uses CGI for all spaceship shots, replacing traditional models. First use of 'integrated CGI' where the effects are supposed to represent real-world objects.
- The Sensorium is regarded the world's first 4D film.
- Invasion of the Body Snatchers becomes the first film to receive a home video release in its original aspect ratio, when The Criterion Collection releases it as Laserdisc Spine #008. The practice would go on to become the industry-wide standard for future home video releases.

=== 1985 ===
- E.T. the Extra-Terrestrial by Steven Spielberg became the first film to gross more than $400 million at the American box office.
- In Young Sherlock Holmes, Lucasfilm creates the first photorealistic CGI character, 'stained glass knight', with 10 seconds of screentime.

=== 1986 ===
- At the Canada Pavilion in Expo 86, Vancouver, Canada the first showing in IMAX 3D takes place (Transition).

=== 1987 ===
- Julia and Julia (Giulia e Giulia): first feature film shot in analog HDTV with a resolution in the 1000+ lines range (Japanese 1125 lines Hi-Vision system, with 1035 active lines). Transferred to 35 mm for distribution.

=== 1988 ===
- Tin Toy by John Lasseter becomes the first computer-animated short film to win an Academy Award.

=== 1990 ===
- The Rescuers Down Under is both Walt Disney Animation Studios' first theatrical sequel and Hollywood's first feature film digitally colored and assembled entirely on computers, using the studio's proprietary Computer Animation Production System (C.A.P.S.).

=== 1991 ===
- Beauty and the Beast is the first animated film to have an Academy Award nomination for Best Picture.
- The Silence of the Lambs becomes the first and only horror film to win the Academy Award for Best Picture.

=== 1992 ===
- Aladdin by John Musker and Ron Clements became the first animated film to gross more than $500 million worldwide.
- Batman Returns is the first film to be released with Dolby Stereo Digital (now known as Dolby Digital). This came after a limited experimental release of Star Trek VI: The Undiscovered Country played in three US theatres in 1991.

=== 1993 ===
- Wax or the Discovery of Television Among the Bees, originally released in 1991, is the first film to be streamed on the Internet.
- Du fond du coeur is the first feature film to be shot on European 1250 lines (1152 active) HDTV format, at least partially, due to technical problems during shooting. Du fond du coeur (1994) was more successful in this regard, but, though finalized on 35 mm film, was intended as a TV series rather than for theatrical release.
- Jurassic Park by Steven Spielberg became the first film to gross more than $900 million worldwide.
- Super Mario Bros. is the first live-action film adaptation to be based on a video game.

=== 1994 ===
- True Lies by James Cameron is the first film to cost $100 million. Later, such budgets would become much more commonplace. As of January 2024, at least 500 films have been made with a budget of $100 million or more.

=== 1995 ===
- Toy Story by John Lasseter is the first feature film to be made entirely using CGI.
- Casper, the first CGI lead character in feature-length film (preceded Toy Story by six months).
- Party Girl is the first film to debut on the internet on June 3, 1995.
- The LaserDisc version of Clear and Present Danger featured the first home theater Dolby Digital sound mix. It was quickly followed by True Lies, Stargate, Forrest Gump, and Interview with the Vampire among others.

=== 1996 ===
- The Hunchback of Notre Dame is the first animated film to cost at least $100 million.
- The English Patient is the first digitally edited film to win the Academy Award for Best Editing.

=== 1997 ===
- Titanic by James Cameron becomes the first film to cost $200 million and to earn more than $1 billion worldwide.
- Twister by Jan de Bont, the first film to be commercially available on the DVD format in the United States.

=== 2000 ===
- First digital cinema projection in Europe by Philippe Binant with DLP Cinema technology for the release of Toy Story 2.
- O Brother, Where Art Thou? by the Coen brothers is the first feature film to be entirely color corrected by digital means.
- Fantasia 2000 is the first animated feature-length film shown in IMAX. The success of the release, as well as IMAX corporation's struggle with layoffs and closures, led to the creation of IMAX DMR process, which up-converts conventional films to IMAX format.
- Our Lady of the Assassins was shot on progressive digital HDTV, though at a 30 fps framerate. Transferred to 35 mm for release.

=== 2001 ===
- Final Fantasy: The Spirits Within is the first feature film to use motion-capture to create characters.
- Shrek was the first feature film to win an Academy Award for Best Animated Feature.
- Spirited Away was the first anime to win an Academy Award (Academy Award for Best Animated Feature). It is also the first hand-drawn and foreign film to win in the category.
- Vidocq: first film shot in digital progressive HDTV at standard 24 fps cinematic framerate.

=== 2002 ===
- Russian Ark by Alexander Sokurov is the first feature film to be shot entirely in uncompressed high definition video. It is also the first feature film to consist of a single unedited take.
- The Collingswood Story is the first screenlife film
- Apollo 13 is the first film to experience IMAX DMR process, which up-converts conventional films to IMAX format.
- Star Wars: Episode II – Attack of the Clones is the first Hollywood blockbuster shot entirely on digital video.

=== 2003 ===
- The Matrix Revolutions is the first film to be released in IMAX on the same day as its conventional film release, after undergoing their proprietary DMR process.

=== 2004 ===
- Shrek 2 is the first animated film to gross more than $400 million domestically and $900 million worldwide.
- Able Edwards, the first movie with all-CGI backgrounds and live actors.
- The Polar Express by Robert Zemeckis, the first film to entirely use the motion-capture technique, whereby the physical movements of the actors are digitally recorded and then translated into a computer animation.

=== 2006 ===
- X-Men: The Last Stand, the first movie to feature De-aged actors, specifically Ian McKellen and Patrick Stewart.
- Ode to Joy, the first European movie to have its premiere simultaneously in theaters and online as VOD through national Polish television site www.itvp.pl.

=== 2007 ===
- The original 65 mm negative of Baraka is scanned in 8K resolution, becoming the first film to do so.

=== 2008 ===
- U2 3D was the first live-action film to be shot, posted, and exhibited entirely in 3D, the first live-action digital 3D film, and the first 3D concert film. Regarding its production, it was the first 3D film shot using a zoom lens, an aerial camera, and a multiple-camera setup. Additionally, it was the first 3D film to feature composite images with more than two layers, and the first to be edited specifically to prevent the viewer from experiencing motion sickness or eye strain.
- The Dark Knight is the first mainstream feature to be partially shot with IMAX 70mm cameras, with 30 minutes of footage.

=== 2009 ===
- Monsters vs. Aliens by Conrad Vernon and Rob Letterman, the first CGI-animated film to be directly produced in the stereoscopic 3D format instead of being converted into 3D after completion. Although Up by Pete Docter had accomplished the same feat and had finished being directly produced in the stereoscopic 3D format earlier, Monsters vs. Aliens was released first, on March 20.
- Priyanka Chopra becomes the first actor to portray at least twelve characters in a film, when she stars in What's Your Raashee?.
- Slumdog Millionaire is the first Academy Award for Best Cinematography winner shot mainly on digital video.
- Avatar by James Cameron is the first 3D film to be the highest-grossing film of all time, surpassing the 2D ones. It is also the first winner of the Academy Award for Best Cinematography shot entirely on digital video.

=== 2010 ===
- Toy Story 3 is the first CGI-animated film to cost at least $200 million. It is also the first animated film to gross over a $1 billion.

=== 2011 ===
- The Artist is the first film financed entirely outside the United States and United Kingdom to win the Academy Award for Best Picture.
- Searching For Sonny is the first feature film shot entirely on a DSLR.
- Olive is the first feature film shot entirely on a cell phone.

=== 2012 ===
- The Hobbit: An Unexpected Journey is the first wide-release film to be shot using a high frame rate. Cinematographer Andrew Lesnie shot the film using 48 frames per second, twice the usual 24 frames per second. However, few cinemas were capable of showing the high frame rate version of the film - at most 1,000 screens out of the 39,056 showing it in the United States - and most showed it in the ordinary frame rate. The reason for this increased frame rate was to make the 3D easier to watch, remove camera blur, and increase clarity.
- Brave by Mark Andrews and Brenda Chapman, is the first film to make use of the Dolby Atmos surround sound format.
- Frankenweenie becomes the first black-and-white film and the first stop-motion animated film to be released in IMAX.

=== 2013 ===
- Skyfall is the first film to gross over £100 million in the United Kingdom.
- The Wolf of Wall Street by Martin Scorsese, becomes the first major American movie to be delivered to theaters in digital formats only.
- Stalingrad is the first Russian film to be released in IMAX.
- Hooked Up by Pablo Larcuen is the first commercially released film to be shot on a smartphone, in this case an iPhone 4s.

=== 2014 ===
- The Hobbit: The Battle of the Five Armies is the first mainstream feature to be released in IMAX with Laser.

=== 2015 ===
- Hits becomes the first feature-length film to be released on BitTorrent with a pay-what-you-want model.

=== 2016 ===
- On February 14, the first films are released on the Ultra HD Blu-ray format, with The Amazing Spider-Man 2, Salt, Hancock, Chappie, Pineapple Express, and The Smurfs 2 being the first to be released, among others.

=== 2017 ===
- Guardians of the Galaxy Vol. 2 is the first film to be shot in 8K resolution. It was shot with the Red Weapon 8K camera.

=== 2018 ===
- Avengers: Infinity War is the first Hollywood feature film to be entirely shot with Arri Alexa IMAX cameras equipped with Panavision Sphero 65 & Ultra Panavision 70 lenses.

=== 2019 ===
- The Lion King by Jon Favreau, is the first photorealistic animated film.

=== 2020 ===
- Parasite by Bong Joon-ho, becomes the first film not in the English language to win the Academy Award for Best Picture at the 92nd Academy Awards ceremony.
- The Midnight Sky by George Clooney, the first feature film to utilize Industrial Light & Magic's StageCraft virtual production technology.
- Nomadland by Chloé Zhao, the first Academy Award-winning film to be released theatrically, direct-to-streaming, and VOD at the same time.

=== 2021 ===
- The Suicide Squad is the first non-Marvel Studios film ever released to be shot entirely with IMAX-certified digital cameras. Although Top Gun: Maverick and Dune had both accomplished the same feat and had finished filming earlier, The Suicide Squad was released first, on August 5, after the releases of the other two were delayed due to the COVID-19 pandemic. The film was shot with the Red Ranger Monstro 8K & Komodo 6K cameras. The film was also the first feature film to use the Red Komodo camera.
- The Tomorrow War is the first streaming original film to cost at least $200 million to produce. The film was originally set for theatrical release by Paramount Pictures, but the film's distribution rights were ultimately acquired by Amazon due to the COVID-19 pandemic, Four months later, Red Notice was also released under similar circumstances and cost, on Netflix.

=== 2022 ===
- CODA becomes both the first film distributed by a streaming service and the first film debuted at the Sundance Film Festival to win Best Picture at the 94th Academy Awards ceremony.
- The Gray Man becomes the first streaming original to cost at least $200 million that was originally intended as a streaming original.

=== 2023 ===
- Oppenheimer by Christopher Nolan is the first film to shoot sections in IMAX black and white analog photography.
- The Creator by Gareth Edwards is the first large-budget major studio film to be shot on the prosumer Sony FX3 camera, the low cost of which is a rarity for a blockbuster film.

== 2026–present ==
=== 2026 ===
- The Odyssey by Christopher Nolan is the first narrative feature film to be shot entirely in IMAX 70mm.
- Wildwood becomes the first stop motion animated film to exceed two hours. The 131-minute-long film became the longest stop-motion film ever made, beating the previous, 117 minute record holder, Guillermo del Toro's Pinocchio.

== See also ==
- History of film technology
- List of directorial debuts
- Timeline of computer animation in film and television

== Bibliography ==
- Netzley, Patricia D. Encyclopedia of Movie Special Effects. Checkmark Books, 2001.
