= Film =

Visual art consisting of moving images

A Trip to the Moon (1902) is considered to be a turning point in the development of narrative and science fiction films.

A film, movie, or motion picture (Note: Various other nicknames exist including a picture, photoplay, or flick.) is a work of visual art that simulates experiences and otherwise communicates ideas, stories, perceptions, emotions, or atmosphere through the use of moving images that are generally, since the 1930s, synchronized with sound and sometimes feature other sensory stimuli.

Films are produced by recording people and objects with cameras or by creating them using animation techniques and special effects. They comprise a series of individual frames, but when these images are shown rapidly in succession, the illusion of motion is seen by the viewer. Flickering between frames is not noticeable due to an effect traditionally known as persistence of vision, and now more specifically known as flicker fusion, whereby the visual system processes a sufficiently fast succession of pictures and interruptions into a steady image of averaged brightness.

Films are widely considered to be an important art form; films entertain, educate, enlighten, and inspire audiences. The visual elements of cinema need no translation, giving the motion picture a universal power of communication. Any film can become a worldwide attraction, especially with the addition of dubbing or subtitles that translate the dialogue. Films are also artifacts created by specific cultures, which reflect those cultures, and, in turn, affect them.

== History ==
=== Precursors ===
The art of film has drawn on several earlier traditions in fields such as oral storytelling, literature, theatre, and visual arts. Forms of art and entertainment that had already featured moving or projected images include shadowgraphy, camera obscura, shadow puppetry, and magic lantern.

=== 1830s–1880s: Before celluloid ===
Animated GIF of Prof. Stampfer's Stroboscopische Scheibe No. X (Trentsensky & Vieweg 1833)

The stroboscopic animation principle was introduced in 1833 with the stroboscopic disc (better known as the phénakisticope) and later applied in the zoetrope (since 1866), the flip book (since 1868), and the praxinoscope (since 1877), before it became the basic principle for cinematography.

Experiments with early phénakisticope-based animation projectors were made at least as early as 1843 and publicly screened in 1847. Jules Duboscq introduced phénakisticope projection systems in France in the 1870s.

Photography was introduced in 1839, but initially photographic emulsions needed such long exposures that the recording of moving subjects seemed impossible. At least as early as 1844, photographic series of subjects posed in different positions were created to either suggest a motion sequence or document a range of different viewing angles. The advent of stereoscopic photography, with early experiments in the 1840s and commercial success since the early 1850s, raised interest in completing the photographic medium with the addition of means to capture color and motion. In 1849, Joseph Plateau published the idea to combine his invention of the phénakisticope with the stereoscope, as suggested to him by stereoscope inventor Charles Wheatstone, and to use photographs of plaster sculptures in different positions to be animated in the combined device. In 1852, Jules Duboscq patented such an instrument as the "Stéréoscope-fantascope, ou Bïoscope", but he only marketed it very briefly, without success. One Bïoscope disc with stereoscopic photographs of a machine is in the Plateau collection of Ghent University, but no instruments or other discs have yet been found.

An animation of the retouched Sallie Garner card from The Horse in Motion series (1878–1879) by Muybridge

In the late 1840s, the first examples of instantaneous photography came about. This provided hope that motion photography would soon be possible, but it took a few decades before it was successfully combined with a method to record series of sequential images in real-time. In 1878, Eadweard Muybridge managed to take a series of photographs of a running horse with a battery of cameras in a line along the track and published the results as The Horse in Motion on cabinet cards. Muybridge, as well as Étienne-Jules Marey, Ottomar Anschütz, and others, would create many more chronophotography studies. Muybridge had the contours of dozens of his chronophotographic series traced onto glass discs and projected them with his zoopraxiscope in his lectures from 1880 to 1895.

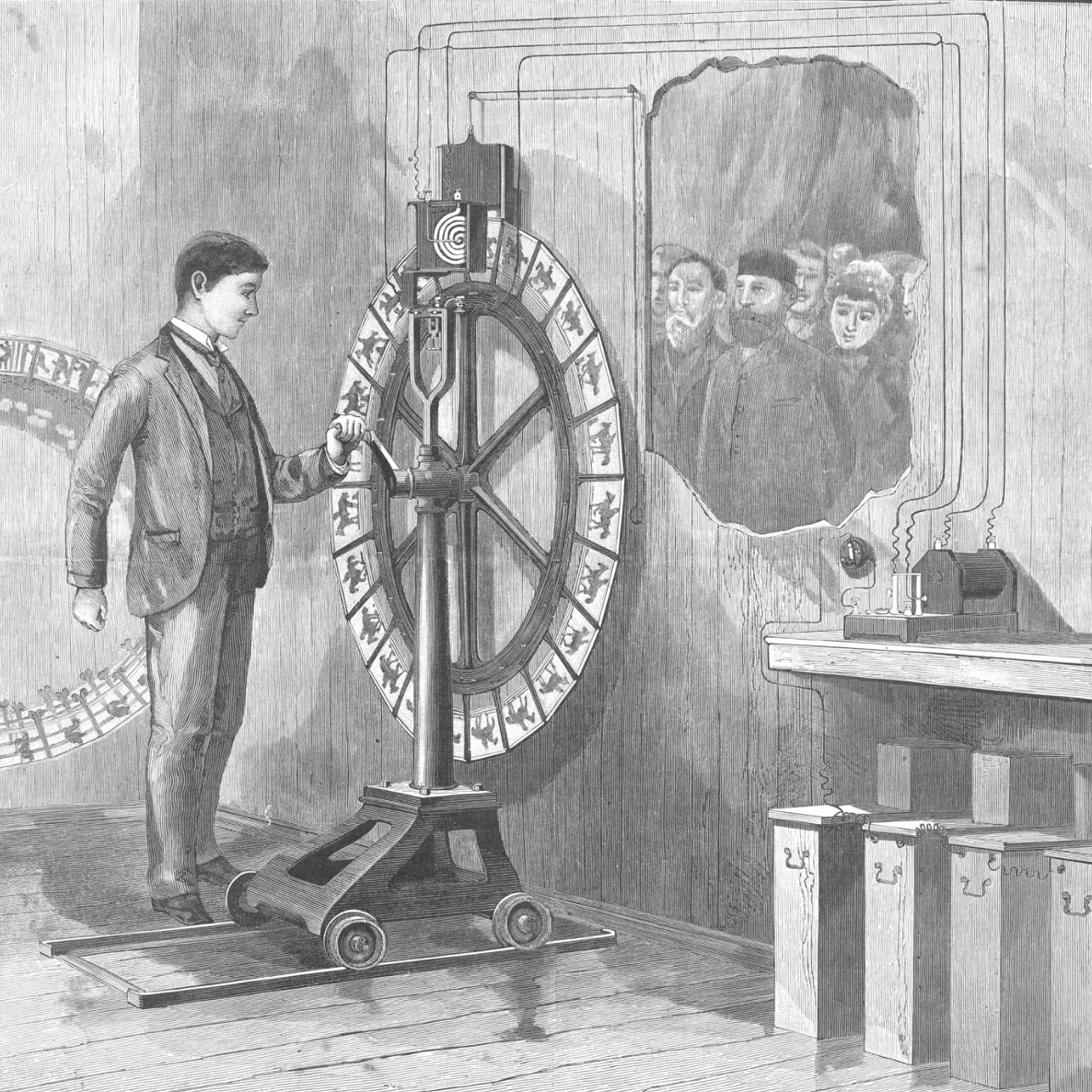
An Anschütz electrotachyscope American Scientific, 16/11/1889, p. 303

Anschütz made his first instantaneous photographs in the early 1880s, developing a portable camera that allowed shutter speeds as short as 1/1000 of a second. The quality of his pictures was generally regarded as much higher than that of the chronophotography works of Muybridge and Marey. In 1886, Anschütz developed the Electrotachyscope, an early device that displayed short motion picture loops with 24 glass plate photographs on a 1.5 meter wide rotating wheel that was hand-cranked to a speed of circa 30 frames per second. Different versions were shown at many international exhibitions, fairs, conventions, and arcades from 1887 until at least 1894. Starting in 1891, some 152 examples of a coin-operated peep-box Electrotachyscope model were manufactured by Siemens & Halske in Berlin and sold internationally. Nearly 34,000 people paid to see it at the Berlin Exhibition Park in the summer of 1892. Others saw it in London or at the 1893 Chicago World's Fair. On 25 November 1894, Anschütz introduced a Electrotachyscope projector with a 6x8 meter screening in Berlin. Between 22 February and 30 March 1895, a total of circa 7,000 paying customers came to view a 1.5-hour show of some 40 scenes at a 300-seat hall in the old Reichstag building in Berlin.

Pauvre Pierrot (1892) repainted clip

French inventor Émile Reynaud had already mentioned the possibility of projecting images of the Praxinoscope in his 1877 patent application. He presented a praxinoscope projection device at the Société française de photographie in 1880, but did not commercially produce his praxinoscope a projection before 1882. It received an Honourable Mention at the Paris Exposition of 1878. He then further developed the device into the Théâtre Optique, which could project longer sequences with separate backgrounds, patented in 1888. He created several movies for the machine by painting images on gelatin plates that were mounted into cardboard frames and attached to a cloth band. From 1892 to 1900, Reynaud presented animated shows, called Pantomimes Lumineuses, to visitors at the Musée Grévin in Paris.

=== 1880s–1890s: First motion pictures ===
Roundhay Garden Scene, the world's earliest surviving film produced using a motion picture camera, by Louis Le Prince, 1888

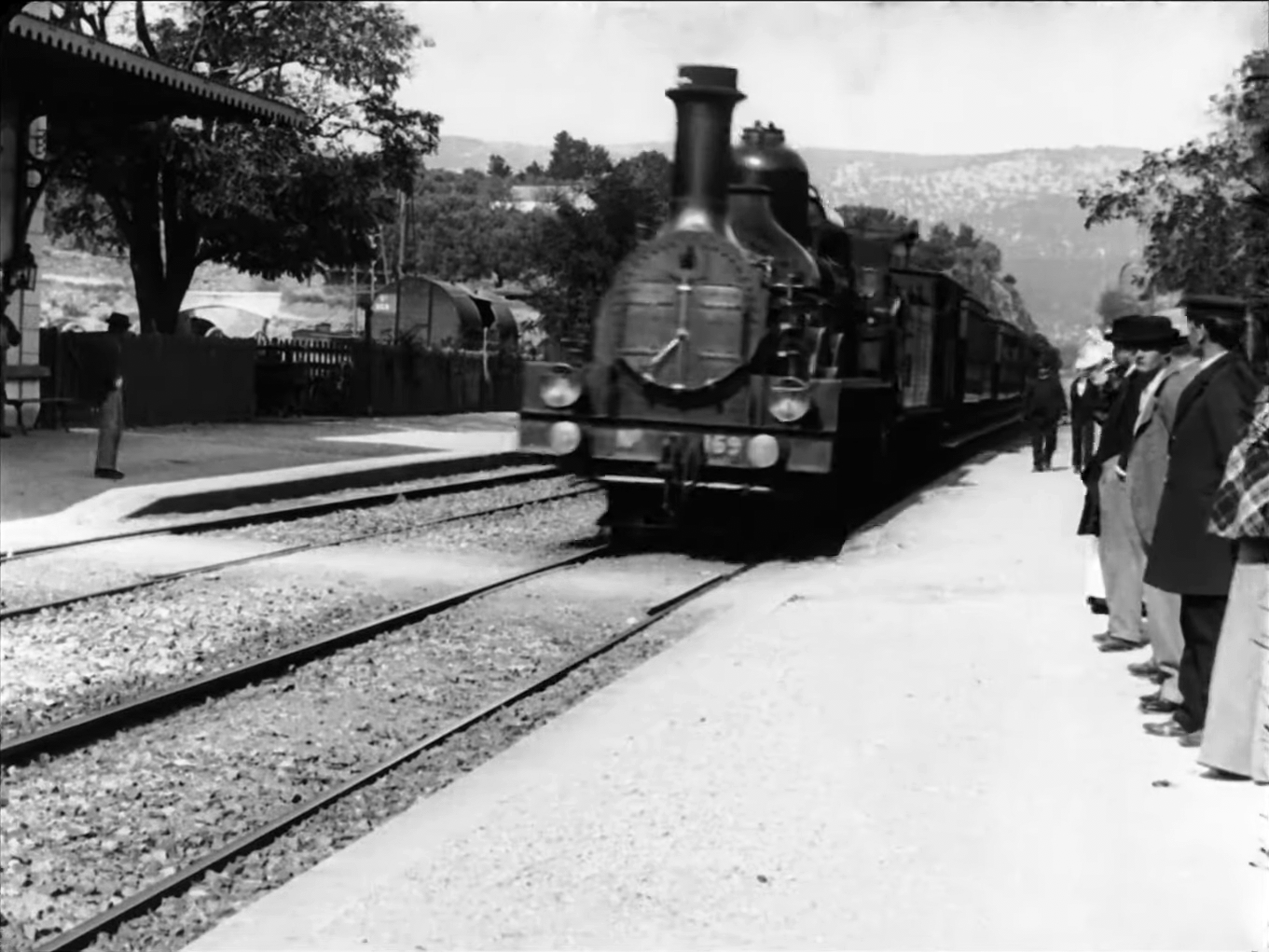
A frame from L'Arrivée d'un train en gare de La Ciotat, one of earliest films released in theaters, 1896

By the end of the 1880s, the introduction of lengths of celluloid photographic film and the invention of motion picture cameras, which could photograph a rapid sequence of images using only one lens, allowed action to be captured and stored on a single compact reel of film.

Movies were initially shown publicly to one person at a time through "peep show" devices such as the Electrotachyscope, Kinetoscope, and the Mutoscope. In the late 1890s, exhibitors managed to project films on large screens for theatre audiences.

The first public screenings of films where admission was charged were made in 1895 by the American Woodville Latham and his sons (using films produced by their Eidoloscope company), by German brothers Emile and Max Skladanowsky, and by French brothers Auguste and Louis Lumière, best known for L'Arrivée d'un train en gare de La Ciotat (1896), with 10 of their own productions. Private screenings had preceded these by several months, with Latham's slightly predating the others'.

=== 1910s: Early evolution ===
The earliest films were very short, typically a few minutes or less. Generally, they were a simple, singular, static shot that showed an event or action with no editing or other cinematic techniques. Examples of early films include Workers Leaving the Lumière Factory (1895) and its alternate versions, in which a still camera shows employees leaving their workplace through a gateway, and A Trip Down Market Street (1906), which had some sense of movement because it was shot from a cable car.

Around the turn of the 20th century, films started stringing several scenes together to tell a story. (The filmmakers who first put several shots or scenes discovered that, when one shot follows another, that act establishes a relationship between the content in the separate shots in the minds of the viewer. It is this relationship that makes all film storytelling possible. In a simple example, if a person is shown looking out a window, whatever the next shot shows, it will be regarded as the view the person was seeing.) Each scene was a single stationary shot with the action occurring before it. The scenes were later broken up into multiple shots photographed from different distances and angles.

A clip from the Charlie Chaplin silent film The Bond (1918)

Other techniques such as camera movement were developed as effective ways to tell a story with film. Until sound film became commercially practical in the late 1920s, motion pictures were a purely visual art, but these innovative silent films gained a hold on the public imagination. Rather than leave audiences with only the noise of the projector as an accompaniment, theater owners hired a pianist or organist or, in large urban theaters, a full orchestra to play music that fit the mood of the film at any given moment. By the early 1920s, most films came with a prepared list of sheet music to be used for this purpose, and complete film scores were composed for major productions.

The rise of European cinema was interrupted by the outbreak of World War I (1914–1918), while the film industry in the U.S. flourished with the rise of Hollywood, typified most prominently by the innovative work of D. W. Griffith in The Birth of a Nation (1915) and Intolerance (1916). However, in the 1920s, European filmmakers such as Sergei Eisenstein, F. W. Murnau, and Fritz Lang, in many ways inspired by the meteoric wartime progress of film through Griffith, along with the contributions of actors like Charles "Charlie" Chaplin, Buster Keaton, and others, quickly caught up with American film-making and continued to further advance the medium.

=== 1920s–1960s: Evolution in sound ===
In the late 1920s, the development of electronic sound recording technologies made it practical to incorporate a soundtrack of speech, music, and sound effects synchronized with the action on the screen. The resulting sound films were initially distinguished from the usual silent "moving pictures" or "movies" by calling them "talking pictures" or "talkies". The revolution they brought was swift. By 1931, silent film was practically extinct in the U.S. and already being referred to as "the old medium". As of 2013, only 14% of America's silent feature films from 1912 to 1929 existed in their original format.

Sound in cinema started gaining acceptance with movies like The Jazz Singer (1927)

The evolution of sound in cinema began with the idea of combining moving images with existing phonograph sound technology. Early sound-film systems, such as Thomas Edison's Kinetoscope and the Vitaphone used by Warner Bros., laid the groundwork for synchronized sound in film. The Vitaphone system, produced alongside Bell Telephone Company and Western Electric, faced initial resistance due to expensive equipping costs, but sound in cinema gained acceptance with movies like Don Juan (1926) and The Jazz Singer (1927).

Meanwhile, Europe standardized on Tobis-Klangfilm and Tri-Ergon systems. This new technology allowed for greater fluidity in film, giving rise to more complex and epic movies like King Kong (1933).

As the threat of television emerged in the 1940s and 1950s, the film industry needed to innovate to attract audiences. In terms of sound technology, this meant the development of surround sound and more sophisticated audio systems, such as Cinerama's seven-channel system. However, these advances required a large number of personnel to operate the equipment and maintain the sound experience in theaters. As an extra step, major film studios also started buying interests in TV stations, gaining a majority control of television studios by 1948.

In 1966, Dolby Laboratories introduced the Dolby A noise reduction system, which became a standard in the recording industry and eliminated the hissing sound associated with earlier standardization efforts. Dolby Stereo, a revolutionary surround sound system that was introduced audiences by 1977, followed and allowed cinema designers to take acoustics into consideration when designing theaters. This innovation enabled audiences in smaller venues to enjoy comparable audio experiences to those in larger city theaters.

=== 1930s: Evolution in color ===
A significant technological advancement in film was the introduction of "natural color," where color was captured directly from nature through photography, as opposed to being manually added to black-and-white prints using techniques like hand-coloring or stencil-coloring. Early color processes often produced colors that appeared far from "natural". Unlike the rapid transition from silent films to sound films, color's replacement of black-and-white happened more gradually.

A crucial innovation was the three-strip version of the Technicolor process, first used in animated cartoons in 1932. The process was later applied to live-action short films, specific sequences in feature films, and finally, for an entire feature film, Becky Sharp, in 1935. Although the process was expensive, the positive public response, as evidenced by increased box office revenue, generally justified the additional cost. Consequently, the number of films made in color gradually increased year after year. One of the first mainstream films to use color was The Wizard of Oz (1939).

=== 1950s: Growing influence of television ===
In the early 1950s, black-and-white television started receiving criticism, with many believing that TV failed to reach the lofty intellectual and cultural expectations that accompanied its introduction. In an attempt to lure audiences back to theaters, bigger screens, widescreen processes, polarized 3D projection, and stereophonic sound were introduced, and more films were made in color—which soon became the rule, rather than the exception. Some important mainstream Hollywood films were still being made in black-and-white as late as the mid-1960s, but they marked the end of an era. Color television receivers had been available in the U.S. since the mid-1950s, but initially, they were very expensive and few broadcasts were in color.

During the 1960s, prices gradually came down, color broadcasts became common, and sales boomed. The overwhelming public verdict in favor of color was clear. After the final flurry of black-and-white films had been released in mid-decade, all Hollywood studio productions were filmed in color, with the usual exceptions made only at the insistence of "star" filmmakers such as Peter Bogdanovich, Martin Scorsese, and Alfred Hitchcock with his film Psycho (1960).

=== 1960s–present: Modern cinema ===
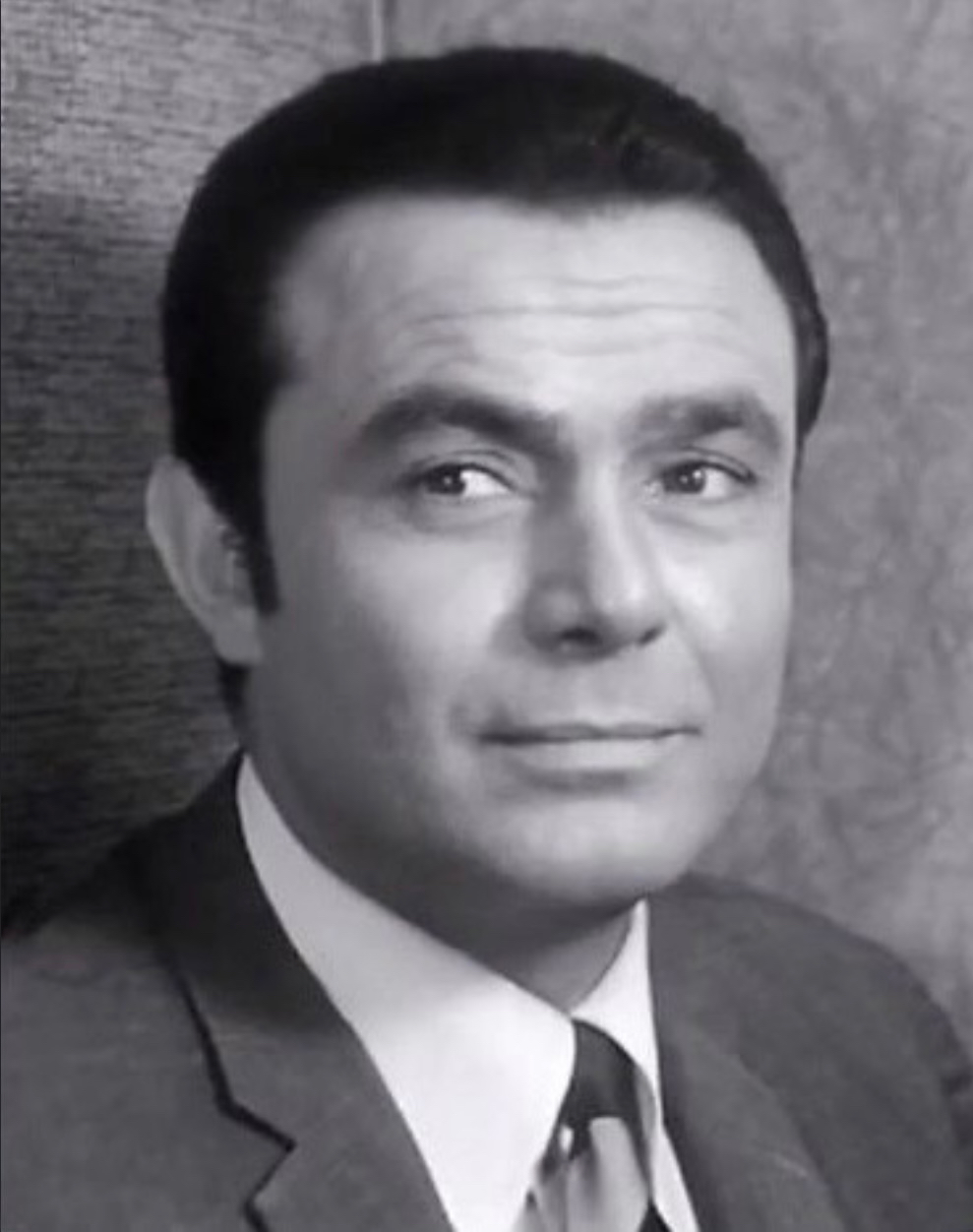
Salah Zulfikar, one of the most popular actors in the golden age of Egyptian Cinema.

The decades following the decline of the studio system in the 1960s saw changes in the production and style of film. Various "New Wave" movements (including the French New Wave, New German Cinema wave, Indian New Wave, Japanese New Wave, New Hollywood, and Egyptian New Wave) and the rise of film-school-educated independent filmmakers, known as the "Film School Generation" of the 1960s and 1970s, contributed to the changes the medium experienced in the latter half of the 20th century.

Digital technology has been the driving force for change throughout the 1990s and into the 2000s. Digital 3D projection largely replaced earlier problem-prone 3D film systems of the 1950s and 1980s and became briefly popular in the early 2010s with films like Avatar (2009). Large-screen cinemas systems using 35mm and 70mm film were developed in the late 2010s, with companies like the IMAX corporation. By the mid-2010s, theatres were also trying a 4D approach to movies, in which audiences could experience smells, wind, smoke/fog, vibrations, and other sensations. By the mid-2020s, an even more "immersive" 4DX film format was gaining popularity.

== Film theory ==
"Film theory" seeks to develop concise and systematic concepts or principles that apply to the study of film as art. The concept of film as an art-form began in 1911 with Ricciotto Canudo's manifest The Birth of the Sixth Art. The Moscow Film School, the oldest film school in the world, was founded in 1919, to teach about and research film theory. Formalist film theory, led by Rudolf Arnheim, Béla Balázs, and Siegfried Kracauer, emphasized how film differed from reality and thus could be considered a valid fine art. André Bazin reacted against this theory by arguing that film's artistic essence lay in its ability to mechanically reproduce reality, not in its differences from reality, and this gave rise to realist theory. More recent analysis spurred by Jacques Lacan's psychoanalysis, Ferdinand de Saussure's semiotics, Laura Mulvey's male gaze theory, among others, has given rise to psychoanalytic film theory, structuralist film theory, feminist film theory, and others. On the other hand, critics from the analytical philosophy tradition, influenced by Ludwig Wittgenstein, try to clarify misconceptions used in theoretical studies and produce analysis of a film's vocabulary and its link to a form of life.

=== Language ===
Film is considered to have its own multi-sensory language that "transcends the limitations of purely verbal or textual communication". James Monaco wrote a classic text on film theory, titled "How to Read a Film," that addresses this. Director Ingmar Bergman famously said, "Andrei Tarkovsky for me is the greatest director, the one who invented a new language, true to the nature of film, as it captures life as a reflection, life as a dream."

An example of film language is a "shot/reverse shot" or a sequence of back and forth images of a character looking offscreen, followed by another character, then a repetition of this, which is a language understood by the audience to indicate a conversation or other type of interaction. This describes another theory of film, the 180-degree rule, as a visual story-telling device with an ability to place a viewer in a context of being psychologically present through the use of visual composition and editing. The "Hollywood style" includes this narrative theory, due to the overwhelming practice of the rule by movie studios based in Hollywood, California, during film's classical era. Another example of cinematic language is having a shot that zooms in on an actor with an expression of reflection that cuts to a shot of a younger actor who vaguely resembles the first actor, indicating that the character is remembering a past self. Known as a "flashback," it is an edit of compositions that causes a time transition and typically reveals information about the character's history to the audience.

=== Montage ===
Montage is a film editing technique in which separate pieces of film are selected, edited, and assembled to create a new section or sequence within a film. This technique can be used to convey a narrative or to create an emotional or intellectual effect by juxtaposing different shots, often for the purpose of condensing time, space, or information. Montage can involve flashbacks, parallel action, or the interplay of various visual elements to enhance the storytelling or create symbolic meaning.

The concept of montage emerged in the 1920s, with pioneering Soviet filmmakers like Sergei Eisenstein and Lev Kuleshov developing the theory of montage. Eisenstein's film Battleship Potemkin (1925) is an example of the innovative use of montage, where he employed complex juxtapositions of images to create a visceral impact on the audience.

As the art of montage evolved, filmmakers began incorporating musical and visual counterpoint to create more dynamic and engaging experiences for viewers. The development of scene construction through mise-en-scène, editing, and special effects led to more sophisticated techniques that can be compared to those utilized in opera and ballet.

The French New Wave movement of the late 1950s and 1960s also embraced the montage technique, with filmmakers such as Jean-Luc Godard and François Truffaut using montage to create distinct and innovative films.

In contemporary cinema, montage continues to play a role in shaping narratives and creating emotional, memorable sequences. Filmmakers have adapted the traditional montage technique to suit the evolving aesthetics and storytelling styles of modern cinema.

- Music video influence: The influence of music videos on film has led to the incorporation of stylized montage sequences, often accompanied by popular music.
- Sports and training montages: The sports and training montage has become a staple in modern cinema, often used to condense time and show a character's growth or development. Examples can be found in films like Rocky (1976), The Karate Kid (1984), and Million Dollar Baby (2004).
- Cross-cutting and parallel action: Contemporary filmmakers use montage to create tension and suspense by cross-cutting between parallel storylines. Christopher Nolan's Inception (2010) and Dunkirk (2017) employ complex cross-cutting techniques to build narrative momentum and heighten the audience's emotional engagement.
- Thematic montage: Montage can also be used to convey thematic elements or motifs in a film. Wes Anderson's The Royal Tenenbaums (2001) employs montage to create a visual language that reflects the film's themes of family, nostalgia, and loss.

As the medium of film continues to evolve, montage remains an integral aspect of visual storytelling, with filmmakers finding new and innovative ways to employ this technique.

=== Film criticism ===
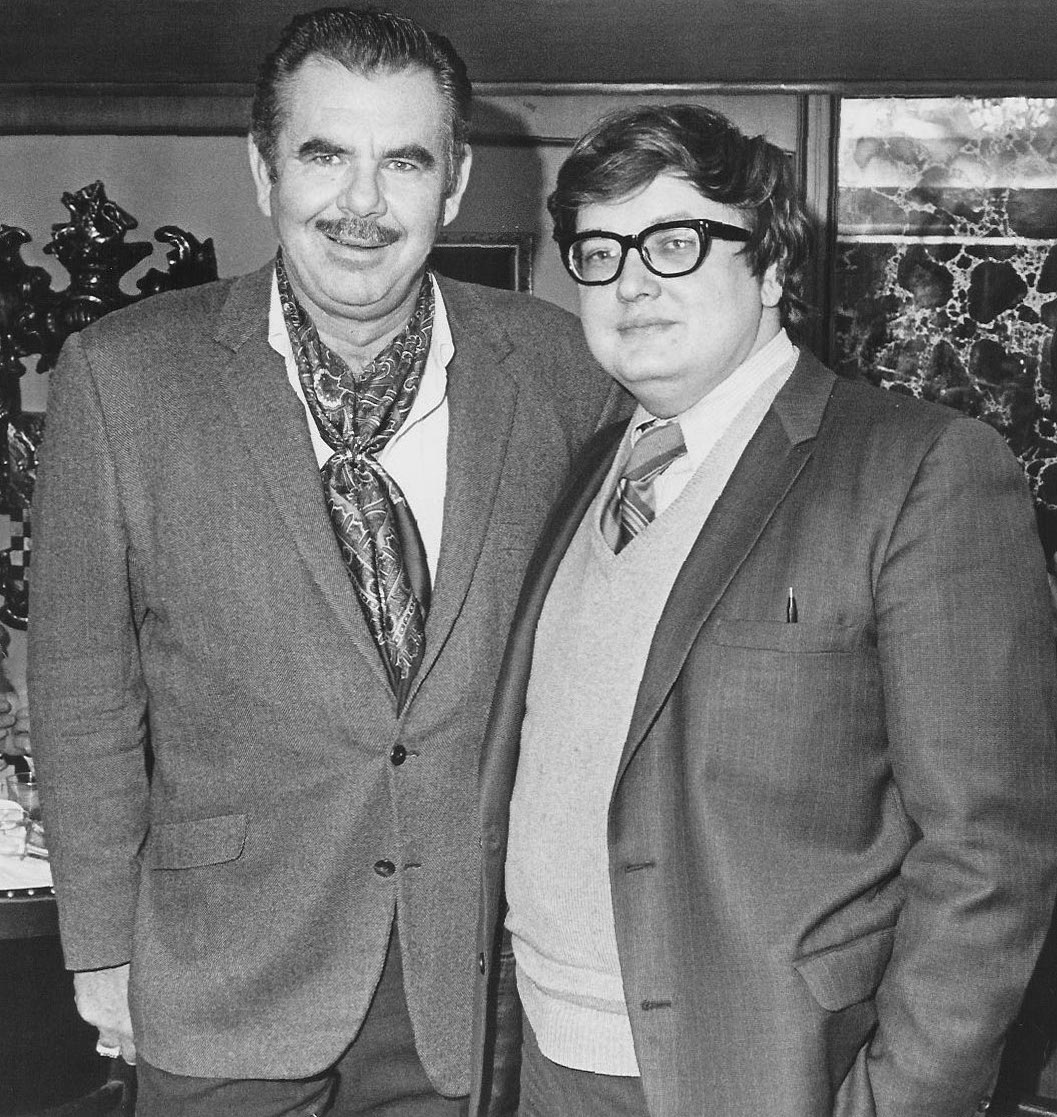
Chicago critic Roger Ebert (right) with director Russ Meyer

Film criticism is the analysis and evaluation of films. Traditionally, this was divided into two categories:

- Academic criticism by film scholars: Critics who take a more academic approach to films, through publishing in film journals and writing books about films using film theory or film studies approaches, study how film and filming techniques work, and what effect they have on people. Rather than having their reviews published in newspapers or appearing on television, their articles are published in scholarly journals or up-market magazines. They also tend to be affiliated with colleges or universities as professors or instructors.
- Journalistic film criticism: Journalist film critics are sometimes called film reviewers. Film critics working for newspapers, magazines, and broadcast media mainly review new releases and tend to be more "consumer-oriented".

With the advent of online review aggregators, like Metacritic and Rotten Tomatoes, reviews from both critics and audiences have become easily accessible. A high or low score on a review aggregator can help drive or deter viewers from going to theatres, despite persuasive movie marketing. Similarly, word-of-mouth buzz and audience reviews via social media can impact enthusiasm for a film.

If a movie can illuminate the lives of other people who share this planet with us and show us not only how different they are but, how even so, they share the same dreams and hurts, then it deserves to be called great.

— Roger Ebert (1986)

The impact of a reviewer on a given film's box office performance is a matter of debate. For example, positive film reviews have been shown to spark interest in little-known films. Conversely, mass marketed action and comedy films tend not to be greatly affected by a critic's overall judgment of a film; similarly, horror and sci-fi fans generally see anything in their genre, regardless of reviews. In 2004, a survey found that TV ads and recommendations from others had the most influence on movie-going habits, with each factor cited by about 70% of respondents. Professional reviews ran at 33%, while online ratings influenced 28%. However, there have been many films in which film companies had so little confidence in a project that they refused to give reviewers an advanced viewing (or "pre-screening") to avoid widespread panning of the film.

== Industry ==
The making and showing of motion pictures became a source of profit almost as soon as the process was invented. Upon seeing how successful their new invention, and its product, was in their native France, the Lumière brothers set about touring the continent to exhibit the first films at public screenings. They opened Cinématographe theaters in London, Brussels, and Belgium.

April 1896 is considered the birth of the American movie theater, with Edison renting the Koster and Bial’s Music Hall for the first public demonstration of his Vitascope after he learned the Lumieres were planning their first American exhibition.

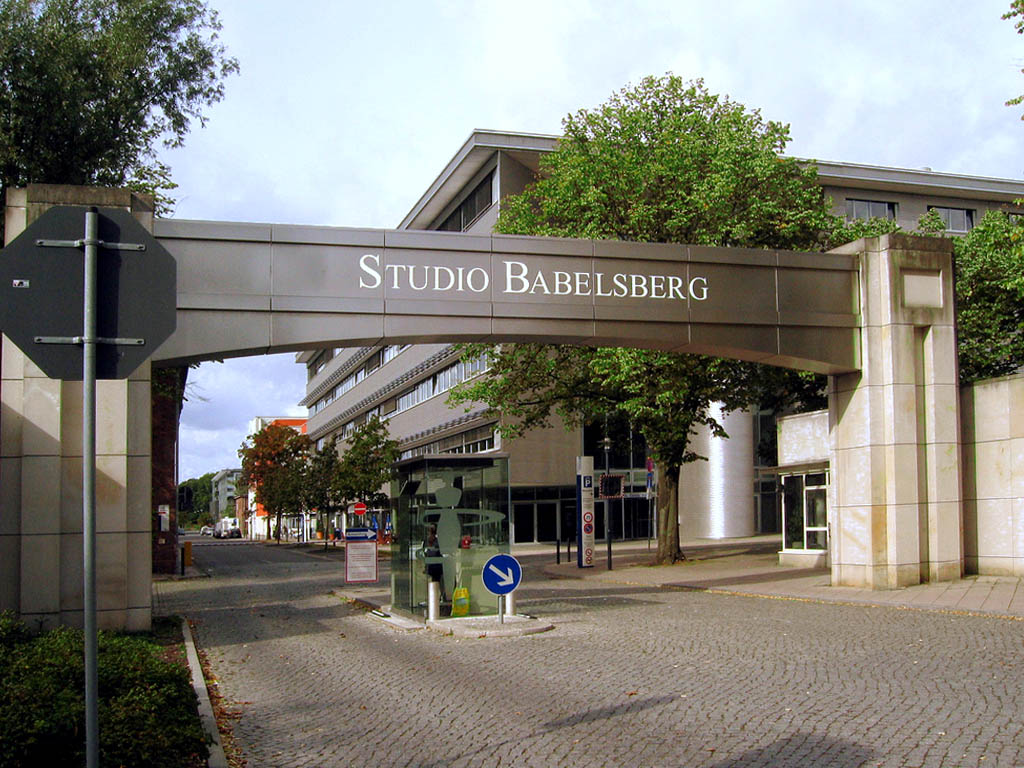
Founded in 1912, the Babelsberg Studio near Berlin was the first large-scale film studio in the world, and the forerunner to Hollywood. It still produces global blockbusters every year.

The Oberammergau Passion Play of 1898 was the first commercial motion picture ever produced. Other pictures soon followed, and motion pictures became a separate industry that overshadowed vaudeville. Dedicated theaters and companies formed specifically to produce and distribute films, while motion picture actors became major celebrities and commanded huge fees for their performances. In 1917, director-actor Charlie Chaplin was offered a contratct of $1 million for eight films. From 1931 to 1956, film was also the only image storage and playback system for television programming until the introduction of videotape recorders. In the U.S., much of the film industry is centered around Hollywood, California. Mumbai-centered Bollywood is the center of Indian film industry's Hindi cinema and produces the largest number of films in the world. Though the expense involved in making films has led cinema production to concentrate under the auspices of movie studios, recent advances in affordable film making equipment have allowed independent film productions to flourish.

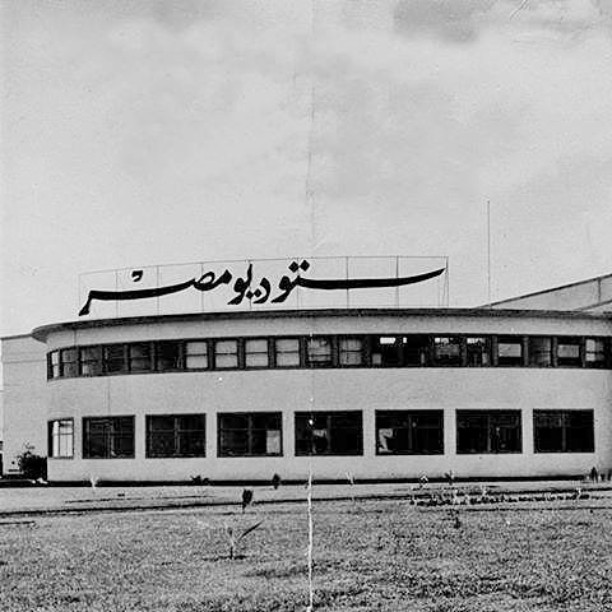
Founded in 1935, Studio Misr near the Giza Pyramid complex, was the first large-scale film studio in Africa and the Middle East.

Profit is a key force in the industry, due to the costly and risky nature of filmmaking; many films have large cost overruns, an example being Kevin Costner's Waterworld. Yet many filmmakers strive to create works of lasting social significance. The Academy Awards (also known as "the Oscars") are the most prominent film awards in the United States, providing recognition each year to films, based on their artistic merits. There is also a large industry for educational and instructional films made in lieu of or in addition to lectures and texts. Revenue in the industry is sometimes volatile due to the reliance on blockbuster films released in movie theaters. The rise of alternative home entertainment has raised questions about the future of the cinema industry, and Hollywood employment has become less reliable, particularly for medium and low-budget films.

== Associated fields ==
Derivative academic fields of study may both interact with and develop independently of filmmaking, as in film theory and analysis. Fields of academic study have been created that are derivative or dependent on the existence of film, such as film criticism, film history, divisions of film propaganda in authoritarian governments, or psychological on subliminal effects (e.g., of a flashing soda can during a screening). These fields may further create derivative fields, such as a movie review section in a newspaper or a television guide. Sub-industries can spin off from film, such as popcorn makers, and film-related toys (e.g., Star Wars figures). Sub-industries of pre-existing industries may deal specifically with film, such as product placement and other advertising within films.

== Terminology ==
The terminology used for describing motion pictures varies considerably between British and American English. In British usage, the name of the medium is film. The word movie is understood but seldom used. Additionally, the pictures (plural) is used somewhat frequently to refer to the place where movies are exhibited; in American English this may be called the movies, but that term is becoming outdated. In other countries, the place where movies are exhibited may be called a cinema or movie theatre.

By contrast, in the United States, movie is the predominant term for the medium. Although the words film and movie are sometimes used interchangeably, film is more often used when considering a work's artistic, theoretical, or technical aspects. The term movie more often refers to a work's entertainment or commercial aspects.

Further terminology is used to distinguish various forms and media used in the film industry. Motion pictures and moving pictures are frequently used terms for films and movie productions specifically intended for theatrical exhibitions, such as Star Wars, although in United States copyright law, the term motion picture refers to any work consisting of moving images regardless of format or length. DVD, Blu-ray Disc, and videotape are video formats that can reproduce a photochemical film. A reproduction based on such is called a transfer. After the advent of theatrical film as an industry, the television industry began using videotape as a recording medium. For many decades, tape was solely an analog medium onto which moving images could be either recorded or transferred. Film and filming refer to the photochemical medium that chemically records a visual image and the act of recording respectively. However, the act of shooting images with other visual media, such as with a digital camera, is still called filming, and the resulting works often called films as interchangeable to movies, despite not being shot on film. Silent films need not be utterly silent, but are films and movies without an audible dialogue, including those that have a musical accompaniment. The word talkies refers to the earliest sound films created to have audible dialogue recorded for playback along with the film, regardless of a musical accompaniment. Cinema either broadly encompasses both films and movies, or it is roughly synonymous with film and theatrical exhibition, and both are capitalized when referring to a category of art. The silver screen refers to the projection screen used to exhibit films and, by extension, is also used as a metonym for the entire film industry.

Widescreen refers to a larger width to height in the frame, compared to earlier historic aspect ratios. A feature-length film, or feature film, is of a conventional full length, usually 60 minutes or more, and can commercially stand by itself without other films in a ticketed screening. A short is a film that is not as long as a feature-length film, often screened with other shorts, or preceding a feature-length film. An independent is a film made outside the conventional film industry.

In American usage, one talks of a screening or projection of a movie or video on a screen at a public or private theater. In British English, a film showing happens at a cinema (never a theatre, which is a different medium and place altogether). Cinema usually refers to an arena designed specifically to exhibit films, where the screen is affixed to a wall, while theatre usually refers to a place where live, non-recorded action or combination thereof occurs from a podium or other type of stage, including the amphitheatre. Theatres can still screen movies in them, though the theatre would be retrofitted to do so. One might propose going to the cinema when referring to the activity, or sometimes to the pictures in British English, whereas the American expression is usually going to the movies. A cinema usually shows a mass-marketed movie using a front-projection screen process with either a film projector or, more recently, with a digital projector. But cinemas may also show theatrical movies from their home video transfers that include Blu-ray Disc, DVD, and videocassette when they possess sufficient projection quality or based upon need, such as movies that exist only in their transferred state, which may be due to the loss or deterioration of the film master and prints from which the movie originally existed. Due to the advent of digital film production and distribution, physical film might be absent entirely.

A double feature is a screening of two independently marketed, stand-alone feature films. A viewing is a watching of a film. Sales and at the box office refer to tickets sold at a theater, or more currently, rights sold for individual showings. A release is the distribution and often simultaneous screening of a film. A preview is a screening in advance of the main release.

Any film may also have a sequel, which portrays events following those in the film. Bride of Frankenstein is an early example. When there are more films than one with the same characters, story arcs, or subject themes, these movies become a series, such as the James Bond series. Existing outside a specific story timeline usually does not exclude a film from being part of a series. A film that portrays events occurring earlier in a timeline with those in another film, but is released after that film, is sometimes called a prequel, an example being Butch and Sundance: The Early Days.

The credits, or end credits, are a list that gives credit to the people involved in the production of a film. Films from before the 1970s usually start a film with credits, often ending with only a title card, saying "The End" or some equivalent, often an equivalent that depends on the language of the production. From then onward, a film's credits usually appear at the end of most films. However, films with credits that end a film often repeat some credits at or near the start of a film and therefore appear twice, such as that film's acting leads, while less frequently some appearing near or at the beginning only appear there, not at the end, which often happens to the director's credit. The credits appearing at or near the beginning of a film are usually called titles or beginning titles. A post-credits scene is a scene shown after the end of the credits. Ferris Bueller's Day Off has a post-credits scene in which Ferris tells the audience that the film is over and they should go home.

A film's cast refers to a collection of the actors and actresses who appear, or star, in a film. A star is an actor or actress, often a popular one, and in many cases, a celebrity who plays a central character in a film. Occasionally the word can also be used to refer to the fame of other members of the crew, such as a director or other personality, such as Martin Scorsese. A crew is usually interpreted as the people involved in a film's physical construction outside cast participation, and it could include directors, film editors, photographers, grips, gaffers, set decorators, prop masters, and costume designers. A person can both be part of a film's cast and crew, such as Woody Allen, who directed and starred in Take the Money and Run.

A film goer, movie goer, or film buff is a person who likes or often attends films and movies, and any of these, though more often the latter, could also see oneself as a student to films and movies or the filmic process. Intense interest in films, film theory, and film criticism, is known as cinephilia. A film enthusiast is known as a cinephile or cineaste.

=== Preview ===
Preview performance refers to a showing of a film to a select audience, usually for the purposes of corporate promotions, before the public film premiere itself. Previews are sometimes used to judge audience reaction, which if unexpectedly negative, may result in recutting or even refilming certain sections based on the audience response. One example of a film that was changed after a negative response from the test screening is 1982's First Blood. After the test audience responded very negatively to the death of protagonist John Rambo, a Vietnam veteran, at the end of the film, the company wrote and re-shot a new ending in which the character survives.

=== Trailer and teaser ===
Trailers or previews are advertisements for films that will be shown in 1 to 3 months at a cinema. Back in the early days of cinema, with theaters that had only one or two screens, only certain trailers were shown for the films that were going to be shown there. Later, when theaters added more screens or new theaters were built with a lot of screens, all different trailers were shown even if they were not going to play that film in that theater. Film studios realized that the more trailers that were shown (even if it was not going to be shown in that particular theater) the more patrons would go to a different theater to see the film when it came out. The term trailer comes from their having originally been shown at the end of a film program.

That practice did not last long because patrons tended to leave the theater after the films ended, but the name has stuck. Trailers are now shown before the film (or the "A film" in a double feature program) begins. Film trailers are also common on DVDs and Blu-ray Discs, as well as on the Internet and mobile devices. Trailers are created to be engaging and interesting for viewers. As a result, in the Internet era, viewers often seek out trailers to watch them. Of the ten billion videos watched online annually in 2008, film trailers ranked third, after news and user-created videos. A teaser is a much shorter preview or advertisement that lasts only 10 to 30 seconds. Teasers are used to get patrons excited about a film coming out in the next six to twelve months. Teasers may be produced even before the film production is completed.

== Culture ==
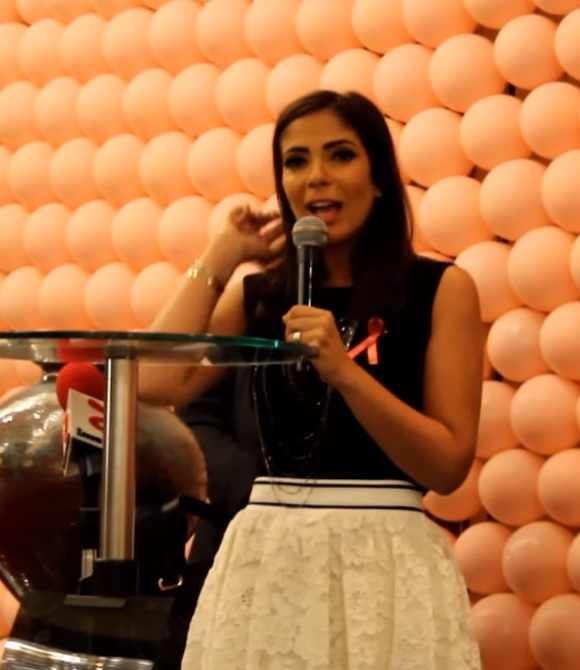
Mona Zaki, Egyptian film star, whose films influenced both the Egyptian and African cultures.

Films are cultural artifacts created by specific cultures, facilitating intercultural dialogue. It is considered to be an important art form that provides entertainment and historical value, often visually documenting a period of time. The visual basis of the medium gives it a universal power of communication, often stretched further through the use of dubbing or subtitles to translate the dialog into other languages. Just seeing a location in a film is linked to higher tourism to that location, demonstrating how powerful the suggestive nature of the medium can be.

=== Education and propaganda ===
Film is used for a range of goals, including education and propaganda due its ability to effectively intercultural dialogue. When the purpose is primarily educational, a film is called an "educational film". Examples are recordings of academic lectures and experiments, or a film based on a classic novel.

Film may be propaganda, in whole or in part, such as the films made by Leni Riefenstahl in Nazi Germany, US war film trailers during World War II, or artistic films made under Stalin by Sergei Eisenstein. They may also be works of political protest, as in the films of Andrzej Wajda, or more subtly, the films of Andrei Tarkovsky. The same film may be considered educational by some, and propaganda by others as the categorization of a film can be subjective.

== Production ==
At its core, the means to produce a film depend on the content the filmmaker wishes to show, and the apparatus for displaying it: the zoetrope merely requires a series of images on a strip of paper. Film production can, therefore, take as little as one person with a camera (or even without a camera, as in Stan Brakhage's 1963 film Mothlight), or thousands of actors, extras, and crew members for a live-action, feature-length epic. The necessary steps for almost any film can be boiled down to conception, planning, execution, revision, and distribution. The more involved the production, the more significant each of the steps becomes. In a typical production cycle of a Hollywood-style film, these main stages are defined as development, pre-production, production, post-production and distribution.

This production cycle usually takes three years. The first year is taken up with development. The second year comprises preproduction and production. The third year, post-production and distribution. The bigger the production, the more resources it takes, and the more important financing becomes; most feature films are artistic works from the creators' perspective (e.g., film director, cinematographer, screenwriter) and for-profit business entities for the production companies.

=== Crew ===
A film crew is a group of people hired by a film company, employed during the "production" or "photography" phase, for the purpose of producing a film or motion picture. Crew is distinguished from cast, who are the actors who appear in front of the camera or provide voices for characters in the film. The crew interacts with but is also distinct from the production staff, consisting of producers, managers, company representatives, their assistants, and those whose primary responsibility falls in pre-production or post-production phases, such as screenwriters and film editors. Communication between production and crew generally passes through the director and his/her staff of assistants. Medium-to-large crews are generally divided into departments with well-defined hierarchies and standards for interaction and cooperation between the departments. Other than acting, the crew handles everything in the photography phase: props and costumes, shooting, sound, electrics (i.e., lights), sets, and production special effects. Caterers (known in the film industry as "craft services") are usually not considered part of the crew.

=== Technology ===
Film stock consists of transparent celluloid, acetate, or polyester base coated with an emulsion containing light-sensitive chemicals. Cellulose nitrate was the first type of film base used to record motion pictures, but due to its flammability was eventually replaced by safer materials. Stock widths and the film format for images on the reel have had a rich history, though most large commercial films are still shot on (and distributed to theaters) as 35 mm prints.

Originally moving picture film was shot and projected at various speeds using hand-cranked cameras and projectors; though 1000 frames per minute (16 2/3 frame/s) is generally cited as a standard silent speed, research indicates most films were shot between 16 frame/s and 23 frame/s and projected from 18 frame/s on up (often reels included instructions on how fast each scene should be shown). When synchronized sound film was introduced in the late 1920s, a constant speed was required for the sound head. 24 frames per second were chosen because it was the slowest (and thus cheapest) speed which allowed for sufficient sound quality. The standard was set with Warner Bros.'s The Jazz Singer and their Vitaphone system in 1927. Improvements since the late 19th century include the mechanization of cameras – allowing them to record at a consistent speed, quiet camera design – allowing sound recorded on-set to be usable without requiring large "blimps" to encase the camera, the invention of more sophisticated filmstocks and lenses, allowing directors to film in increasingly dim conditions, and the development of synchronized sound, allowing sound to be recorded at exactly the same speed as its corresponding action. The soundtrack can be recorded separately from shooting the film, but for live-action pictures, many parts of the soundtrack are usually recorded simultaneously.

As a medium, film is not limited to motion pictures, since the technology developed as the basis for photography. It can be used to present a progressive sequence of still images in the form of a slideshow. Film has also been incorporated into multimedia presentations and often has importance as primary historical documentation. However, historic films have problems in terms of preservation and storage, and the motion picture industry is exploring many alternatives. Most films on cellulose nitrate base have been copied onto modern safety films. Some studios save color films through the use of separation masters: three B&W negatives each exposed through red, green, or blue filters (essentially a reverse of the Technicolor process). Digital methods have also been used to restore films, although their continued obsolescence cycle makes them (as of 2006) a poor choice for long-term preservation. Film preservation of decaying film stock is a matter of concern to both film historians and archivists and to companies interested in preserving their existing products in order to make them available to future generations (and thereby increase revenue). Preservation is generally a higher concern for nitrate and single-strip color films, due to their high decay rates; black-and-white films on safety bases and color films preserved on Technicolor imbibition prints tend to keep up much better, assuming proper handling and storage.

Some films in recent decades have been recorded using analog video technology similar to that used in television production. Modern digital video cameras and digital projectors are gaining ground as well. These approaches are preferred by some film-makers, especially because footage shot with digital cinema can be evaluated and edited with non-linear editing systems (NLE) without waiting for the film stock to be processed. The migration was gradual, and as of 2005, most major motion pictures were still shot on film.

=== Independent ===
Independent filmmaking often takes place outside Hollywood, or other major studio systems. An independent film (or indie film) is a film initially produced without financing or distribution from a major film studio. Creative, business and technological reasons have all contributed to the growth of the indie film scene in the late 20th and early 21st century. On the business side, the costs of big-budget studio films also lead to conservative choices in cast and crew. There is a trend in Hollywood towards co-financing (over two-thirds of the films put out by Warner Bros. in 2000 were joint ventures, up from 10% in 1987). A hopeful director is almost never given the opportunity to get a job on a big-budget studio film without significant industry experience in film or television. Also, the studios rarely produce films with unknown actors, particularly in lead roles.

Before the advent of digital alternatives, the cost of professional film equipment and stock was also a hurdle to being able to produce, direct, or star in a traditional studio film. But the advent of consumer camcorders in 1985, and more importantly, the arrival of high-resolution digital video in the early 1990s, have lowered the technology barrier to film production significantly. Both production and post-production costs have been significantly lowered; in the 2000s, the hardware and software for post-production can be installed in a commodity-based personal computer. Technologies such as DVDs, FireWire connections and a wide variety of professional and consumer-grade video editing software make film-making relatively affordable.

Since the introduction of digital video DV technology, the means of production have become more democratized. Filmmakers can conceivably shoot a film with a digital video camera and edit the film, create and edit the sound and music, and mix the final cut on a high-end home computer. However, while the means of production may be democratized, financing, distribution, and marketing remain difficult to accomplish outside the traditional system. Most independent filmmakers rely on film festivals to get their films noticed and sold for distribution. The arrival of internet-based video websites such as YouTube and Veoh has further changed the filmmaking landscape, enabling indie filmmakers to make their films available to the public.

=== Open content film ===
An open content film is much like an independent film, but it is produced through open collaborations; its source material is available under a license which is permissive enough to allow other parties to create fan fiction or derivative works rather than a traditional copyright. Like independent filmmaking, open source filmmaking takes place outside Hollywood and other major studio systems.

=== Fan film ===
A fan film is a film or video inspired by a film, television program, comic book or a similar source, created by fans rather than by the source's copyright holders or creators. Fan filmmakers have traditionally been amateurs, but some of the most notable films have actually been produced by professional filmmakers as film school class projects or as demonstration reels. Fan films vary tremendously in length, from short faux-teaser trailers for non-existent motion pictures to rarer full-length motion pictures.

== Distribution ==
Film distribution is the process through which a film is made available for viewing by an audience. This is normally the task of a professional film distributor, who would determine the marketing strategy of the film, the media by which a film is to be exhibited or made available for viewing, and may set the release date and other matters. The film may be exhibited directly to the public either through a movie theater (historically the main way films were distributed) or television for personal home viewing (including on DVD-Video or Blu-ray Disc, video-on-demand, online downloading, television programs through broadcast syndication etc.). Other ways of distributing a film include rental or personal purchase of the film in a variety of media and formats, such as VHS tape or DVD, or Internet downloading or streaming using a computer.

== Animation ==
An animated image of a horse, made using eight pictures

Animation is a technique in which each frame of a film is produced individually, whether generated as a computer graphic, or by photographing a drawn image, or by repeatedly making small changes to a model unit (see claymation and stop motion), and then photographing the result with a special animation camera. When the frames are strung together and the resulting film is viewed at a speed of 16 or more frames per second, there is an illusion of continuous movement (due to the phi phenomenon). Generating such a film is very labor-intensive and tedious, though the development of computer animation has greatly sped up the process. Because animation is very time-consuming and often very expensive to produce, the majority of animation for TV and films comes from professional animation studios. However, the field of independent animation has existed at least since the 1950s, with animation being produced by independent studios (and sometimes by a single person). Several independent animation producers have gone on to enter the professional animation industry.

Limited animation is a way of increasing production and decreasing costs of animation by using "shortcuts" in the animation process. This method was pioneered by UPA and popularized by Hanna-Barbera in the United States, and by Osamu Tezuka in Japan, and adapted by other studios as cartoons moved from movie theaters to television. Although most animation studios are now using digital technologies in their productions, there is a specific style of animation that depends on film. Camera-less animation, made famous by film-makers like Norman McLaren, Len Lye, and Stan Brakhage, is painted and drawn directly onto pieces of film, and then run through a projector.

== See also ==
- Docufiction (hybrid genre)
- Filmophile
- Lists
  - Bibliography of film by genre
  - Glossary of motion picture terms
  - Index of video-related articles
  - List of film awards
  - List of film festivals
  - List of film periodicals
  - List of years in film
  - Lists of films
  - List of books on films
  - Outline of film
- Lost film
- The Movies, a simulation game about the film industry, taking place at the dawn of cinema
- Platforms
  - Television film
  - Web film
