= Autour d'une cabine =

1894 film by Charles-Émile Reynaud

- Autour d'une cabine
- Directed by: Émile Reynaud
- Music by: Gaston Paulin
- Color process: Hand painted
- Release date: 1894
- Running time: 1 minute 50 seconds, 10 minutes (as presented)
- Country: France
- Language: Silent

Autour d'une cabine ("Around A Cabin"), original full title Autour d'une cabine ou Mésaventures d'un copurchic aux bains de mer ("Around a Cabin or Misadventures of a Couple at the Seaside"), is an 1894 French short animated film directed by Émile Reynaud. It is an animated film made of 636 individual images hand painted in 1893. The film showed off Emile's invention, the Théâtre Optique. It was shown at the Musée Grévin from December 1894 until March 1900.

== Plot ==
The film consists of three casts of characters on a beach, containing two beach huts and a diving board. A woman jumps off the diving board into the water followed by a hesitant fat man. Taking his time he gets pushed by the woman into the water who then jumps in after him.

A woman plays with a dog who just jumped out of her hands. As she does this a man walking past jumps out and scares her to the floor. Helping her up, he apologises as she goes to get changed in the nearest beach hut. After doing so the man peeps on her. Another man comes out of the other beach hut, and on seeing the peeping tom spy on her gives him a kick and chases him off. After she comes out she takes off her gown and her and this new man go off into the water. They bob up and down in the water before she invites him to swim out of scene.

Once the couple have gone, a man sails out in a boat. He unfurls the sail, which has written on it the words: "La représentation est terminée" (the show is finished).
