= Un bon bock =

1892 lost French film

- Promotional poster for Pantomimes Lumineuses
- Directed by: Émile Reynaud
- Music by: Gaston Paulin
- Release date: 28 October 1892
- Running time: 15 minutes (approx)
- Country: France
- Language: Silent

Un bon bock (aka A Good Beer) is an 1892 French short animated film directed by Émile Reynaud. Painted in 1888, it was first screened on 28 October 1892 using the Théâtre Optique process, which allowed him to project a hand-painted colored film, before the invention of cinematograph.

== About the film ==
It consisted of 700 individually painted 6 x 6 cm pictures in a 50 meter long flexible strip. Reynaud manipulated the speed and repeated movements by moving the film back and forth through the projector to tell a visual story that lasted close to fifteen minutes.

It is one of the first animated films ever made and was the first to be screened on Reynaud's modified praxinoscope, the Théâtre Optique, translated as "optical theatre".

Alongside Le Clown et ses chiens - painted in 1890 - and Pauvre Pierrot - painted in 1891 - it was exhibited on 28 October 1892 when Émile Reynaud opened his Cabinet fantastique at the Musée Grévin. The program was billed as Pantomimes Lumineuses (Luminous pantomime), and lasted until February 1894. These were the first animated pictures publicly exhibited by means of picture bands. Reynaud gave the whole presentation himself manipulating the images.

It is considered a lost film. No copy exists, as Reynaud threw all but two of his picture bands into the Seine river as he was suffering of depression at that time.

== Synopsis ==
A wanderer enters a cabaret in the countryside and asks for a beer to a beautiful waitress. She comes back with the pint, as the wanderer begins to court her. In the meantime, the kitchen boy comes, drinks the beer and vanishes. The wanderer, misunderstanding, asks for another beer.

Then a traveler enters and has an argument with the first fellow. During the argument, the kitchen boy appears, sips the second beer and runs away. As the traveler quits, the customer finds his glass empty again. He calls the waitress, expresses his disappointment and leaves.

The kitchen boy comes in and explains to the waitress what he did with the two beers. They make fun together on the wanderer and leave.
