= François-Napoléon-Marie Moigno =

French Catholic priest, Jesuit, physicist and author

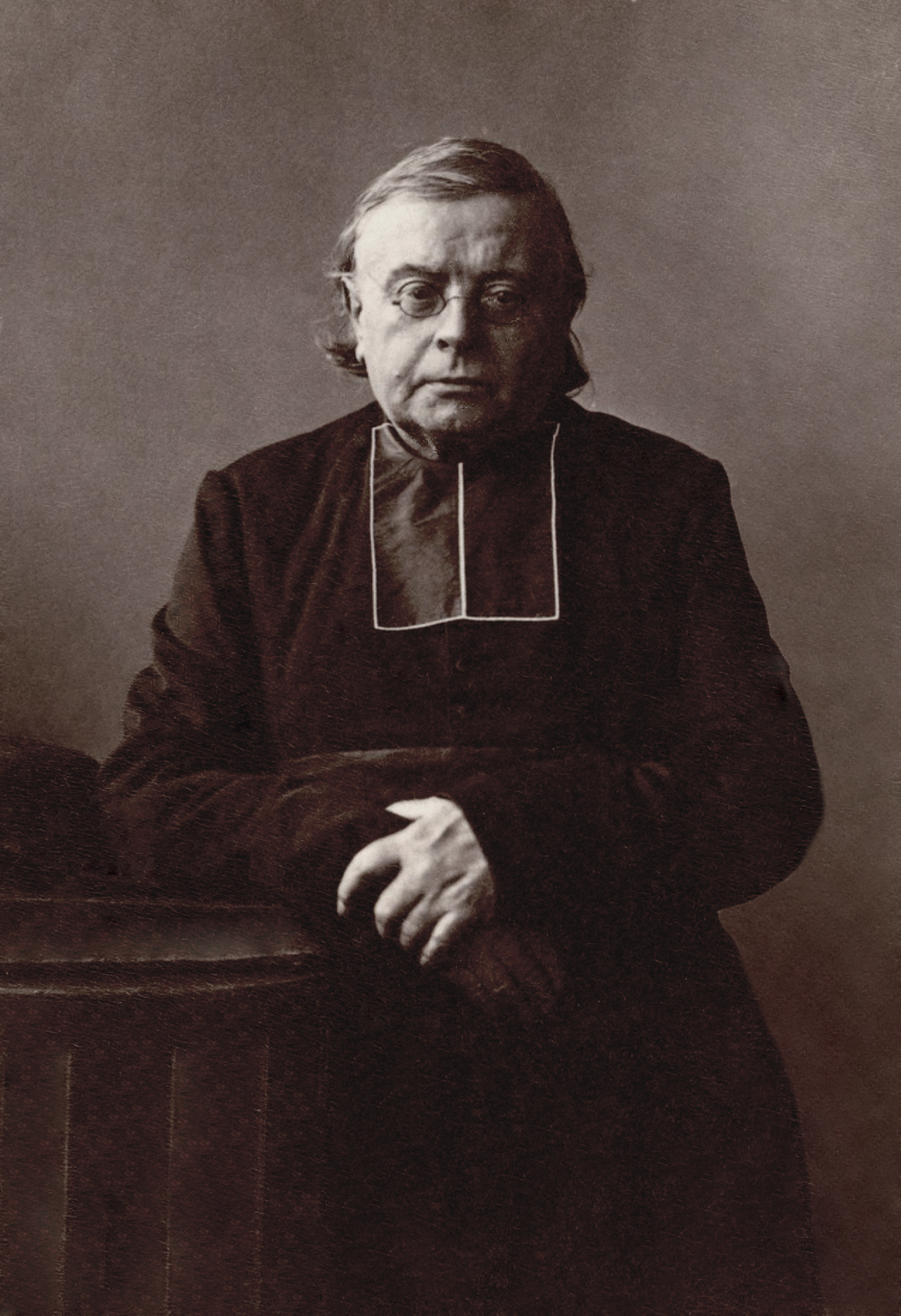
Abbé François-Napoléon-Marie Moigno (about 1870)

Abbé François-Napoléon-Marie Moigno (French: [mwaɲo]; 15 April 1804 – 14 July 1884) was a French Catholic priest and one time Jesuit, as well as a physicist and author. He considered himself a student of Cauchy.

== Life ==
Moigno was born at Guémené-sur-Scorff, Morbihan, in Brittany, on 15 April 1804. He received his early education at the Jesuit college at Sainte-Anne-d'Auray and entered the novitiate of the Society of Jesus on 2 September 1822. He did his theological studies at Montrouge, devoting his leisure to mathematics and physics.

On the outbreak of the Revolution of 1830, he left with his fellow Jesuits for Brieg in Switzerland. There he acquired several languages, including Hebrew and Arabic. In 1836 he was appointed professor of mathematics at the College of Sainte-Geneviève, Rue des Postes, in Paris. Here he became known not only as a scholar, but also as a preacher and writer. He wrote numerous articles for the press; he was engaged on one of his best known works, "Leçons de calcul différentiel et de calcul intégral", based chiefly on Cauchy's methods, and had already published the first volume, when he left the Jesuit Order in 1843.

Shortly afterwards he undertook a tour of Europe, contributing numerous letters to the journal "L'Epoque". He acted as chaplain of the Lycée Louis-le-Grand from 1848 to 1851. He became scientific editor of the "Presse" in 1850 and of the "Pays" in 1851 and in 1852 founded the scientific journal "Cosmos". In 1862 he founded "Les Mondes" and became associated with the clergy of Saint-Germain-des-Prés. In 1873 he was appointed a canon of the collegiate chapter of the Basilica of Saint-Denis. He died there on 14 July 1884.

== Works ==
Moigno was a prolific writer, an expositor of science rather than an original investigator. He also translated numerous English and Italian memoirs on science into French, and edited the "Actualités scientifiques".

Among his works are:

- Répertoire d'optique moderne (Paris, 1847–50)
- Traité de télégraphie électrique (Paris, 1849)
- Leçons de mécanique analytique (Paris, 1868)
- Saccharimétrie (Paris, 1869)
- Optique moléculaire (Paris, 1873)
- Les splendeurs de la foi (Paris, 1879–83)
- Les livres saints et la science (Paris, 1884)

and numerous articles in the "Comptes Rendus", "Revue Scientifique", "Cosmos", etc.

== See also ==
- List of Roman Catholic scientist-clerics
