= Le Clown et ses chiens =

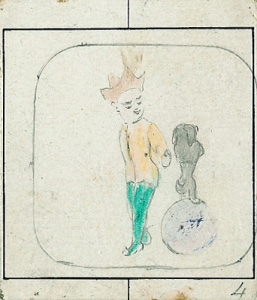
- Sketch for Le Clown et ses chiens
- Directed by: Émile Reynaud
- Music by: Gaston Paulin
- Color process: Probably hand painted
- Release date: 28 October 1892
- Running time: 10 minutes (approx)
- Country: France
- Language: Silent

Le Clown et ses chiens (aka The Clown and His Dogs) is an 1892 French short animated film hand-painted in colour by Émile Reynaud. It consists of 300 individually painted images and lasts about 10 minutes. It was the second film that Reynaud made for his Théâtre Optique, after Un bon bock (created in 1888).

== Plot ==
The film shows a clown entering a circus ring and greeting the audience, before he starts to perform tricks with three dogs. The dogs jump through hoops, walk on a ball and jump over a wand.

== Release ==
It premiered theatrically alongside Pauvre Pierrot and Un bon bock on 28 October 1892 as part of Reynaud's Pantomimes Lumineuses program at the Musée Grévin and lasted until February 1894.

Reynaud gave the whole presentation himself manipulating the images, accompanied by Gaston Paulin on the piano. With the exception of Un bon bock, and Théâtre Optique films after this one, no footage can be found due to Reynaud throwing all of his films (except for a partial of Pauvre Pierrot and Autour D’une Cabine) into the Seine river in 1900.
