= Pauvre Pierrot =

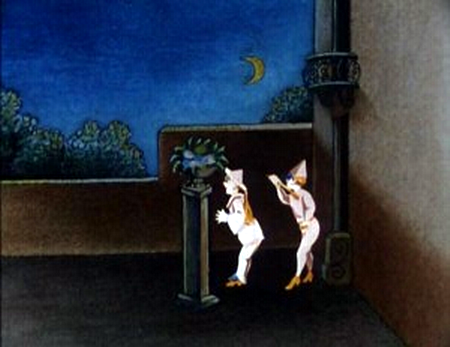
- Hand-painted scene
- Directed by: Charles-Émile Reynaud
- Music by: Gaston Paulin
- Release date: 28 October 1892
- Running time: Originally 15 minutes approx; after restoration 4 minutes approx
- Country: France
- Language: Silent

Pauvre Pierrot (or Poor Pete) is a French short animated film directed by Charles-Émile Reynaud in 1891 and released in 1892. It consists of 500 individually painted images and lasts about 15 minutes originally.

It is one of the first animated films ever made, and alongside Un bon bock (directed in 1888 of which only few images survive at the Cinémathèque française) and Le Clown et ses chiens was exhibited on 28 October 1892 when Charles-Émile Reynaud opened his Théâtre Optique at the Musée Grévin. It was the first film to demonstrate the Théâtre Optique system developed by Reynaud in 1888. Pauvre Pierrot is also believed to be the first known usage of film perforations. The combined performance of all three films was known as Pantomimes Lumineuses.

These were the first animated pictures publicly exhibited by means of picture bands. Reynaud gave the entire presentation himself by manipulating the images.

== Synopsis ==
Part of the film

One night, Harlequin encounters his beloved Columbina in a courtyard. Soon, however, Pierrot knocks on the door and they hide. Pierrot starts performing a serenade for Columbina, but Harlequin constantly interrupts. He pokes Pierrot with a stick and steals his bottle, always keeping just out of sight. Eventually Pierrot gets scared of the unseen prankster and leaves, allowing Harlequin to enter Columbina's house as the short ends.
