= 1868 in animation =

- Years in animation: 1865 1866 1867 1868 1869 1870 1871
- Centuries: 18th century · 19th century · 20th century
- Decades: 1830s 1840s 1850s 1860s 1870s 1880s 1890s
- Years: 1865 1866 1867 1868 1869 1870 1871

Events in 1868 in animation.

== Events ==
- Specific date unknown:
  - In 1868, the physicist James Clerk Maxwell had an improved zoetrope constructed. Instead of slits, his version used concave lenses with a focal length equaling the diameter of the cylinder. The virtual image was thus seen in the centre and appeared much more sharp and steady than in the original zoetrope. Maxwell drew several strips that mostly demonstrated subjects relating to physics, like the vibrations of a harp string or Helmholtz's vortex rings threading through each other. An article about the "Zootrope perfectionné" was published in the French science magazine Le Cosmos in 1869, but Maxwell never marketed his animation device.
  - In 1868, the Birmingham-based printer John Barnes Linnett received the first patent for the flip book. He gave the name kineograph to his device. A flip book is a small book with relatively springy pages, each having one in a series of animation images located near its unbound edge. The user bends all of the pages back, normally with the thumb. Then by a gradual motion of the hand, the user allows them to spring free one at a time. As with the phenakistoscope, the zoetrope, and the praxinoscope, the illusion of motion is created by the apparent sudden replacement of each image by the next in the series. Unlike those other inventions, no view-interrupting shutter or assembly of mirrors is required and no viewing device other than the user's hand is absolutely necessary. Early film animators cited flip books as their inspiration more often than the earlier devices, which did not reach as wide an audience.

== Births ==
=== January ===
- January 27: Frank Fiegel, American tramp and bar bouncer (inspiration for Popeye), (d. 1947).

=== July ===
- July 18: Hy Mayer, German-American political cartoonist, comic artist and animator (The Travels of Teddy, with Otto Messmer), (d. 1954).

=== August ===
- August 26: Edwin George Lutz, German-American cartoonist, illustrator, and non-fiction writer of training manuals about art and drawing techniques, (wrote the training manual Animated Cartoons - How they are made, their origin and development, which offered practical ideas for streamlining the production of animated drawings and influenced the techniques used by early animation studios; aspiring animator Walt Disney first read Lutz's book at the age of 19. The book was one of the primary animation guides used by Disney's Laugh-O-Grams studio team in Kansas City, Missouri, throughout the 1920s), (d. 1951).

=== November ===
- November 12: Ada Driver, Australian photographer, (created her own magic lantern slides and stereoscopic photographs, some of which have been bequeathed to the State Library of Queensland), (d. 1954).

== Sources ==
- Crafton, Donald (1993). Before Mickey: The Animated Film 1898–1928. Chicago: University of Chicago Press. ISBN 0-226-11667-0.
