= 1862 in animation =

- Years in animation: 1859 1860 1861 1862 1863 1864 1865
- Centuries: 18th century · 19th century · 20th century
- Decades: 1830s 1840s 1850s 1860s 1870s 1880s 1890s
- Years: 1859 1860 1861 1862 1863 1864 1865

Events in 1862 in animation.

== Events ==
- January: In May 1861, Henri Désiré du Mont had filed French patent 49,520 for "a photographic device for reproduction of the successive phases of movement". In January 1862, DuMont explained his motives and ambitions in a demonstration for the Société Française de Photographie, stating that photographers already knew how to photograph subjects in motion, such as a galloping horse, but showed no interest in recording multiple images. He believed that series of successive images were much more interesting because of the harmony in lines and shadows, and because the captured poses of people would be much more natural. He therefore developed his patented stereoscopic and stroboscopic viewing apparatus and a camera that could capture the successive phases of movements with intervals of only fractions of seconds. He would attach the resulting images to the circumference of a cylindrical or prismatic drum, optionally bound together on a strip of fabric.
- May 28 The construction of the bell towers of the Santos Passos Church was initiated, a project led by Porto's architect Pedro Ferreira. The completion of the church was financed by earnings from the plays and magic lantern slide shows of the Afonso Henriques Theatre.
- Specific date unknown:
  - The French pioneering animator Émile Reynaud started his career as a photographer in Paris.
  - The English inventor Peter Hubert Desvignes received an Honourable Mention "for ingenuity of construction" at the 1862 International Exhibition in London for his Mimoscope. He had created several monocular and stereoscopic variations of cylindrical stroboscopic devices, much like the later zoetrope. His device could "exhibit drawings, models, single or stereoscopic photographs, so as to animate animal movements, or that of machinery, showing various other illusions." Desvignes "employed models, insects and other objects, instead of pictures, with perfect success." The horizontal slits allowed a much improved view, with both eyes, of the opposite pictures.

== Births ==
=== May ===
- May 26: Georg Jacob, German orientalist and Turkologist, (he produced scholarly research into the subject of shadow play. Shadow plays are considered a precursor to silhouette animation), (d. 1937).

=== Specific date unknown ===
- Graystone Bird, English photographer, (much of Bird's most notable work, created during a peak period of his career in the 1890s and very early 1900s, involved creating pictorialist-style photographic images for publication-and-use as magic lantern slides. This was, at the time, a popular form of entertainment in private homes and public shows), (d. 1943).

== Sources ==
- Myrent, Glenn (1989). "Emile Reynaud: First Motion Picture Cartoonist". Film History. 3 (3). Indiana University Press: 191–202. JSTOR 3814977.
