= 1870 in animation =

- Years in animation: 1867 1868 1869 1870 1871 1872 1873
- Centuries: 18th century · 19th century · 20th century
- Decades: 1840s 1850s 1860s 1870s 1880s 1890s 1900s
- Years: 1867 1868 1869 1870 1871 1872 1873

Events in 1870 in animation.

== Events ==
- February 5: The Philadelphia-based engineer Henry Renno Heyl presented his Phasmatrope to 1500 persons at a church entertainment evening at the Philadelphia Academy of Music. This modified magic lantern had a wheel that could hold 16 photographic slides and a shutter. The wheel was rotated in front of the light source by an intermittent mechanism to project the slides successively, probably with a speed of 3 fps. The program contained three subjects: All Right (a popular Japanese acrobat), Brother Jonathan, and a waltzing couple. Brother Jonathan addressed the audience with a voice actor behind the screen and professed that "this art will rapidly develop into one of the greatest merit for instruction and enjoyment." The pictures of the waltzing couple survived and consist of four shots of costumed dancers (Heyl and a female dancing partner) that were repeated four times in the wheel. The pictures were posed. The waltzing animations were screened with an appropriate musical accompaniment by a 40-person orchestra. Heyl's only known other show was a screening on 16 March 1870 at the Franklin Institute.
- Specific date unknown:
  - The board game manufacturing company Milton Bradley and Co. had gained patents for the construction of the animation device zoetrope since 1867. The London Stereoscopic and Photographic Company was licensed as the British publisher, and repeated most of the Milton Bradley animations. In 1870, the Stereoscopic & Photographic Company made its own addition to the available zoetrope products. It added a set of twelve animations by the famous British illustrator George Cruikshank.
  - The French entertainer François Dominique Séraphin had popularised shadow plays in France during the 18th century. Séraphin died in 1800 but his shadow play shows continued, initially under the direction of his nephew. The shadow play theatre which Séraphin had established closed in 1870. The shadow play tradition is considered a precursor of silhouette animation.
  - Around 1870, the first demonstration of the Kaleidotrope took place at the Royal Polytechnic Institution: a slide with a single perforated metal or cardboard disc suspended on a spiral spring. The holes can be tinted with colored pieces of gelatin. When struck, the disc's vibration and rotation sends the colored dots of light swirling around in all sorts of shapes and patterns. It was dubbed "Kaleidotrope" when commercial versions were marketed.

== Deaths ==
=== October ===
- October 9: John Barnes Linnett, British lithograph printer, (the first person to patent the flip book, a type of small book with relatively springy pages, each having one in a series of animation images located near its unbound edge), dies at an unknown age. Early film animators cited flip books as their inspiration more often than the earlier animation devices, which did not reach as wide an audience.

== Sources ==
- Crafton, Donald (1993). Before Mickey: The Animated Film 1898–1928. Chicago: University of Chicago Press. ISBN 0-226-11667-0.
