= 1865 in animation =

- Years in animation: 1862 1863 1864 1865 1866 1867 1868
- Centuries: 18th century · 19th century · 20th century
- Decades: 1830s 1840s 1850s 1860s 1870s 1880s 1890s
- Years: 1862 1863 1864 1865 1866 1867 1868

Events in 1865 in animation.

== Events ==
- Specific date unknown:
  - The inventor William Ensign Lincoln invented the definitive version of the zoetrope in 1865, when he was about 18 years old and a sophomore at the Brown University in Providence, Rhode Island. Lincoln's patented version had the viewing slits on a level above the pictures, which allowed the use of easily replaceable strips of images. It also had an illustrated paper disc on the base, which was not always exploited on the commercially produced versions. On the advice of a local bookstore owner, Lincoln had sent a model to the board game manufacturing company Milton Bradley and Co. in an attempt to market the animation device.
  - Edmund Johann Krüss, representing the optical equipment company Krüss Optronic, received a patent for his version of the magic lantern. The device was a forerunner of movie projectors.
  - Around 1865, a disc with nine oval photographic images of Jan Evangelista Purkyně (1787–1869) turning around was probably created by the physiologist himself. Purkyně reportedly used the disc to entertain his grandchildren and show them how he, an old professor, could turn around at great speed.
  - Around 1865, the Cycloidotrope was introduced. It was a slide with an adjustable stylus bar for drawing geometric patterns on sooty glass when hand-cranked during the projection. The patterns are similar to that produced with a Spirograph.

== Births ==
=== December ===
- December 29: Otis Harlan, American actor and comedian (voice of Happy in Snow White and the Seven Dwarfs), (d. 1940).

== Sources ==
- Kaufman, J. B. (2012b). The Fairest One of All: The Making of Walt Disney's Snow White and the Seven Dwarfs. Weldon Owen. ISBN 978-1-61628-438-1.
