= 1863 in animation =

- Years in animation: 1860 1861 1862 1863 1864 1865 1866
- Centuries: 18th century · 19th century · 20th century
- Decades: 1830s 1840s 1850s 1860s 1870s 1880s 1890s
- Years: 1860 1861 1862 1863 1864 1865 1866

Events in 1863 in animation.

== Events ==
- January 1: On 1 January 1863, The Illustrated London News reported on a magic lantern production of Cinderella at the Royal Polytechnic Institution, in which the showman Henry Langdon Childe was involved in painting slides, following the designs of Henry George Hine.

== Births ==
=== April ===
- April 29: William Randolph Hearst, American film producer, newspaper publisher, and politician, (founder and owner of the animation studio International Film Service, produced animated adaptations of the comic strips Krazy Kat, The Katzenjammer Kids, And Her Name Was Maud, Happy Hooligan, Jerry on the Job, Bringing Up Father, Abie the Agent, and Judge Rummy), (d. 1951).
- April 30: Max Skladanowsky, German businessman, filmmaker, and inventor, (he performed dissolving magic lantern shows, for which he developed special multi-lens devices that allowed simultaneous projection of up to nine separate image sequences. He invented the Bioscop movie projector. He produced flip books and 3-D anaglyph image slides, (d. 1939).

=== December ===
- December 20: Agnes Deans Cameron, Canadian adventurer, educator, and travel writer, (the first white woman to reach the Arctic Ocean, Cameron then traveled extensively as a lecturer, showing magic lantern slides of her photographic images from her journey to the Arctic), (d. 1912).

=== Specific date unknown ===
- Charles Barker Howdill, English architect, photographer, and traveler, (he gave hundreds of illustrated magic lantern lectures about his journeys. He was among the first photographers to exhibit colour photographs at the Royal Photographic Society), (d. 1941).
