= 1859 in animation =

Events in 1859 in animation.

== Events ==
- April 7: the Belgian civil engineer and inventor Henri Désiré du Mont filed a Belgian patent for nine different versions of his Omniscope, of which most would show stereoscopic animation from stroboscopic discs or from cylinders with pictures on the outside. One version was built inside a peep-box and had a lens focusing a light-beam to project the image on a frosted glass screen. Another design combined two zoetropes with Charles Wheatstone's reflecting stereoscope in between.

== Births ==
=== February ===
- February 7: Alexander Black, American photographer, inventor, and writer (presented the magic lantern show Life through a Detective Camera(alternately titled Ourselves as Others See Us); created the pre-film "Picture Play" Miss Jerry, a series of posed magic lantern slides projected onto a screen with a dissolving stereopticon, accompanied by narration and music. It was the first example of a feature-length dramatic fiction on screen), (d. 1940).

=== December ===
- December 1: Constantin Philipsen, Danish filmmaker, (toured Scandinavian nations from 1898 with his magic lantern; opened Denmark's first viable cinema, the 158-seat Kosmorama in 1904, in Copenhagen), (d. 1925).

=== Specific date unknown ===
- Cecil Shadbolt, British photographer (pioneered aerial photography from flying balloons; gave public lectures, using magic lantern slides, with the title Balloons and Ballooning, Upward and Onwards), (d. 1892).
