= 1873 in animation =

- Years in animation: 1870 1871 1872 1873 1874 1875 1876
- Centuries: 18th century · 19th century · 20th century
- Decades: 1840s 1850s 1860s 1870s 1880s 1890s 1900s
- Years: 1870 1871 1872 1873 1874 1875 1876

Events in 1873 in animation.

== Events ==
- December: The pioneer animator Charles-Émile Reynaud starts holding free magic lantern shows in the style of François-Napoléon-Marie Moigno. Reynaud had previously worked as an assistant of Moigno.
- Specific date unknown: In 1873, Leland Stanford approached Eadweard Muybridge and instructed him to photograph Stanford's favorite trotter Occident in action. Initially, Muybridge believed it was impossible to get a good picture of a horse at full speed. He knew of only a few examples of instantaneous photography made in London and Paris, that depicted street scenes. These were made in very practical conditions, with subjects moving towards the camera no faster than the ordinary walk of a man, in which the legs had not been essayed at all. He explained that photography simply had not yet advanced far enough to record a horse flashing by the camera. Stanford insisted, and Muybridge agreed to try. The first experiments were executed over several days. To create the needed bright backdrop, white sheets were collected and Occident was trained to walk past them without flinching. Then more sheets were gathered to lay over the ground, so the legs would be clearly visible, and Occident was trained to walk over them. Muybridge developed a spring-activated shutter system, leaving an opening of 1/8 of an inch, and in the end, managed to reduce the shutter speed to a reported 1/500th of a second. Nonetheless, the best result was a very blurry and shadowy image of the trotting horse. Muybridge was far from satisfied with the result, but to his surprise, Stanford reacted very enthusiastically after carefully studying the foggy outlines of the legs in the picture. Although Stanford agreed that the photograph was not successful regarding image quality, it was satisfactory as proof of his theory about the horse's motions. Most of the previous depictions and descriptions had indeed been wrong. Before leaving his customer, Muybridge promised to concentrate his thoughts on coming up with a faster photographic process for the project. Although Stanford later claimed he did not contemplate publishing the results, the local press was informed and it was hailed as a triumph in photography by The Daily Alta California. This was the start of Muybridge's experiments with chronophotography, an important step in the development of motion pictures.

== Births ==
=== September ===
- September 3: Charles Allan Gilbert, American animator, illustrator, and World War I-era camouflage artist, (pioneer of silhouette animation, worked for John R. Bray on the production of a series of moving shadow plays called Silhouette Fantasies. These Art Nouveau-styled films, which were made by combining filmed silhouettes with pen-and-ink components, were serious interpretations of Greek myths), (d. 1929).

=== Specific date unknown ===
- Willis Robards, American actor, film director, and film producer (producer for the animated film series Mutt and Jeff), (d. 1921).

== Sources ==
- Bachman, Gregg; Slater, Thomas J., eds. (2002). American Silent Film: Discovering Marginalized Voices. Carbondale: South Illinois University. pp. 261–262.
- Bendazzi, Giannalberto (1994). Cartoons: One hundred years of cinema animation. Indiana University Press. ISBN 0253209374.
- Crafton, Donald (1993). Before Mickey: The Animated Film 1898-1928. University of Chicago Press.
- Myrent, Glenn (1989). "Emile Reynaud: First Motion Picture Cartoonist". Film History. 3 (3). Indiana University Press: 191–202. doi:10.2307/3814977. JSTOR 3814977.
