= 1860 in animation =

Events in 1860 in animation.

== Events ==
- February 27: Peter Hubert Desvignes received British patent no. 537 for 28 monocular and stereoscopic variations of cylindrical stroboscopic devices, much like the later zoetrope. His devices included a version that used an endless band of pictures running between two spools which was intermittently lit by an electric spark. Desvignes' Mimoscope later received an honourable mention "for ingenuity of construction" at the 1862 International Exhibition in London. It could "exhibit drawings, models, single or stereoscopic photographs, so as to animate animal movements, or that of machinery, showing various other illusions."
- Specific date unknown:
  - John Herschel envisioned the stereoscopic representation of scenes in action. He figured that photography could already, or would soon be able to take snapshots in one tenth of a second and that a mechanism was possible "by which a prepared plate may be presented, focused, impressed, displaced, secured in the dark, and replaced by another within two or three tenths of a second". Apparently without knowledge of previous developments in the field, Herschel believed the "phenakistoscope" (sic) could very well be adapted into a viewer for stereoscopic motion photography pairs. He also had high hopes for the development of colour photography, since he himself had already obtained promising results.
  - By 1860, the Massachusetts-based chemist and businessman John Fallon improved a large biunial magic lantern, imported from England, and named it 'stereopticon'. The device was a slide projector with two lenses, usually one above the other, and has since been used to project photographic images. In comparison to regular magic lanters, the stereopticons added more powerful light sources to optimize the projection of photographic slides.
  - Through the mid-19th century, the market for magic lanterns was concentrated in Europe, with production focused primarily on Italy, France, and England. By 1860, however, mass production began to make magic lanterns more widely available and affordable. Much of the production in the latter half of the 19th century concentrated in Germany. These smaller lanterns had smaller glass sliders, which instead of wooden frames usually had colorful strips of paper glued around their edges. Their images were printed directly on the glass.

== Births ==
=== August ===
- August 5: Louis Wain, English artist (Wain made a short-lived venture into film animation, drawing the first ever screen cartoon cat, "Pussyfoot". His cartoons were not a cinema success), (d. 1939).
