= John Arthur Roebuck Rudge =

British scientific inventor (1837–1903)

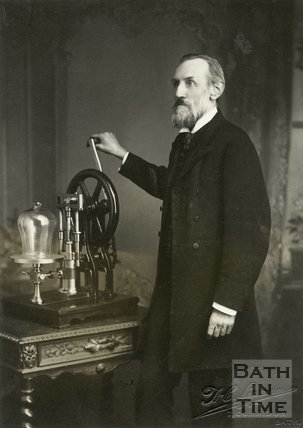

John Arthur Roebuck Rudge (26 July 1837 – 3 January 1903) was a British scientific instrument maker and inventor, who lived in Bath, noted for his contributions to the development of moving pictures. He collaborated with William Friese-Greene and, around 1880, he invented a device known as the Biophantic Lantern. This rotated seven square slides around a circular lamp housing, using a movement similar to the Maltese Cross, later found in many film projectors. The light was obscured between images via a pair of ground glass shutters. The only surviving sequence – likely the only one ever made – shows Rudge taking off his own head and putting it under his arm. The trick was carried out by Friese-Greene playing the body.

Over the following decade Rudge came up with a series of magic lantern experiments to try to recreate movement, calling all of these 'Biophantoscopes'. All employed individually posed photographs, rather than images taken with a moving picture camera, and featured changing faces.

== See also ==
- Choreutoscope
