= Display device =

Output device for presentation of information in visual form

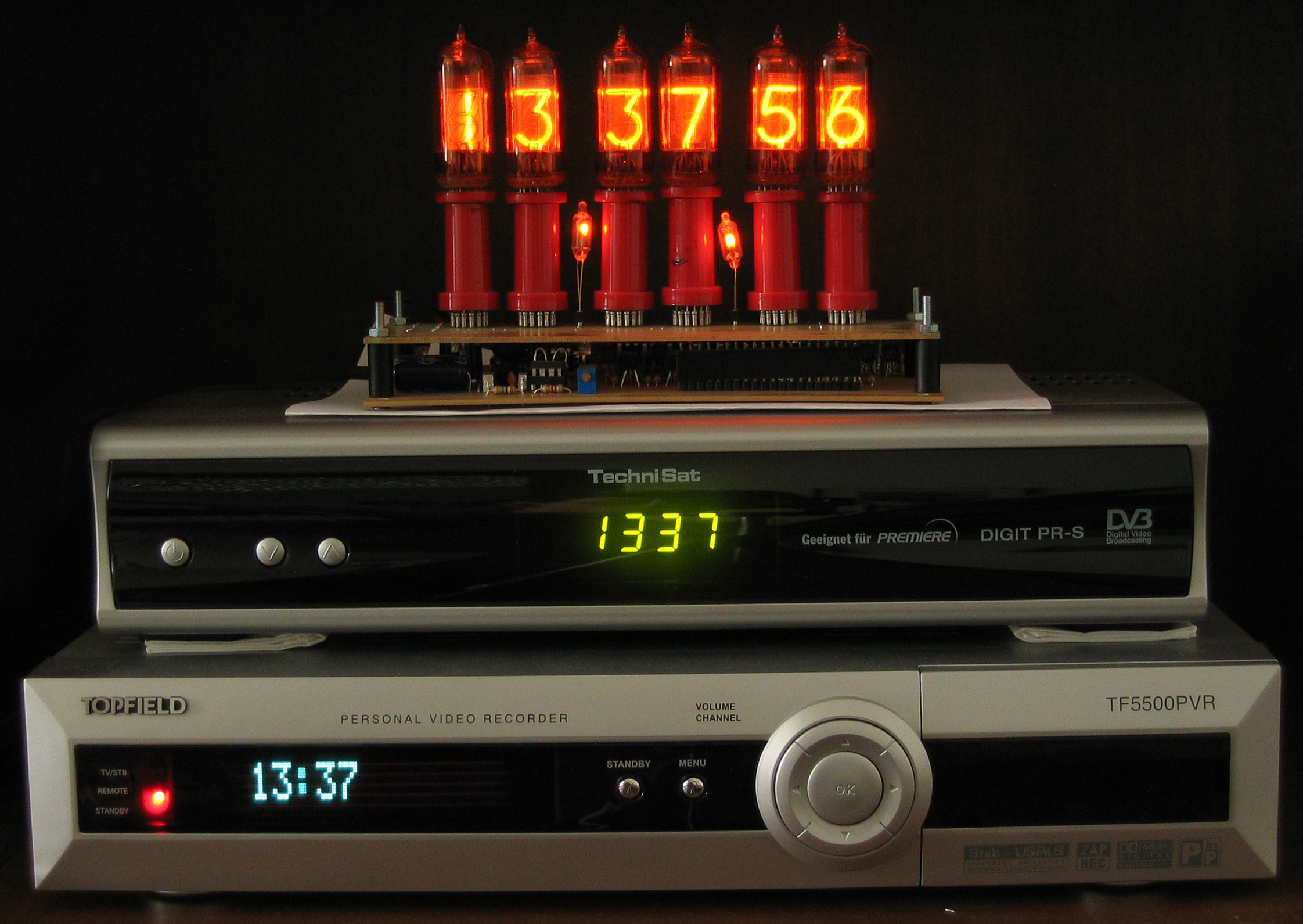
Nixie tubes, LED display and VF display, top to bottom

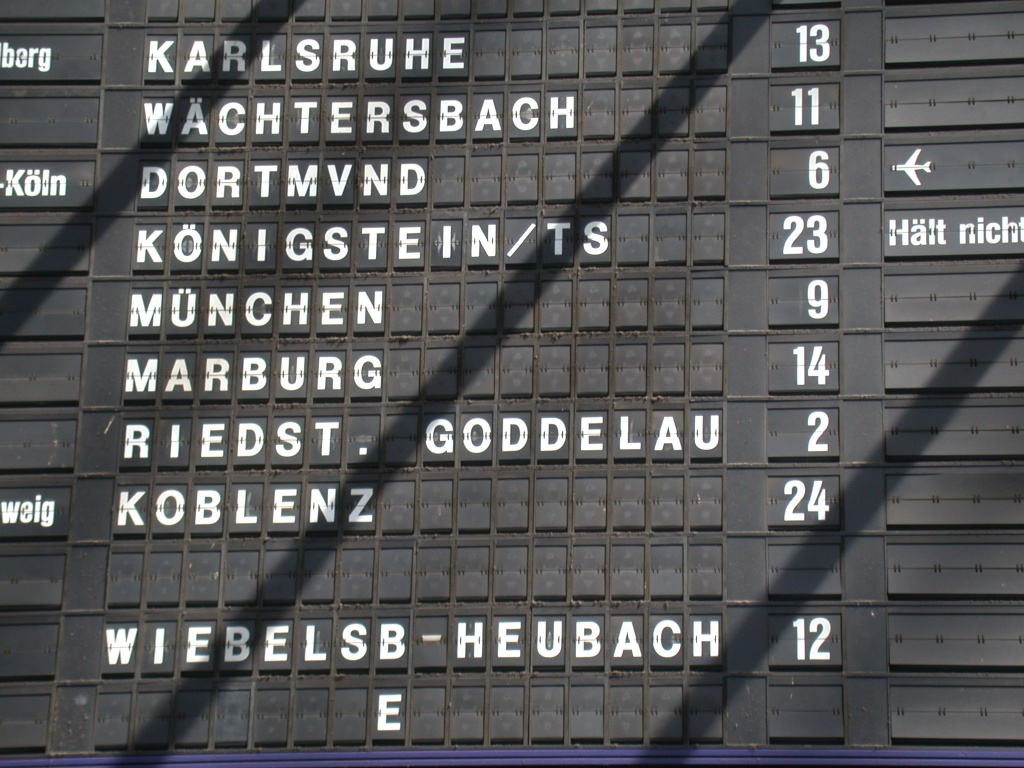
Display board at Frankfurt (Main) Hauptbahnhof (2005)

A display device is an output device for presentation of information in visual or tactile form (the latter used for example in tactile electronic displays for blind people). When the input information that is supplied has an electrical signal the display is called an electronic display.

Common applications for electronic visual displays are television sets or computer monitors.

== Types of electronic displays ==
=== In use ===
These are the technologies used to create the various displays in use today.

- Liquid-crystal display (LCD)
  - Light-emitting diode (LED) backlit LCD
  - Thin-film transistor (TFT) LCD
  - Quantum dot (QLED) display
- Light-emitting diode (LED) display
  - OLED display
  - AMOLED display
  - Super AMOLED display

==== Segment displays ====
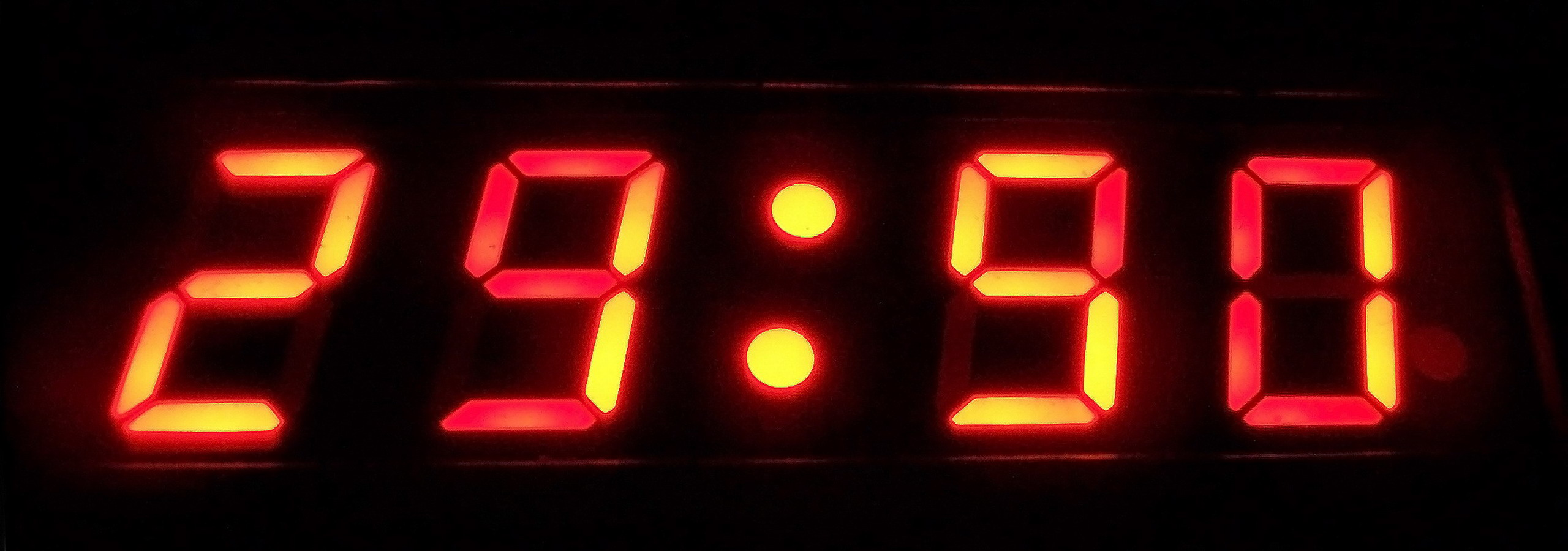
Digital clocks display changing numerals

The common segment displays shown side by side: 7-segment, 9-segment, 14-segment and 16-segment displays

Some displays can show only digits or alphanumeric characters. They are called segment displays, because they are composed of several segments that switch on and off to give appearance of desired glyph. The segments are usually single LEDs or liquid crystals. They are mostly used in digital watches and pocket calculators. Common types are seven-segment displays which are used for numerals only, and alphanumeric fourteen-segment displays and sixteen-segment displays which can display numerals and Roman alphabet letters.

=== Other types ===
- Vacuum fluorescent display
- Electroluminescent (ELD) display
- Plasma (PDP) display
- Laser-powered phosphor display

Cathode-ray tubes were also formerly widely used.

==== Full-area 2-dimensional displays ====
2-dimensional displays that cover a full area (usually a rectangle) are also called video displays, since it is the main modality of presenting video.

===== Applications of full-area 2-dimensional displays =====
Full-area 2-dimensional displays are used in, for example:

- Television set
- Computer monitor
- Head-mounted displays, Heads-up displays and Virtual reality headsets
- Broadcast reference monitor - Industry/non-common consumer directed hardware/equipment.
- Medical monitors
- Mobile displays (for mobile devices)
- Smartphone displays (for smartphones)
- Video walls

===== Underlying technologies of full-area 2-dimensional displays =====
Underlying technologies for full-area 2-dimensional displays include:

- Cathode-ray tube display (CRT)
- Light-emitting diode display (LED)
- Electroluminescent display (ELD)
- Electronic paper, E Ink
- Plasma display panel (PDP)
- Liquid-crystal display (LCD)
  - High-performance addressing display (HPA)
  - Thin-film transistor display (TFT)
- Organic light-emitting diode display (OLED)
- Digital Light Processing display (DLP)
- Surface-conduction electron-emitter display (SED) (experimental)
- Field-emission display (FED) (experimental)
- Laser TV (forthcoming)
- Carbon nanotubes (experimental)
- Quantum dot display (QLED)
- Interferometric modulator display (IMOD)
- Digital microshutter display (DMS)
- microLED (in development)

The multiplexed display technique is used to drive most display devices.

==== Three-dimensional displays ====
- Swept-volume display
- Laser display
- Holographic display
- Light field displays
- Andotrope

== Mechanical types ==
- Ticker tape (historical)
- Split-flap display (or simply flap display)
- Flip-disc display (or flip-dot display)
- Vane display
- Rollsign
- Tactile electronic displays are usually intended for the blind. They use electro-mechanical parts to dynamically update a tactile image (usually of text) so that the image may be felt by the fingers.
  - Optacon, using metal rods instead of light in order to convey images to blind people by tactile sensation.

== See also ==
- Comparison of CRT, LCD, plasma, and OLED displays
- Graphical user interfaces
- History of display technology
- User interface
- Input device
- Text display
