= Joshua Spodek =

American leadership coach and environmentalist

- Born: 1971 (age 54–55); Philadelphia, Pennsylvania
- Education: Columbia University; BA, master's, and PhD in physics
- Occupations: Leadership coach; environmentalist; astrophysicist
- Parent: Howard Spodek (father)
- Website: https://joshuaspodek.com/

Joshua Spodek (born 1971) is an American leadership coach, environmentalist, and astrophysicist. He hosts the podcast This Sustainable Life. He is also an adjunct professor of leadership at New York University and a 4-time TEDx speaker.

== Early life and education ==
Spodek was born and raised in Philadelphia, Pennsylvania. His father, Howard Spodek, was a world historian and professor of history at Temple University.

He attended Columbia University, where he completed his Bachelor of Arts in Physics in 1993, a Master’s degree in Physics in 1996, a Master of Philosophy in Physics in 1998, his Ph.D. in Astrophysics in 1999, and an MBA in 2006 (studied under a Nobel Laureate).

== Career ==
In 1999, Spodek invented a technology with a class of linear zoetropes to show motion pictures to passengers in subways moving between stations. As an astrophysics graduate student, his design debuted in September 2001 in the Atlanta subway system tunnel, showcased to riders moving past. Spodek co-founded a company called Submedia with his friend Matthew Gross to market this technology. Submedia installed displays on four continents.

In 2001, he helped build the X-ray observational satellite XMM-Newton with the European Space Agency and NASA.

In 2014, his first experiment of avoiding packaged food for a week reduced emptying his household trash from weekly to less than annually, and he hasn’t flown since 2016.

Since 2021, he has unplugged his refrigerator, inspired by other cultures on how to refrigerate less with less waste and with healthier diets. He disconnected his apartment in Greenwich Village, Manhattan, from the electric grid in May 2022.

He has been living sustainably in Manhattan to enable his sustainability leadership work. He last ate meat in 1990, eventually becoming vegan.

He currently teaches leadership and entrepreneurship at NYU and has spoken and led seminars and workshops in leadership and entrepreneurship at Harvard University, Princeton University, MIT, INSEAD (Singapore), the New York Academy of Sciences, and corporations including Google, PwC, Boston Consulting Group, S&P, IBM, and more.

Spodek talks with leaders to lead cultural change in sustainability on his podcast, This Sustainable Life, originally called "Leadership and the Environment". His podcast guests include Dan Pink, Marshall Goldsmith, Frances Hesselbein, Elizabeth Kolbert, and many more.

== Bibliography ==
- Leadership Step by Step: Become the Person Others Follow (2017)
- Sustainability Simplified: The Definitive Guide to Understanding and Solving All (Yes, All) Our Environmental Problems (2024)

== Recognition ==
Spodek was named “best and brightest” in Esquire’s Genius issue. He was described as an “astrophysicist turned new media whiz” by NBC. He received the Dean’s Faculty Teaching and Learning Innovation Scholar Grant, NYU School of Professional Studies (NYUSPS) for the academic year 2019-2020.

== Personal ==
Spodek lives in New York City. He visited North Korea twice and swam across the Hudson River twice.

He has maintained a burpee-based calisthenic routine daily since 2007. He posts daily to his blog.

== See also ==
- Zoetropes
- Sustainable Living
- Environmentalist
- Leadership
- Astrophysics
