= Ding Huan =

1st-century Chinese engineer during the Han Dynasty

Ding Huan (Chinese: 丁緩) was a Chinese craftsman, mechanical engineer, and inventor who lived in the first century CE during the Han dynasty. Among the inventions attributed to him is an air conditioning system based on evaporative cooling.

== Purported invention of the zoetrope ==
In his multi-volume Science and Civilisation in China, the British scientist and historian Joseph Needham briefly describes several devices he classes as "... a variety of zoetrope, which may well have originated in China". The first example he offers used an umbrella-like canopy hung over an oil lamp and provided with a vaned opening at its top, so that heated air rising from the lamp would cause it to rotate. The lower part of the canopy was in the form of a cylinder and had translucent panes with paintings of animals or men. Sufficiently rapid rotation would "give an impression of movement" to the painted figures. Several later writers have misreported Needham by crediting this particular device to Ding Huan. The only such invention Needham attributes to Ding Huan is "a 'nine-storied hill-censer' ... on which many strange birds and mysterious animals were attached. All ... moved quite naturally ... presumably as soon as the lamp was lit."

Needham claims these devices "certainly embodied the principle of a rapid succession of images", but it is not apparent from any of the descriptions provided that there was anything other than a procession of painted figures or carvings or cast shadows seen actually moving through space. By contrast, the invention for which the name "zoetrope" was coined in the 19th century is, like the phenakistiscope and the flip book, an animation device that creates an illusion of motion from a series of images showing successive phases of that motion, by rapidly presenting them to the viewer one after another in such a way that each abruptly replaces (or seems to abruptly replace) the previous one.
