= 1866 in animation =

Events in 1866 in animation.

== Events ==
- July 27: The inventor William Ensign Lincoln applied for a U.S. patent for his zoetrope, as an assignor to the board game manufacturing company Milton Bradley and Co.. The patent was granted to him in April 1867. Lincoln had invented the definitive version of the zoetrope in 1865, when he was about 18 years old and a sophomore at the Brown University in Providence, Rhode Island. Lincoln's patented version had the viewing slits on a level above the pictures, which allowed the use of easily replaceable strips of images. It also had an illustrated paper disc on the base, which was not always exploited on the commercially produced versions. On the advice of a local bookstore owner, Lincoln had sent a model to Milton Bradley and Co. in an attempt to market the animation device.
- December: The zoetrope is advertised in American newspapers by various shop owners.
- Specific date unknown:
  - The photographer William Pumphrey organised an exhibition of Yorkshire Fine Art and Industry, in the grounds of the Bootham Park Hospital. Pumphrey himself introduced an exhibit of two revolving stereoscopes, each containing 50 of his stereo views.
  - In 1866, the French instrument maker and inventor Jules Duboscq demonstrated an early version of the overhead projector. The device is used as an improvement over the magic lantern projector.
  - In 1866, the English scientist Charles Wheatstone invented the Eidotrope: counter-rotating discs of perforated metal or card (or wire gauze or lace), producing swirling Moiré patterns of bright white dots.
  - Around 1866, the Choreutoscope was invented by the Greenwich engineer Lionel Smith Beale and demonstrated at the Royal Polytechnic. It projected six pictures from a long slide and used a hand-cranked mechanism for intermittent movement of the slide and synchronized shutter action. The mechanism became a key to the development of the movie camera and projector. The Choreutoscope was used at the first professional public demonstration of the Kinetoscope to explain its principles.

== Births ==
=== April ===
- April 23: Willie Riley, English novelist, (Riley had a career in the sale of magic lantern slides and relevant equipment until 1914, when, with the onset of World War I, his family's company failed. Riley then developed a second career as a professional writer), (d. 1961).

=== November ===
- November 22: Anna Caulfield McKnight, American traveler, lecturer on art and travel, and businesswoman, (her lectures used magic lantern slides which were taken on her travels, and made her a well-known lecturer in her time), (d. 1947).
