= Moses Holden =

English astronomer

Moses Holden (21 November 1777 – 3 June 1864) was an English astronomer, known particularly for giving magic lantern lectures on astronomy.

== Life ==
Holden was born in Bolton, Lancashire, the second youngest of five children of Thomas Holden, a handloom weaver, and his wife Joyce. As a youth he worked in a foundry at Preston, until disabled by an accident. On his recovery he worked as a landscape gardener. From early in life he possessed a love of astronomy; he collected a library, and gave talks on the subject.

In 1814–15 he constructed a large orrery and a magic lantern, made to illustrate his astronomical lectures. These were first given in the Theatre Royal, Preston, in 1815, and then in many towns in the north of England; their success led to his touring throughout Northern England to give lectures. He lectured at the Theatre Royal, Nottingham, in 1817. In 1826 he devoted the proceeds of one of his lectures to the erection of a monument in St. Michael's Church, Toxteth Park, Liverpool, to the memory of the astronomer Jeremiah Horrocks.

In 1818 Holden published A small Celestial Atlas, or Maps of the Visible Heavens, in the Latitude of Britain, (3rd edition 1834, 4th edition 1840). It was one of the earliest works of the kind published at a low price. He also compiled an almanac, published in 1835 and later. He made several microscopes, and made a telescope for Rev William Carus Wilson.

He settled in Preston in 1828, where he gave courses on astronomy until 1852. He assisted in establishing the Preston Institution for the Diffusion of Knowledge, the predecessor of the University of Central Lancashire. He was recognised as a key founder in 2017 with the construction and dedication to him of the Moses Holden Memorial Telescope, along with the Moses Holden Bursary provided by Dr Patrick B. Holden, his three-times grandson. From 1837 he was an enthusiastic member of the British Association for the Advancement of Science. In 1834 the Freedom of the Borough of Preston was conferred on him. Holden died at his home in Jordan Street, Preston on 3 June 1864, aged 86.
