= Bill Brand (film artist) =

American experimental film and video artist

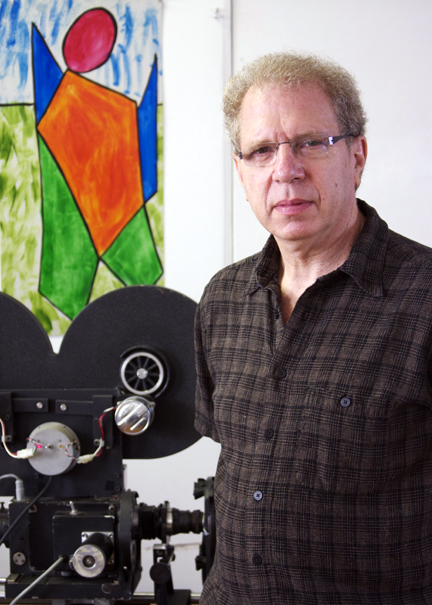
- Bill Brand in 2011
- Born: 1949 (age 76–77); Rochester, New York
- Occupations: Experimental film and video artist, educator, activist, film preservationist

Bill Brand (born 1949, in Rochester, New York) is an experimental film and video artist, educator, activist and film preservationist.

== Life and career ==
Brand's films and videos were first shown at Anthology Film Archives in New York City in 1973. They have since been screened in the United States and around the world in museums, independent film showcases, colleges and universities, and on television. They have been featured at major film festivals including the Berlin International Film Festival, New Directors/New Films Festival, Tribeca Film Festival and Rotterdam Film Festival.

== Masstransiscope ==
The Masstransiscope artwork

In 1980 Brand completed a permanent public art project, Masstransiscope, a mural installed in the subway tunnel of New York City that is animated by the movement of passing trains. Masstransiscope was awarded a certificate of merit by the New York City Municipal Art Society in 1982. In disrepair for over 20 years, Masstransiscope was restored in 2008 and brought into the permanent collection of the MTA Arts for Transit program. The piece was named among the top 40 public art works in America for 2009 by the Public Art Network.

Masstransiscope was again covered by graffiti during the complete subway shutdown during Hurricane Sandy and again restored after that.

== Academic and commercial service ==
Brand lives in New York City and is professor of film and photography at Hampshire College in Amherst, Massachusetts. He also teaches film preservation at Moving Image Archiving and Preservation graduate program at Tisch School of the Arts. Since 1976, he has operated BB Optics, an optical printing service specializing in 8 mm blow-ups and archival preservation for independent filmmakers, libraries, museums and archives. In 2006, he was named an Anthology Film Archives film preservation honoree and given a month-long retrospective to celebrate BB Optics' 30th anniversary.

== Reception ==
=== In film books ===
The work of Brand is discussed in histories of cinema including the books They Must Be Represented (1996) by Paula Rabinowitz, Documentary, A History of the Non-Fiction Film, (1992) by Erik Barnouw, Allegories of Cinema, (1990) by David James and in a chapter by Robin Blaetz titled Avant-Garde Cinema of the Seventies in Lost Illusions, American Cinema in the Shadow of Watergate and Vietnam 1970–1979 by David Cook.

=== In the press ===
Brand's work has also been written about in news and journal articles by Janet Maslin, Paul Arthur, J. Hoberman, B. Ruby Rich, Noël Carroll, Brian Frye and Randy Kennedy among others.
