= Alexander Black (photographer) =

American photographer (1859–1940)

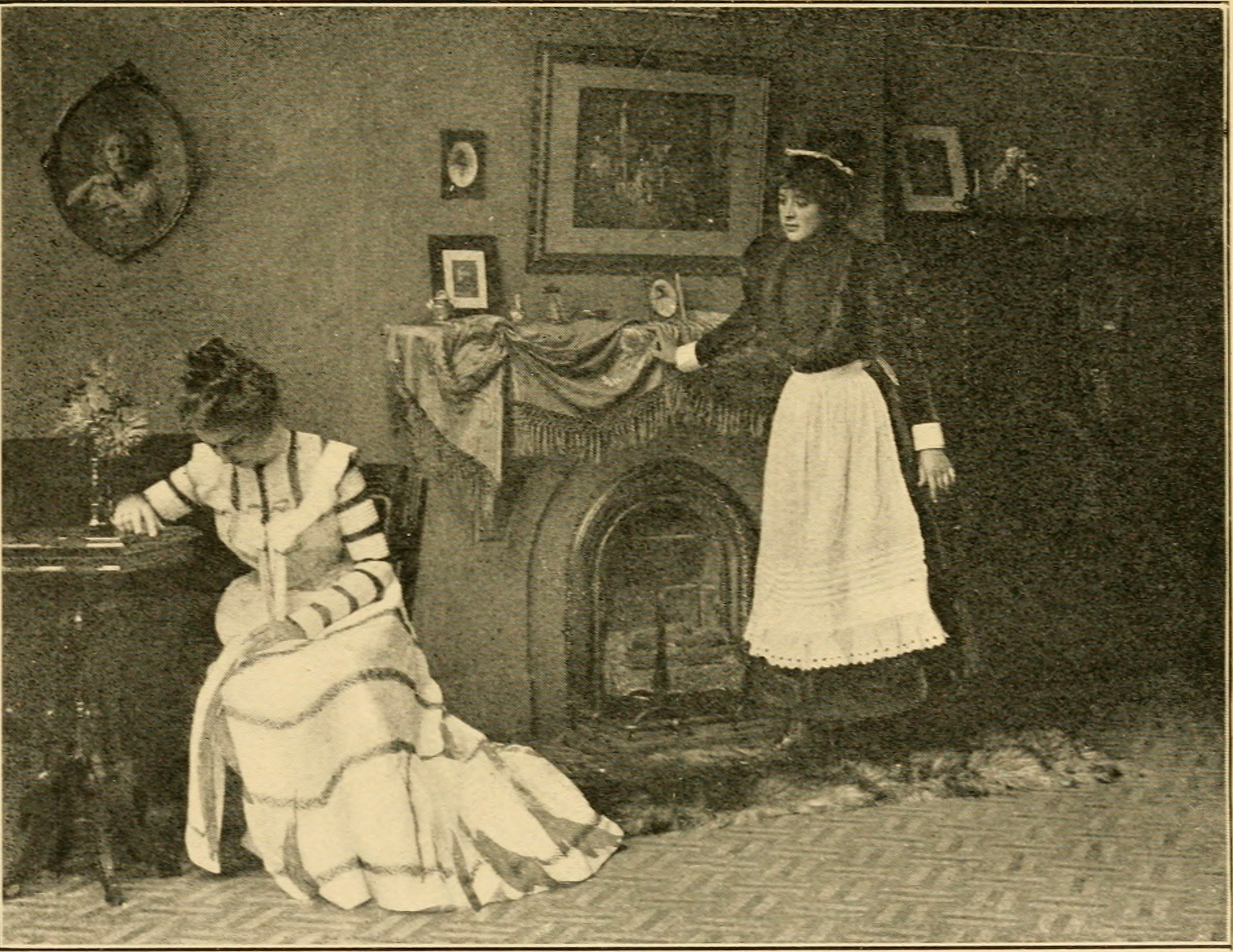
Image from "The Girl and the Guardsman" Picture Play by Alexander Black

Alexander Black (1859–1940) was an American author, photographer, newspaper man, and the inventor of the pre-cinema “Picture Play” which debuted in 1894.

== Early life ==
Alexander Black was born in New York City in 1859, the eldest child of Peter Black and Sarah MacCrae, both born in Scotland. After a grammar school education and teaching himself printmaking, became a reporter at the Brooklyn Eagle. In 1878 at the age 19 he toured Europe for three months keeping a detailed sketchbook.

== Career ==
Black's career began as a newspaper man in Brooklyn and stenographer for Brooklyn courts, working at the Brooklyn Daily Eagle starting in 1870, editor of the Brooklyn Times (1885–1905), New York World (1905–1910), Frank Seaman, Inc. (1910–1913), Newspaper Feature Service (1913–1926), and as art editor for King Features Syndicate (1926–1935), alongside freelance writing and photography. During this time he also became the first president of the department of photography at the Brooklyn Institute of Arts and Sciences in 1886. His first book was published in 1886 titled Photography Indoors and Out, intended to be a manual for amateur photographers.

On the lyceum circuit, Black presented a magic lantern show of candid photography called "Life through a Detective Camera" (alternately titled "Ourselves as Others See Us") in 1889. Inspired by audience responses to these lectures, as well as emerging work by Eadward Muybridge capturing the effect of motion in photography, Black began to develop a plan to bring fiction to life through dissolving slides.

Over the summer of 1894, he wrote and photographed his first "Picture Play" titled Miss Jerry at Carbon Studio at 5 West 16th Street, New York. The finished work debuted before a live audience on October 9, 1894 at Carbon Studio, featuring a "slow movie" composed of over one hundred glass slide photographs of posed motion, accompanied by a feature-length script.

== The Picture Play (See Miss Jerry) ==
“Primarily my purpose was to illustrate art with life” - Alexander Black

Starring the actress Blanche Bayliss, the first Picture Play Miss Jerry told the story of a girl reporter in Brooklyn, with indoor scenes shot on a set created at Carbon Studios, and outdoor scenes on location in New York.

"While the motion picture was progressing with mincing steps in the peep show Edison Kinetoscope the sheer force of the evolution of expression presented the world with an interesting paradox – the birth of the photoplay upon the screen. . . Black arrived at a rate of four slides a minute for his presentation..." - A Million and One Nights author Terry Ramsaye

For the debut, Black read the scripted lines for all of the characters. Slides were dissolved using a double "magic" lantern, allowing the appearance of characters moving against a fixed background, at a rate of one approximately every 15 seconds.

Miss Jerry was well received at the time, and Black went on to create and tour with two more Picture Plays, A Capital Courtship (1896) and The Girl and the Guardsman (1899).

Partial collections of slides related to the original Picture Plays are stored at Princeton University and in private collections. No known intact set is known to have survived.

== Later career and legacy ==
In the years following the Picture Play, Black went on to become a popular novelist, publishing several books into the 1930s, including adaptations of his three Picture Plays. He also continued to experiment with photography and film, creating several home made 16mm films featuring special effects and titles.

Beginning in 1910, early film historians began to credit Black with his role in the development of motion picture. The significance of his work was not in the technical effect of motion, but in the presentation of a full length narrative on the screen, rather than a peep show, and in the development of what would later be known as a screenplay.

In 2009, film historian Kaveh Askari and the Black family collaborated with the Pacific Film Archive in Berkeley, California to preserve and archive several of Black’s original 16mm films, and screened them in November 2009.

Existing collections of photographs, related papers, and films are now with Black Family in California, at the Pacific Film Archive, St Lawrence University, Princeton University, and the NY Public Archive.

== Filmography ==
- The Story of Ohio, 1888, D Lothrop Co, Boston
- Photography Indoors and Out, 1894 Houghton, Mifflin and Company
- (Editor) A History of the City of Brooklyn and Kings County, 1894, Brooklyn, published by subscription
- Miss Jerry, 1895, Charles Scribner's Sons
- A Capitol Courtship, 1897, Charles Scribner's Sons
- The Great Desire, 1919, Harper & Brothers Publishers, New York
- Miss America; Pen and Camera Sketches of the American Girl, 1898, Charles Scribner's Sons
- Captain Kodak; A Camera Story, 1899, D Lothrop Co, Boston
- The Girl and the Guardsman, 1900, Charles Scribner's Sons
- Richard Gordon, 1902
- Thorney, 1913
- The Great Desire, 1919, Harper & Brothers Publishers, New York
- The Seventh Angel, 1921, Harper & Brothers Publishers, New York
- The Latest Thing and Other Things, 1922, Harper & Brothers Publishers, New York
- Jo Ellen, 1923
- Stacey, 1925
- American Husbands and Other Alternatives, 1925, Bobbs-Merrill
- Time and Chance; Adventures with People and Print, 1937

== Sources ==
- Alexander Black at Who's Who of Victorian Cinema
- Black, Alexander (1937) Time and Chance: Adventures with People and Print. Farrar & Rinehart, New York.
- Ramsaye, Terry (1926) A Million and One Nights: A History of the Motion Picture. Simon & Schuster, New York.
- Askari, Kaveh (2015) Making Movies into Art: Picture Craft from the Magic Lantern to Early Hollywood (Cultural Histories of Cinema). British Film Institute. ISBN 978-1844576951
- Fell, John L. (1984) Film Before Griffith. University of California Press. 978-0520047587
- Kaveh Askari, Carlyle H. Black II, John Shibata, "Alexander Black. Cinema Pioneer" (Pacific Film Archive, 22 November 2009)
