= Andotrope =

Viewing device

An Andotrope is a device that allows viewing of a two-dimensional video from any direction, without limiting it to a specific perspective as with conventional screens.

== Name and idea ==
The device is named after its inventor, Mike Ando, with the suffix -trope (Ancient Greek τρόπος, "turning"). The idea came to Ando in 2022 while working on a project for Mysterium 2023 to recreate Gehn’s Holographic Imager from the computer game Riven – The Sequel to Myst. The Andotrope is a replica of this device, but differs from a technical perspective in that the image is not a three-dimensional hologram.

== Functionality ==
According to Ando, the device updates "a 150-year-old children’s toy into the 21st century.” The functionality of an Andotrope is similar to a Zoetrope, but differs technically on several key points.

The device is built from a cylindrical housing containing at least one fixed screen. The cylinder has a slot for each screen that allows it to be viewed from outside. When at least two screens are used, the content must be synchronized to show the same image at the same time. This case is attached to a rotating electric turntable to create the stroboscopic effect of a film projector, whereby a linear sequence of images becomes a fluid video. Ando states that his device can reach 1200 revolutions per minute, and with two screens, can show a video at approximately 40 frames per second.

According to Ando, important requirements for the screens are:

- No flickering
- High brightness
- Strong resistance (due to high rotation speed)

== Andotrope in the media ==
The invention was met with a generally positive reception. For example, the Australian Diyode Magazine published an interview with Ando covering the device and process of its invention. The German magazine Coolsten also covered the Andotrope. The YouTube channel The Action Lab released a video in November 2024 covering the use of 3D printing and two smartphones in creating its own Andotrope.
