= Choreutoscope =

The choreutoscope (pronounced cory-ute-o-scope, based on ancient Greek, meaning 'dancer viewer') is a late 19th century type of magic lantern slide designed to project moving images, with a hand-cranked mechanism intermittently pulling six depictions of phases of a movement in front of the lens. It has been regarded as one of the first intermittent transportation mechanisms for projected images, resembling those of later cinematographic cameras and projectors.

A typical subject was the 'dancing skeleton' (or Danse Macabre).

== History ==
In 1869, O.B. Brown received a U.S. patent for an optical instrument that used a Geneva drive mechanism for the intermittent projection of sequential images from a rotating disc.

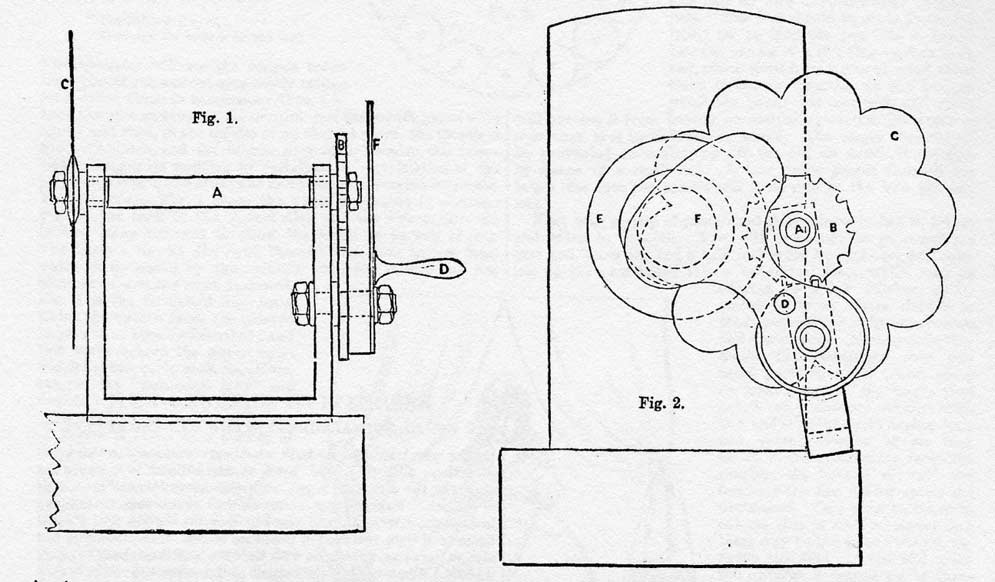
John Beale's mechanism for The Dancing Skeleton (1870)

In 1870, "The Popular Educator" featured an article about a very similar instrument (with an "intermittent motion-piece"), produced by Greenwich engineer John Beale. It produced an illusion called "The Dancing Skeleton" and projected the figure of a skeleton in various positions, cut through an aluminium disc (constituting lines from stencils), while an "interceptor" (shutter) cuts off the light during the movement of the disc between images. An earlier article in the book described Beale's related "Automated Picture" or "automatic face apparatus". This had a bust of a young lady painted on a screen, with a hole in place of the face filled in with a mechanically randomised succession of 16 different facial expressions painted on a rotating paper disc. A slotted "interceptor" disc with 8 apertures in front of a lantern produced flashes of light to illuminate the pictures when they were in place, inducing the impression of movements of eyes, mouth and tongue. Early British film historian Will Day claimed that Beale's choreutoscope had already been invented in 1866.

Commercial versions of Beale's Choreutoscope were produced by optical equipment and magic lantern firm Charles Baker in London, by 1875. It had six pictures on a glass slide, moved intermittently together with a shutter by a cam mechanism.

Rather than small changes between successive phases known from stroboscopic animation devices like the phenakistiscope and the zoetrope, pictures for Beale's devices feature bigger and random differences, producing a very jerky and limited type of beta movement.

William C. Hughes created a version of the choreutoscope in 1884.
