= Edwin George Lutz =

American artist and author

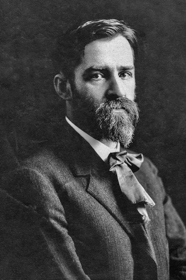
- Edwin George Lutz, c 1911
- Born: Edwin George Lutz; August 26, 1868; Philadelphia, Pennsylvania, U.S.
- Died: March 30, 1951 (aged 82)
- Education: Nazareth Hall; Pennsylvania Museum and School of Industrial Art; Académie Julian
- Spouse: Eleanor Ludlam Dangler (m. 1892)
- Writing career
- Notable work: Drawing Made Easy (1921), Animated Cartoons (1920)
- Website: eglutz.com

Edwin George Lutz (August 26, 1868 — March 30, 1951) was an American artist and author. As an illustrator, he contributed cartoons and human interest articles illustrated with his drawings to several magazines and newspapers. Under the name E.G. Lutz, he authored 17 books. Most were how-to manuals dealing with art and drawing techniques, but two were about aspects of the film industry, which was rapidly developing in the early years of the 20th century. One of his most popular books was Drawing Made Easy (1921), which was written for young artists. Perhaps his most influential work was Animated Cartoons (1920), the first book to describe what were then state-of-the-art animation techniques. A 19-year-old Walt Disney discovered the book at his local library and used it as a guide during his first years in his animation career.

== Life and career ==
=== Early life ===
Lutz was born August 26, 1868, in Philadelphia, Pennsylvania, to German immigrants John Martin Lutz (c. 1842–1878) and Anna Ernestine Bachman Lutz (1845 - 1879). He was the oldest of four children. His siblings were William Florence Lutz (1871–1945), Flora Johanna Lutz Wiegandt (1873–1959) and Ernest Martin Lutz (1877–1928). His parents died of tuberculosis within a year of each other, and the siblings were split up and raised by different families in 1879. Edwin and his brother William were raised on a farm in Palmyra, NJ, while Flora and Ernest grew up in the homes of aunts and uncles in the Philadelphia area.

At the age of 11, Lutz was enrolled in the boarding school Nazareth Hall, a "classical academy" where music, drawing, painting, French, Latin, and Greek were taught. When he was 17, he became a student at the Pennsylvania Museum and School of Industrial Art in Philadelphia, PA. The curriculum focused on drawing and sculpture. In this school, he studied under Thomas Eakins, a realist painter that has prominence as an important artist in American art history.

=== Marriage ===
Lutz married Eleanor Ludlam Dangler (born in 1873) in Philadelphia on June 8, 1892. Eleanor was a milliner and the owner of the Mme Eleanor Hat Co. (or Mme Eleanor Millinery) in New York, NY. Based on census records, the couple were divorced sometime between 1920 and 1930. The couple did not have children.

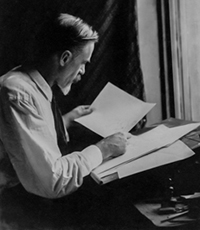
E.G. Lutz at Work, c 1918

=== Artist career ===
As a cartoonist and illustrator, Lutz met with early success and his work appeared in many newspapers and magazines, including: The Monthly Illustrator, Joseph Pulitzer's newspaper - The World, Life, Country Life, The Cosmopolitan, Century Magazine, St. Nicholas magazine, The Sun, New York Tribune, Satire (a Pulitzer periodical), The Seattle Intelligencer's Book of Magic and The Washington Times.

Many of his illustrations and cartoons included anthropomorphized animals, food, and early optical toys.

In 1900, at the age of 32, Lutz attended the Académie Julian in Paris, France, a private school for painting and sculpture.

=== Publishing career ===
Lutz published 17 books from the 1913 through 1936, under the name E.G. Lutz. His first work, What to Draw and How to Draw It, was published in 1913 by Dodd, Mead & Company. The book, which was created for the beginning drawer, consists of sequenced illustrations that provide step-by-step instructions on how to sketch figures. This book and Drawing Made Easy, published by Charles Scribner's Sons in 1921, grew out of work Lutz created for a series of newspaper articles published in The Sun in 1912.

Drawing Made Easy was Lutz's most popular book and was reprinted through the 1970s. In it, Lutz taught a method of drawing based on the technique used in French art schools in the 19th century: begin with large basic forms and progressively refine them by adding smaller shapes and detail.

At the age of 52, Lutz wrote his most influential book, Animated Cartoons - How they are made, their origin and development, (Charles Scribner's Sons, 1920). The book offered practical ideas for streamlining the production of animated drawings. While a few articles and books on animation mentioned studio practices before Animated Cartoons, this was the first book dedicated to the subject. The bookaffected the entire animation industry in the formative years of animation studios.

At the age of 19, Walt Disney borrowed Animated Cartoons from the Kansas City Library shortly after the book was published in 1920. It is well documented that Animated Cartoons greatly influenced him in his early years in animation. The book was one of the primary animation guides used by Disney's Laugh-O-Grams studio team in Kansas City, Missouri, throughout the 1920s. Referring to Animated Cartoons, Disney himself has stated that "Finding that book was one of the most important and useful events in my life."

== Bibliography ==
- What to Draw and How to Draw It – The Ideal Method (1913) Dodd, Mead & Company
- Practical Drawing – A book for the student and the general reader (1915) Charles Scribner's Sons
- Practical Art Anatomy – Structural anatomy of the human figure easily understood by ingeniously drawn diagrams (1918) Charles Scribner's Sons
- Animated Cartoons – How they are made, their origin and development (1920) Charles Scribner's Sons
- Drawing Made Easy – A helpful book for young artists (1921) Charles Scribner's Sons
- Instead of Scribbling – A guide to pencil drawing, a drawing book for young people (1924) Dodd, Mead & Company
- Practical Graphic Figures – The technical side of drawing for cartoons and fashions (1925) Charles Scribner's Sons
- Practical Pictorial Composition – A guide to the appreciation of pictures. With pen-and-ink interpretations of paintings and diagrammatic analysis by the author (1926) Charles Scribner's Sons
- The Motion-Picture Cameraman – A book for the amateur and professional cinematographer (1927) Charles Scribner's Sons
- Practical Pen Drawing – A clear presentation of pen-and-ink illustration (1928) Charles Scribner's Sons
- More Things to Draw – A sequel to Drawing Made Easy. A helpful book for young artists (1928) Charles Scribner's Sons
- Practical Art Lettering – A treatise on the construction of the symbols of the alphabet (1929) Charles Scribner's Sons
- Practical Landscape Paintings in Oils (1930) Charles Scribner's Sons
- Animal Drawing in Outline – A drawing book for young people (1931) Dodd, Mead & Company
- Practical Water-color Sketching – With specific instructions for making wash drawings in color and black and white (1931) Charles Scribner's Sons
- Practical Engraving and Etching – A book of instruction in the art of making linoleum blocks, wood-engravings, wood-cuts made on the plank, etchings and aquatints (1933) Charles Scribner's Sons
- Practical Course in Memory Drawing – For the classroom and for self-study (1936) Charles Scribner's Sons

== Sources ==
Lutz, Frank. "Illustrating Edwin". Illustrating Edwin - A Bio of Edwin G. Lutz.
