= Anna Caulfield McKnight =

American suffragist and businesswoman

Anna Caulfield McKnight (born Cascade, Michigan, November 22, 1866; died Grand Rapids, Michigan, June 18, 1947) was an American traveler, lecturer on art and travel, club woman, woman suffragist, and businesswoman. Her oratory and magic lantern slides taken on her travels made her a well-known lecturer in her time.

== Early life ==
McKnight was born the daughter of John Caulfield (1838-1919), a prosperous Irish immigrant in Grand Rapids, Michigan, and his wife Esther Egan (1844-1923). The oldest of seven children, she was educated at Sacred Heart Academy in Detroit and the "Harvard Annex" (soon to be Radcliffe College) in Cambridge, Massachusetts. At the Harvard Annex she studied art history with scholar Charles Eliot Norton, who encouraged her to study in Europe. In 1892 she left for Europe, where she studied with archaeologist Giovanni Battista de Rossi and spent four years travelling.

== Early lectures ==
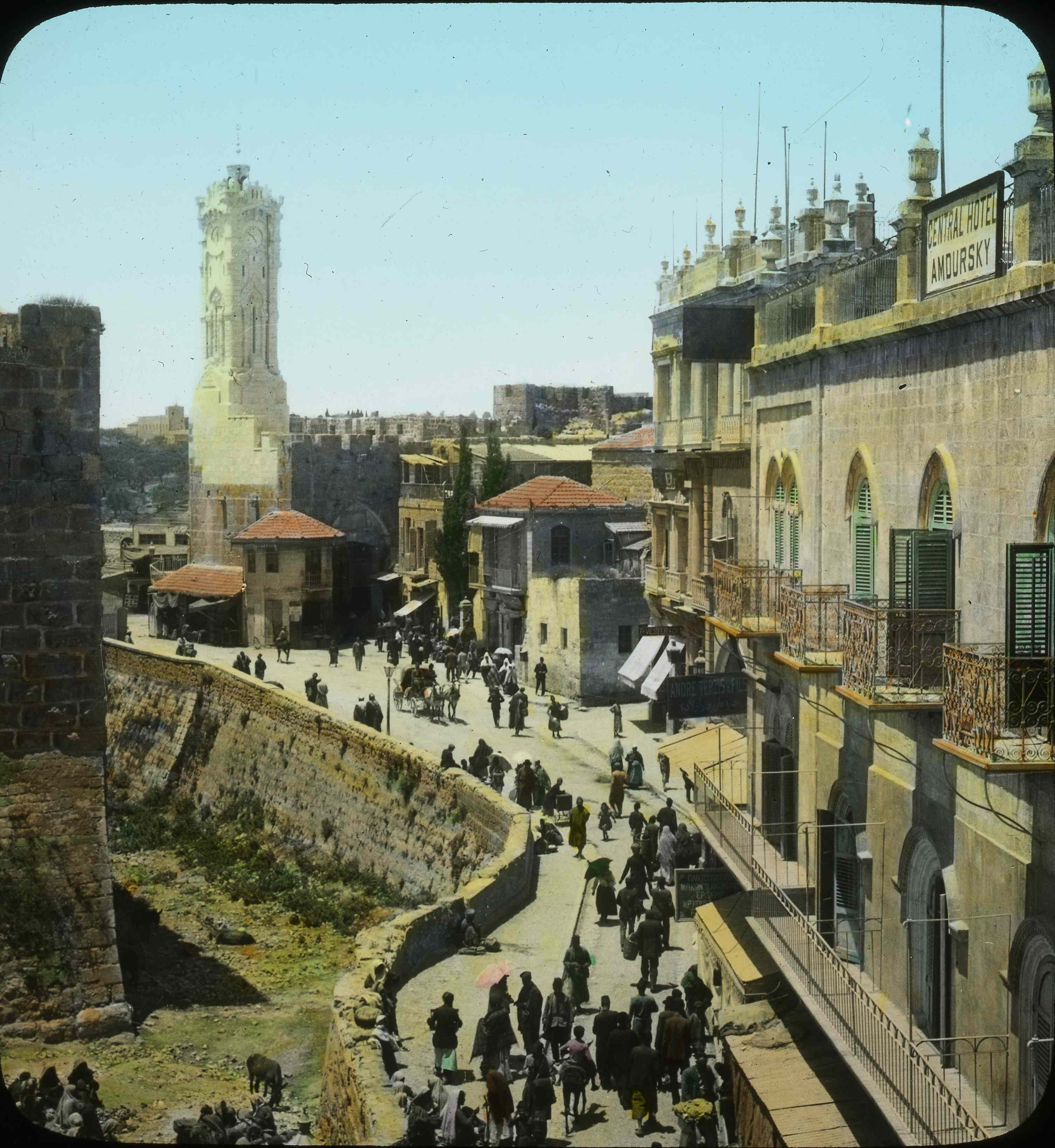
One of McKnight's colored lantern slides: Jaffa Gate, 1910

Anna gave her first lectures after joining the Grand Rapids Ladies' Literary Club after her graduation from Sacred Heart Academy; friends suggested that she pursue lecturing as a career, and she went to the Harvard Annex with that in mind. In Europe she gave lectures and pursued material of interest, meeting with Pope Leo XIII for example (she later met Pope Benedict XV and Pope Pius XI). On her return to the United States, she lectured widely at institutions such as the Brooklyn Institute of Arts and Sciences, the Chicago Art Institute, and Vassar College; her lecture at the French embassy in Washington, DC so impressed President William Howard Taft that he invited Anna and her mother to visit him at his summer home on Lake Champlain. She also spoke at the 1898 biennial meeting of the General Federation of Women's Clubs in Denver, Colorado. She was appointed a member of the Fine Arts department at the Paris Exposition, 1900 by United States Commissioner-General Ferdinand Peck.

== Married life ==
On August 20, 1907 Anna married Grand Rapids lawyer and businessman William F. McKnight and retired from lecturing. She became an extremely active club woman, serving for example as president of the Grand Rapids Ladies' Literary Club (and bringing President Taft, Woodrow Wilson, Theodore Roosevelt and others to lecture there), organizer and president of the local Alliance française, president of the Drama Club, Director of the Michigan State Federation of Women's Clubs, director of the Equal Franchise Club, etc. McKnight also represented Michigan at a variety of events - the Second Pan-American Scientific Congress (1915), the Panama–Pacific International Exposition (1915), meetings of the National Civic Federation (1911-1912), the National Conservation Exposition of 1913, the National Rivers and Harbors Congress of 1913, and others.

== Later life ==
Her husband William McKnight died in 1918, and Anna took over his positions as president of the White River Timber Company and vice-president of the Miami Lumber Company, among other positions. She also began travelling and lecturing again, visiting Russia and India in the post-World War I years and lecturing abroad. In the 1930s she lectured in London and at the Louvre in Paris. France made her a member of the Ordre des Palmes académiques, Officier de l'Instruction Publique. Even living abroad, she continued to be active in civic organizations, serving as vice-president of the American Artists Professional League of Paris from 1938 to 1940.

Anna McKnight is buried in Woodlawn Cemetery in Grand Rapids, with her husband.
