= Krüss Optronic =

Coordinates: 53°36′28.4″N 10°00′27.8″E

A. Krüss Optronic GmbH
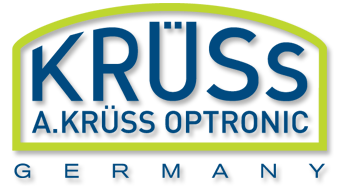
- Company type: Private limited company
- Industry: Optics, Laboratory Equipment
- Founded: 1796; 230 years ago
- Founder: Edmund Gabory
- Headquarters: Hamburg, Germany
- Website: https://www.kruess.com/en/

A. Krüss Optronic GmbH is a German manufacturer and distributor of optical and electronic laboratory equipment as well as instruments for gemology. The Hamburg-based company is one of the traditional Hanseatic family-owned enterprises and one of the oldest companies in Germany. It had its origins in the optical workshop of Mechanicus Opticus Edmund Gabory, founded in 1796. A. Krüss Optronic has a branch office in the US, and representations in many countries of the world.

== History ==
Edmund Gabory trained in London, with the well-known optician Jesse Ramsden. After some years in their own workshop in London, in 1796 he and his family moved the business to Hamburg in 1796, a prospering seaport and trading center. In 1844, Edmund Garbory's assistant and son-in-law Andres Krüss founded his own company, A. Krüss Optisches Institut, and sold navigational instruments and nautical charts. The two businesses were joined in 1886 into one company that exists in 2015.

In 1859, Edmund Johann Krüss, the son of Andres, expanded the company by adding a lens-grinding facility, to produce his own lenses for microscopes, photographic cameras and projectors. He demonstrated the quality of his products in his own photographic studio. Edmund Johann constructed early cross-fading slide projectors and received a patent for the magic lantern, a forerunner of movie projectors, in 1865.

During the next decades, the products of the company were presented at many trade fairs and awarded prizes e.g. at the World Exhibitions in Paris (1855), London (1862), Chicago (1893), Paris (1900), Saint Louis (1904) and Brussels 1910.

From 1888 to 1920, the company was managed by Prof. Hugo Krüss, son of Edmund Johann, who did fundamental work on the theory and application of photometry. His Manual of Electro Technical Photometry, written with his brother, chemical engineer Gerhard Krüss, became the standard reference work on this subject. He modernized the company, developing technology in the field of colorimetry.

As founder and first chairman of the Hamburg Society for Precision Engineering and Optics, Prof. Hugo Krüss also became involved as speaker for the photometric industry after 1891 and acted as a consultant for the German government. In this role, he convinced the government to establish a special customs tariff for scientific instruments. The Senat of Hamburg awarded him the title of a professor in 1917, and one year later he was honored Doctor Honoris Causa by the University of Göttingen. In 1930, the City of Hamburg named a street after him.

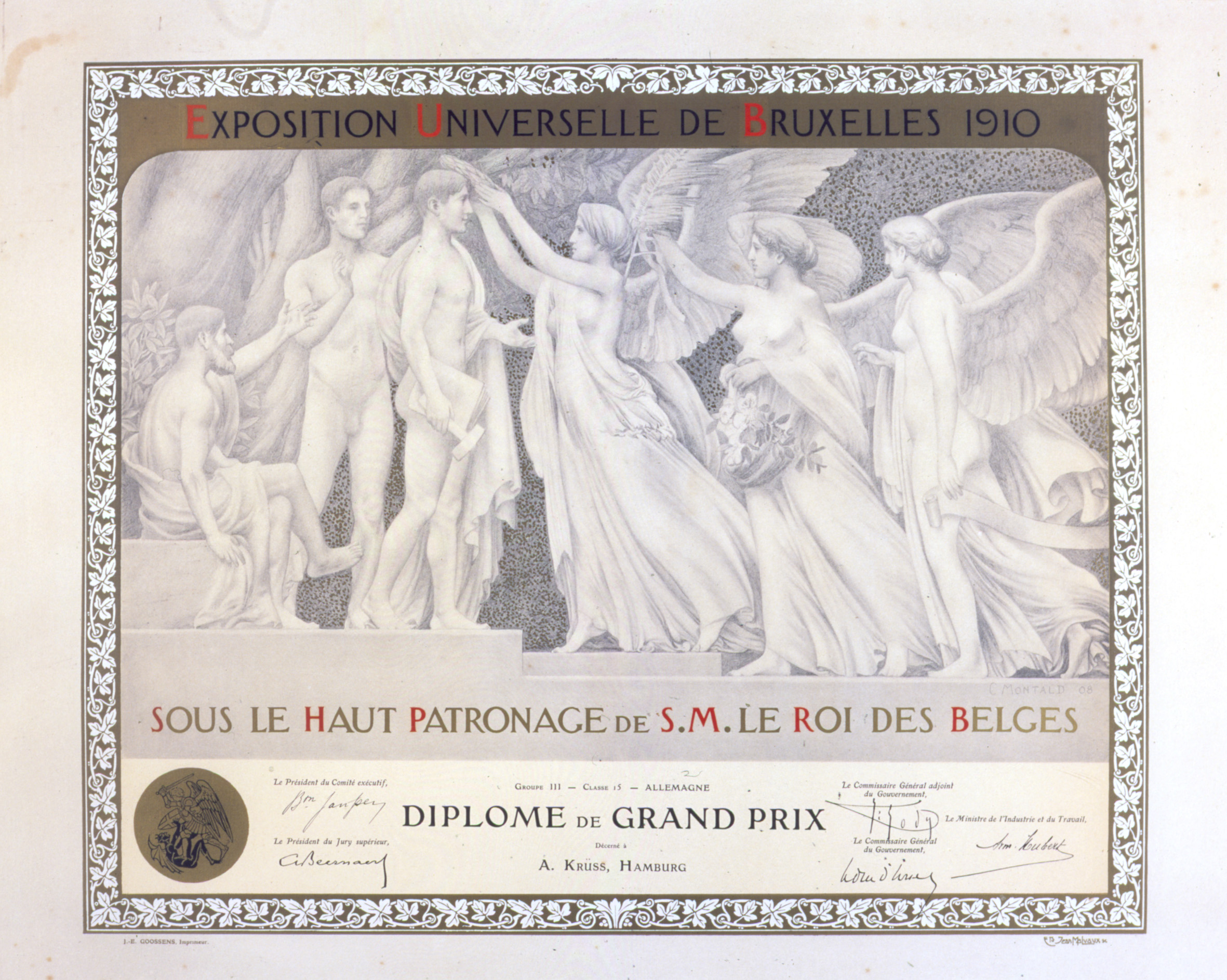
Grand Prix of the World Exhibition, Brussels 1910

Hugo's son, Dr. Paul C joined the company at the age of 24 and continued the work of his father. He developed new physical measurement methods and constructed the corresponding equipment. Paul Krüss led the company through the war years.

After World War II, Paul's son Andres took over as manager. He enlarge the company by expanding global sales during the German economic boom.

In 1980, the company was divided into the two companies Krüss Optronic and Krüss GmbH.

Engineer Cornelius Weser, husband of Andreas Krüss's daughter Marianne, managed Krüss GmbH until 2012. Subsequently, his son, Florian Weser, has taken over management of this company.

Since 1980, Martina Krüss-Leibrock, has been head of Krüss Optronic. Her daughter Karin Leibrock joined in 2005. With her entry, both enterprises have been family-run for eight generations. In February 2009, A. Krüss Optronics moved to a new building close to the Hamburg Airport.

== Krüss Optronic products ==
=== Microscopes ===
Microscopes traditionally are the core product of A. Krüss Optronic. The company offers a great variety of stereoscopic and monocular instruments, dedicated to medical, biological, and technical applications, as well as photographic and video accessories.

=== Polarimeters ===
Polarimeters for the analysis of solutions are available from a robust, manually operated laboratory device to fully automated computer driven sets. Krüss also offers automatic portable polarimeters for quick precise measurements in the field, e.g. for incoming inspections.

=== Refractometers ===
Refractometers are provided for measurement of the refraction index of liquids as well as polymers. Desk-Top and electronic portable refractometers can be used for many applications in the food and chemical industry.

=== Density meters ===
The (mechanical) density is a typical parameter of each compound. A. Krüess Optronic offers digital density meters with an accuracy up to 0.00005 g/cm^{3}. All are compliant to GLP/GMP and ASTM-standards. Results and parameters are displayed on integrated touch-screens and may be delivered through different computer interfaces.

=== Melting point meter ===
The melting point is specific characteristic of a substance. A.Krüss Optronic provides a fully automatic melting point meter for powdery substances. With the device, melting points up to 400 °C can be examined.

Beside these main product groups, A.Krüss Optronic offers a variety of laboratory equipment, like flame-photometers, devices for spectral measurements, UV and analysis lamps, color sensors, and lab-software.

== Gemology ==
A specialty of A.Krüss Optronic is their program of gemological instruments and equipment. It includes gemological magnifiers and microscopes, special spectrometers and gem-refractometers, and complete battery-operated portable laboratories for field operation.
