= 1872 in animation =

The following is a list of events that occurred in 1872 within the field of animation.

== Events ==
- November 9-10: The photographer James Wallace Black produces images of the Great Boston Fire of 1872, which he would later publish in a photographic album titled Ruins of the Great Fire in Boston, November 1872. By the late 1870s, Black's business largely consisted of magic lantern slide production. His images of the Boston Fire circulated in the form of lantern slides.
- Specific date unknown: In 1872, Leland Stanford, a businessman, race-horse owner, and former governor of California hired the photographer Eadweard Muybridge for a portfolio depicting his mansion and other possessions, including his race-horse Occident. Stanford also wanted a proper picture of the horse at full speed. He was frustrated that the existing depictions and descriptions seemed incorrect. The human eye could not fully break down the action at the quick gaits of the trot and gallop. Up until this time, most artists painted horses at a trot with one foot always on the ground; and at a full gallop with the front legs extended forward and the hind legs extended to the rear, and all feet off the ground. There are stories that Stanford had made a $25,000 bet on his theories about horse locomotion, but no evidence has been found of such a wager. However, it has been estimated that Stanford spent a total of $50,000 over the next several years to fund his investigations on animal locomotion. Stanford would initially fund Muybridge's experiments with chronophotography, an important step in the development of motion pictures.

== Births ==
=== April ===
- April 11: Romolo Bacchini, Italian filmmaker, musician, painter, and poet (art director for CAIR (Cartoni Animati Italiani Roma), director or co-director of the unfinished animated feature film The Adventures of Pinocchio, the first animated film based on the namesake novel by Carlo Collodi), (d. 1938).

=== August ===
- August 17: Joaquín Xaudaró, Spanish cartoonist, caricaturist, illustrator, and animator, (co-founder of the Sociedad Española de Dibujos Animados (SEDA), collaborated with K-Hito in the production on an animated film), (d. 1933).

=== November ===
- November 7: Lucille La Verne, American actress, (voice of the Evil Queen in Snow White and the Seven Dwarfs), (d. 1945).

== Sources ==
- Encyclopedia of nineteenth-century photography, Volume 1. CRC Press, 2008.
- Slethaug, Gordon E. (2014). Adaptation Theory and Criticism: Postmodern Literature and Cinema in the USA. Bloomsbury Academic. ISBN 978-1-6235-6028-7.
