= Peter Hubert Desvignes =

Peter Hubert Desvignes (born 29 April 1804, Constantinople, Ottoman Empire; died 27 December 1883 at Hither Green (today Lewisham), Kent, England) was a civil engineer, architect, and inventor. While working for Aloys II, Prince of Liechtenstein, Desvignes oversaw the renovation and reconstruction of the Liechtenstein family seat in Austria. He is credited with inventing early versions of the spirograph and the zoetrope.

== Biography ==
Beginning in 1823 he trained under William Atkinson at the Royal Academy in London. While a student he was awarded, by The Royal Society for the encouragement of Arts, Manufactures & Commerce, the Silver Isis Medal for his drawing of a Corinthian capital, as well as the Silver Palette prize for the drawing of a bust. In 1835 Desvignes took part in the architectural contest for the design of the Houses of Parliament. In 1836, he met (likely in London) Aloys II, Prince of Liechtenstein; the following year he moved to Vienna to begin a long stint as architect for the prince. Until 1849 he oversaw the renovation and reconstruction of the Liechtenstein family seat in Austria, the baroque Stadtpalais Liechtenstein on Schenkenstrasse (today Bankgasse) in Vienna. Desvignes also provided drawings and plans for the Liechtenstein country estate Lednice (in German: Eisgrub) in Moravia, which was renovated and expanded during the same period; among other things, Desvignes was chiefly responsible for the appearance of the glass greenhouse (said to be the earliest cast-iron and glass greenhouse on the continent), which bears some resemblance to Joseph Paxton's greenhouse at the Duke of Devonshire's estate Chatsworth.

Since little is known about his early career in England—the lone documented commission is a stable for a merchant in Liverpool—the city palace of the Liechtenstein family, lavishly renovated and altered at great expense with new, over-the-top neo-rococo interiors and furnishings, is seen as Desvignes' major accomplishment and masterpiece. One of the most costly interior projects of the 19th century in Vienna, it is the earliest—and remains to this day the most important and outstanding—example of rococo-revival architecture in Vienna. Desvignes, working closely with mostly local craftsmen, was responsible for the planning and execution of the rooms and many of their furnishings. A two-story garden pavilion, connected by a bridge to the palace and formerly located on the no longer extant city ramparts is the only documented example of an executed building designed in its entirety by the architect. Over time, the renown of several of the craftsmen he employed for the Liechtenstein project outshone his own. His furniture designs were carried out by the firm of Carl Leistler, which at the time had Michael Thonet under contract. Thonet also created a series of intricate marquetry floors for the palace. Desvignes supported Thonet for two years and helped him establish himself in business.

Following his long stay in Vienna Desvignes returned to England in 1849 where, despite his many attempts, he was unable to build on the architectural success he had achieved in Vienna. As a young man in 1827 he had developed a so-called "Speiragraph", an early prototype for the spirograph.

He evidently continued on with experiments and inventions, and on 27 February 1860 received British patent no. 537 for 28 monocular and stereoscopic variations of cylindrical stroboscopic devices (see zoetrope). Desvignes' Mimoscope later received an honourable mention "for ingenuity of construction" at the 1862 International Exhibition in London. It could "exhibit drawings, models, single or stereoscopic photographs, so as to animate animal movements, or that of machinery, showing various other illusions."

== Death ==
He died at his home (the family owned both Hither Green Lodge and Wilderness House in Lewisham) and was buried in the family plot in the churchyard of St. Mary's Church, Lewisham. His collection of paintings was sold at auction on 17 January and 2 April 1885, at Christie, Mason & Woods in London.

== Extant work ==
—Stadtpalais Liechtenstein, Vienna; interiors and furnishings.
—Schloss Lednice, Moravia; glasshouse.
—A number of drawings for stage sets, strongly reminiscent of Piranesi, came on the market in London in the 1990s; "An elevation of a Design for an Entrance to a Nobleman's Villa" was sold on 14 October 1998 at Christie's in London.
—Furniture has appeared for sale at the Dorotheum, Vienna, including "An unusually large historicist table of round form" likely designed by him in the 2019 sale "Works of Art—Furniture, Sculptures, Glass, and Porcelain", lot 891.
—The "Catalogue of the Designs offered for the New Houses of Parliament now exhibiting in the National Gallery, 1836" includes a description of Desvignes' contest entry; House of Lords Record Office, London.
—Letters, invoices, and photographs in the archives of the ruling Prince of Liechtenstein, Vienna/Vaduz.

== Literature ==
—Colvin, Howard A Biographical Dictionary of British Architects, Omnigraphics Inc., London 1995.
—Huey, Michael Peter Hubert Desvignes und die Neo-Rokoko-Neugestaltung des Stadtpalais Liechtenstein 1837-1849, master's thesis, University of Vienna 1999.
—Kräftner, Johann Das Stadtpalais der Liechtenstein. Geschichte und Restaurierung des fürstlichen Palais in der Wiener Bankgasse, Brandstätter, Vienna 2015.
—Ottilinger, Eva B. und Lieselotte Hanzl Kaiserliche Interieurs. Die Wohnkultur des Wiener Hofes im 19. Jahrhundert, Böhlau Verlag, Vienna 1997.
—Witt-Dörring, Christian "Eine Art Offenbarung. Die Neugestaltung der Innenräume des Stadtpalastes Liechtenstein (1837-1848)" in Parnass, Sonderheft 11/95 (Die Sammlungen des Fürsten von Liechtenstein), Vienna 1995, pp. 72–78.
