= 1867 in animation =

Events in 1867 in animation.

== Events ==
- April 23: The inventor William Ensign Lincoln is granted a U.S. patent for his zoetrope, as an assignor to the board game manufacturing company Milton Bradley and Co. This animation device was also patented in the United Kingdom of Great Britain and Ireland on June 7, 1867 (application March 6, 1867) under no. 629, by Henry Watson Hallett (as a communication to him by Milton Bradley), and in the Second French Empire by Charles William May (filed May 14, 1867).
- Specific date unknown:
  - In his 1867 account about the origin of the optical toy thaumatrope, the French artist Antoine Claudet stated that he had heard that John Ayrton Paris had once been present when John Herschel demonstrated his rotating coin trick to his children. Paris reportedly got the idea for the thaumatrope from Herschel's trick. Claudet also noted in 1867 that the thaumatrope could create a three-dimensional illusion. A spinning rectangular thaumatrope with the alternating letters of the name "Victoria" on each side, showed the full word with the letters at two different distances from the observer's eye. If the two strings of the thaumatrope are attached to the same side of the card, the thickness of the card accounts for a small difference in the distances when each side is visible.
  - W. R. Hill (1823–1901) was Henry Langdon Childe's apprentice in the slide painting art for magic lanterns. In 1867, Hill moved on to work for John Henry Pepper.

== Births ==
=== June ===
- June 8: O'Galop, French animator and cartoonist, (created about 40 animated films between 1910 and 1927), (d. 1946).

=== September ===
- September 10: Alexander Shiryaev, Russian animation director, ballet dancer, ballet master and choreographer, (grom 1906 to 1909, Shiryaev produced a number of pioneering stop motion and traditionally animated films. He recreated various ballets by staging them through using hand-made dolls which he created from either clay or papier-mâché; they were 20–25 cm (7.9–9.8 in) tall, and their body parts were connected by thin wire which provided plasticity. He then filmed them on camera, frame by frame. In the process he also made thousands of sketches, catching every movement, also turning them into a filming reel so that one could watch the entire dance in the form of a cartoon, (d. 1941).
