= 1864 in animation =

Events in 1864 in animation.

== Events ==
- Specific date unknown:
  - According to the 1864 narrative of the British mathematician Charles Babbage, the thaumatrope was invented by the Irish geologist William Henry Fitton. Babbage had told Fitton how the astronomer John Herschel had challenged him to show both sides of a shilling at once. Babbage held the coin in front of a mirror, but Herschel showed how both sides were visible when the coin was spun on the table. A few days later Fitton brought Babbage a new illustration of the principle, consisting of a round disc of card suspended between two pieces of sewing silk. This disc had a parrot on one side and a cage at the other side. Babbage and Fitton made several different designs and amused some friends with them for a short while. They forgot about it until some months later they heard about the supposed invention of the thaumatrope by John Ayrton Paris.
  - In 1864, the Dundee-based mechanic James Laing presented his motororoscope to the Royal Scottish Society of Arts. The device allowed a relatively large number of stereoscopic pictures to be pasted on the inside of a "revolving web" with slits, transported over two rollers to pass in front of stereoscopic eyepieces. The rectangular openings of the viewer were adapted to the shape and size of the slits to avoid flaring and to reduce flicker. The demonstrated picture sequence was photographed with wooden models, with a bit of white wool round a bendable wire representing smoke coming from a cottage chimney, a paper flag and mill fans of wood. The instrument "excited considerable interest" at this presentation.

== Births ==
=== January ===
- January 4: George Albert Smith, English filmmaker, inventor, magic lantern lecturer, stage hypnotist, and claimed psychic, (In 1894, Smith started staging magic lantern shows of a series of dissolving views. Smith's skilful manipulation of the lantern, cutting between lenses (from slide to slide) to show changes in time, perspective and location necessary for storytelling, allowed him to develop many of the skills he would later put to use as a pioneering filmmaker. He is credited with developing the grammar of film editing. He developed special effects by using his own patented process of double-exposure. Smith developed the Lee-Turner Process into the first successful color film process, Kinemacolor), (d. 1959).

=== March ===
- March 11: Henri Rivière, French painter and designer, (created a form of shadow play for the Chat Noir cabaret. Shadow plays are considered a precursor to silhouette animation), (d. 1951).

=== Specific date unknown ===
- Benjamin Rabier, French animator, comic book artist, and illustrator, (creator of Gideon the Duck. a character adapted into an animated television series; designed the logo of The Laughing Cow brand; credited for inspiring younger artists, primarily Hergé and Edmond-François Calvo), (d. 1939).

== Deaths ==
=== June ===
- June 3: Moses Holden, English astronomer, (constructed a large orrery and a magic lantern, in order to illustrate his astronomical lectures. He was touring throughout Northern England to give magic lantern lectures), dies at age 76.

=== November ===
- November 10: Simon von Stampfer, Austrian inventor, mathematician, and surveyor, (co-inventor of the phenakistiscope, the first widespread animation device that created a fluent illusion of motion), dies at an unknown age.

== Sources ==
- Hall, Trevor H. (1964). The Strange Case of Edmund Gurney. Gerald Duckworth.
