= 1861 in animation =

Events in 1861 in animation.

== Events ==
May 2: On May 2, 1861, while working near Paris, Henri Désiré du Mont filed French patent 49,520 for "a photographic device for reproduction of the successive phases of movement". It would transport 10 or 12 photographic plates, one by one, from a slotted frame, past the camera lens, into a lower receptacle area. A moving shutter was synchronized to ensure the plates were only exposed when they were in the right place.

- Specific date unknown:
  - In 1861 the American engineer Coleman Sellers II received US patent No. 35,317 for the kinematoscope, a device that exhibited "stereoscopic pictures as to make them represent objects in motion". In his application he stated: "This has frequently been done with plane pictures but has never been, with stereoscopic pictures". He used three sets of stereoscopic photographs in a sequence with some duplicates to regulate the flow of a simple repetitive motion, but also described a system for very large series of pictures of complicated motion.
  - In 1861 the Czech physiologist Jan Evangelista Purkyně used his version of the phenakistiscope to illustrate the beating of a heart.
  - In 1861 Samuel Goodale patented a hand-turned stereoscope device which rapidly moved stereo images past a viewer, in a fashion similar to the later mutoscope.
  - In 1861 the Scottish scientist James Clerk Maxwell produced the first colour photograph, displayed by using three magic lantern projectors with different colour filters.

== Births ==
=== December ===
- December 8: Georges Méliès, French film director, actor, and stage magician (pioneered the production of trick films and stop-motion animation, and the use of storyboards; credited with discovering the stop trick), (d. 1938).

== Deaths ==
=== May ===
- May 13: William Henry Fitton, Irish physician and geologist, (credited as the inventor of the animation device thaumatrope in the memoirs of his friend Charles Babbage), dies at age 81.

== Sources ==
- Carroll, Noël (1996), Theorizing the Moving Image, Cambridge: Cambridge University Press
- Rosen, Miriam (1987), "Méliès, Georges", in Wakeman, John (ed.), World Film Directors: Volume I, 1890–1945, New York: The H.W. Wilson Company, pp. 747–65
