= 1869 in animation =

Events in 1869 in animation.

== Events ==
- November 26: the Reverend Richard Pilkington received "Useful Registered Design Number 5074" for his Pedemascope. This was a variation of the optical toy thaumatrope. It had a card with pictures "painted in two different positions on both sides". This card was placed in the two-part mahogany holder with a handle and a brass pin that would semi-rotate the card when it was twirled, using a bit of iron to prevent full rotation. Transparent or cut-out variations were suggested for use with the magic lantern.
- Specific date unknown:
  - An "Optical Instrument" was patented in the United States in 1869 by O.B. Brown, using a phenakistiscope-like disc with a technique very close to the later cinematograph; with Maltese Cross motion; a star-wheel and pin being used for intermittent motion, and a two-sector shutter.
  - Thomas Ross developed a small and transparent phenakistiscope system, called Wheel of life, which fitted inside a standard magic lantern slide. A first version, patented in 1869, had a glass disc with eight phases of a movement and a counter-rotating glass shutter disc with eight apertures. The discs depicted ice skaters, fishes, a giant's ladder, a bottle imp, and other subjects. Ross introduced an improved version of his animation device in 1871.
  - In 1869, Louis Arthur Ducos du Hauron suggested the use of colored line sheets for the photographic printing of color photographs. Over the following decades, several halftone printing and color photography processes inspired the use of line screens for autostereoscopic images. The developments led to the emergence of barrier-grid animation and stereography in the 1890s.
  - In 1869, the civil engineer Charles Joseph Minard produced a flow map of Napoleon's March on Moscow. It was an early example of scientific visualization, and prefigured modern scientific visualization techniques which use computer graphics.

== Births ==
=== July ===
- July 12: Walter R. Booth, British stage magician and film pioneer (pioneer in the production of trick films, directed the animated short film The Hand of the Artist, which is credited as the first British animated film), (d. 1938).

=== September ===
- September 6: Felix Salten, Austro-Hungarian writer, literary critic, hunter, and Zionist political activist (authored the bildungsroman-style novel Bambi, a Life in the Woods, sold the film rights to it, and had his novel adapted into the animated feature film Bambi), (d. 1945).

=== October ===
- October 8: Pat Powers, Irish-born American film and animation producer and distributor (served as the first distributor of Walt Disney's film series Mickey Mouse and Silly Symphonies, co-founder (with Ub Iwerks) of the animation studio Iwerks Studio; produced the silent animated film series Fuller Pep, which was similar in premise to Paul Terry's Farmer Al Falfa series; sold to Walt Disney the Powers Cinephone which enabled Disney to produce sound cartoons, such as Mickey Mouse's Steamboat Willie), (d. 1948).

== Deaths ==
=== September ===
- September 12: Peter Mark Roget, British chess player, lexicographer, natural theologian, and physician, (his work Explanation of an optical deception in the appearance of the spokes of a wheel when seen through vertical apertures, a 1824 paper on optical illusions, is often regarded as the origin of the persistence of vision theory, which was commonly used to explain apparent motion in film and animation; claimed to have invented an early version of the animation device phenakistiscope which was supposedly older than Joseph Plateau's version), dies at age 90.
