= John Barnes Linnett =

British lithograph printer

Kineograph patent

John Barnes Linnett (born c. 1831 – 9 October 1870) was a British lithograph printer based in Birmingham, England. Although the French Pierre-Hubert Desvignes is generally credited with being the inventor of the flip book, Linnett was the first to patent the invention, in 1868, under the name of kineograph.

He was born in Austrey, Warwickshire.

Linnett died of pneumonia in 1870 in Moseley, Warwickshire. His wife sold the patent to an American.
