= Stereopticon =

19th-century photographic image projector

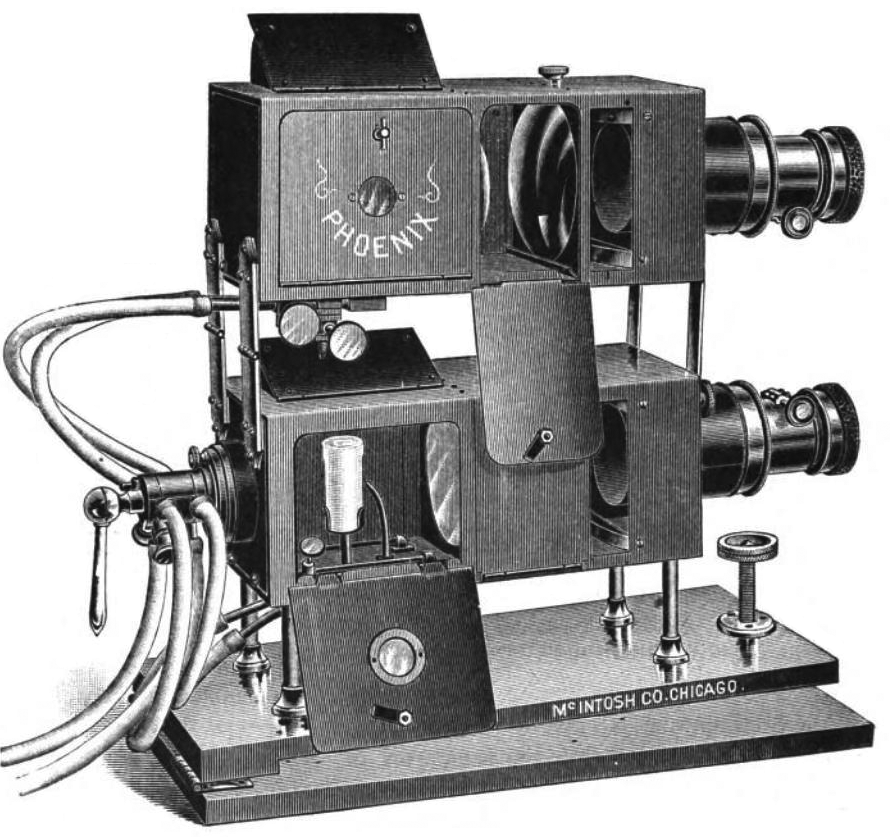
Illustration of a stereopticon

A stereopticon is a slide projector or relatively powerful "magic lantern", which has two lenses, usually one above the other, and has mainly been used to project photographic images. These devices date back to the mid 19th century, and were a popular form of entertainment and education before the advent of moving pictures.

Magic lanterns originally used rather weak light sources, like candles or oil lamps, that produced projections that were just large and strong enough to entertain small groups of people. During the 19th century stronger light sources, like limelight, became available.

For the "dissolving views" lantern shows that were popularized by Henry Langdon Childe since the late 1830s, lanternists needed to be able to project two aligned pictures in the same spot on a screen, gradually dimming a first picture while revealing a second one. This could be done with two lanterns, but soon biunial lanterns (with two objectives placed one above the other) became common.

William and Frederick Langenheim from Philadelphia introduced a photographic glass slide technology at the Crystal Palace Exhibition in London in 1851. For circa two centuries magic lanterns had been used to project painted images from glass slides, but the Langenheim brothers seem to have been the first to incorporate the relatively new medium of photography (introduced in 1839). To enjoy the details of photographic slides optimally, the stronger lanterns were needed.

By 1860 Massachusetts chemist and businessman John Fallon improved a large biunial lantern, imported from the United Kingdom, and named it 'stereopticon'.

For a usual fee of ten cents, people could view realistic images of nature, history, and science themes. The two lenses are used to dissolve between images when projected. This "visual storytelling" with technology directly preceded the development of the first moving pictures.

The term stereopticon has been widely misused to name a stereoscope. The stereopticon has not commonly been used for three-dimensional images.
