= 1871 in animation =

Events in 1871 in animation.

== Events ==
- October 10: Thomas Ross received British Patent 2685 for an improved version of his small transparent phenakistiscope system, which was called Wheel of life. This version of the animation device had 13 images and a single slot shutter disc.
- Specific date unknown: During the Siege of Paris (1870-1871) by the Prussian Army, the inventor René Dagron proposed to the French authorities to use his microfilming process to carry the messages by carrier pigeons across German lines. Dagron photographed pages of newspapers in their entirety which he then converted into miniature photographs. He subsequently removed the collodion film from the glass base and rolled it tightly into a cylindrical shape which he then inserted into miniature tubes that were transported fastened to the tail feathers of the pigeons. Upon receipt the microphotograph was reattached to a glass frame and was then projected by magic lantern on the wall. The message contained in the microfilm could then be transcribed or copied. By 28 January 1871, when Paris and the Government of National Defense surrendered, Dagron had delivered 115,000 messages to Paris by carrier pigeon.

== Births ==
=== September ===
- September 26 (estimated): Winsor McCay, Canadian-American animator, cartoonist, and vaudeville performer, (pioneered the animation techniques of inbetweening, registration marks, and cycling, directed the animated films Little Nemo, How a Mosquito Operates, Gertie the Dinosaur, The Sinking of the Lusitania, and The Centaurs), (d. 1934).

=== October ===
- October 17: Segundo de Chomón, Spanish film director, cinematographer, and screenwriter, (pioneer in the production of trick films, his films relied extensively on animation, a field in which he was a pioneer; he used animation techniques which were seldom used by his main competitor, Georges Méliès. His stop-motion film Sculpteur moderne featured heaps of clay molding themselves into detailed sculptures that were capable of minor movements.) (d. 1929).

== Sources ==
- Bendazzi, Giannalberto (1994). Cartoons: One Hundred Years of Cinema Animation. Indiana University Press. ISBN 978-0-253-31168-9.
- Canemaker, John (2005). Winsor McCay: His Life and Art (Revised ed.). Abrams Books. ISBN 978-0-8109-5941-5.
- Crafton, Donald (1993). Before Mickey: The Animated Film 1898–1928. University of Chicago Press. ISBN 9780226116679.
- Syracuse Herald staff (July 27, 1934). "Winsor M'Cay Early Comic Artist, Dies". Syracuse Herald. p. 12.
