= Zoetrope =

Pre-cinema animation device

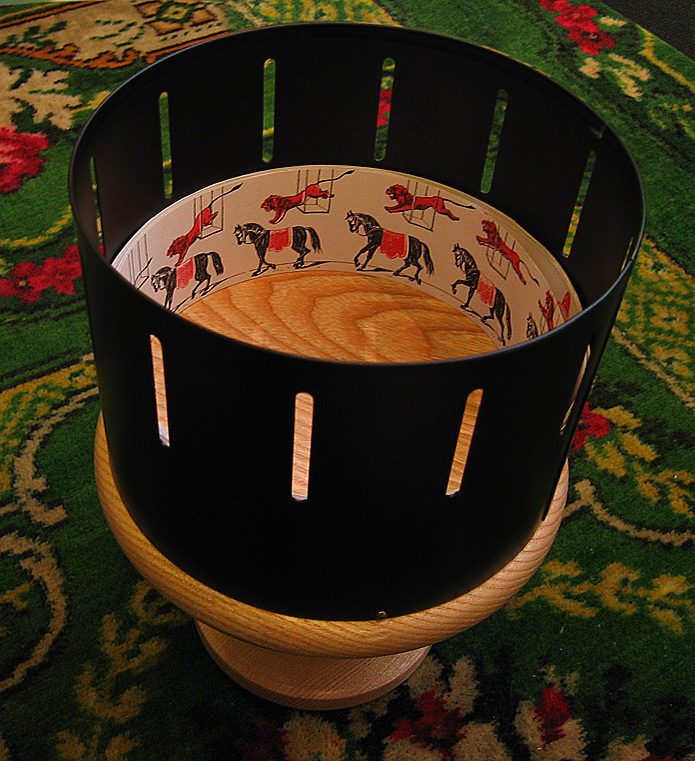
A replica of a Victorian zoetrope

A zoetrope is a pre-film animation device that produces the illusion of motion, by displaying a sequence of drawings or photographs showing progressive phases of that motion. A zoetrope is a cylindrical variant of the phenakistiscope, an apparatus suggested after the stroboscopic discs were introduced in 1833. The definitive version of the zoetrope, with replaceable film picture film strips, was introduced as a toy by Milton Bradley in 1866 and became very successful.

== Etymology ==
The name zoetrope was composed from the Greek root words ζωή zoe, "life" and τρόπος tropos, "turning" as a translation of "wheel of life". The term was coined by inventor William E. Lincoln, of Providence, Rhode Island.

== Technology ==
Simulation of a zoetrope. Looking at the middle slot in the top frame reveals a flickering animation. The bottom frame shows its appearance without looking through a slot.

The zoetrope consists of a cylinder with cuts vertically in the sides. On the inner surface of the cylinder is a band with images from a set of sequenced pictures. As the cylinder spins, the user looks through the cuts at the pictures across. The scanning of the slits keeps the pictures from simply blurring together, and the user sees a rapid succession of images, producing the illusion of motion. From the late 19th century, devices working on similar principles have been developed, named analogously as linear zoetropes and 3D zoetropes, with traditional zoetropes referred to as "cylindrical zoetropes" if distinction is needed. The zoetrope works on the same principle as its predecessor, the phenakistoscope, but is more convenient and allows the animation to be viewed by several people at the same time. Instead of being radially arrayed on a disc, the sequence of pictures depicting phases of motion is on a paper strip. For viewing, this is placed against the inner surface of the lower part of an open-topped metal drum, the upper part of which is provided with a vertical viewing slit across from each picture. The drum, on a spindle base, is spun. The faster the drum is spun, the smoother the animation appears.

== Earlier rotating devices with images ==
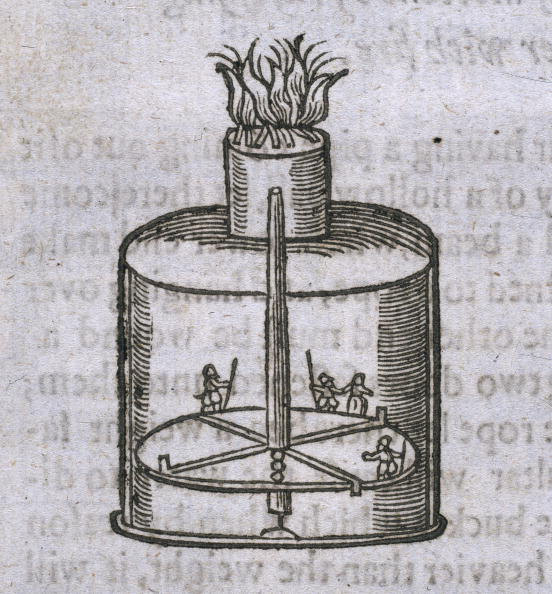
Device described in John Bate's The Mysteries of Nature and Art (1635)

An earthenware bowl from Iran, over 5000 years old, could be considered a predecessor of the zoetrope. This bowl is decorated in a series of images portraying a goat jumping toward a tree and eating its leaves. Though the images are sequential and seem evenly distributed around the bowl, to have the images appear as an animation the bowl would have to rotate quite fast and steadily while a stroboscopic effect would somehow have to be generated. As such, it remains very uncertain if the artist who created the bowl actually intended to create an animation.

According to a 4th-century Chinese historical text, the 1st-century BC Chinese mechanical engineer and craftsman Ding Huan created a lamp with a circular band with images of birds and animals that moved "quite naturally" when the heat of the lamp caused the band to rotate. However, it is unclear whether this really created the illusion of motion or whether the account was an interpretation of the spatial movement of the pictures of animals. Possibly the same device was referred to as "umbrella lamp" and mentioned as "a variety of zoetrope" which "may well have originated in China" by historian of Chinese technology Joseph Needham. It had pictures painted on thin panes of paper or mica on the sides of a light cylindrical canopy bearing vanes at the top. When placed over a lamp it would give an impression of movement of animals or men. Needham mentions several other descriptions of figures moving after the lighting of a candle or lamp, but some of these have a semi-fabulous context or can be compared to heat operated carousel toys. It is possible that all these early Chinese examples were actually the same as, or very similar to, the "trotting horse lamp" [走馬燈] known in China since before 1000 AD. This is a lantern which on the inside has cut-out silhouettes or painted figures attached to a shaft with a paper vane impeller on top, rotated by heated air rising from a lamp. The moving silhouettes are projected on the thin paper sides of the lantern. Some versions added extra motion with jointed heads, feet or hands of figures triggered by a transversely connected iron wire. None of these lamps are known to have featured sequential substitution of images depicting motion and thus don't display animation in the way that the zoetrope does.

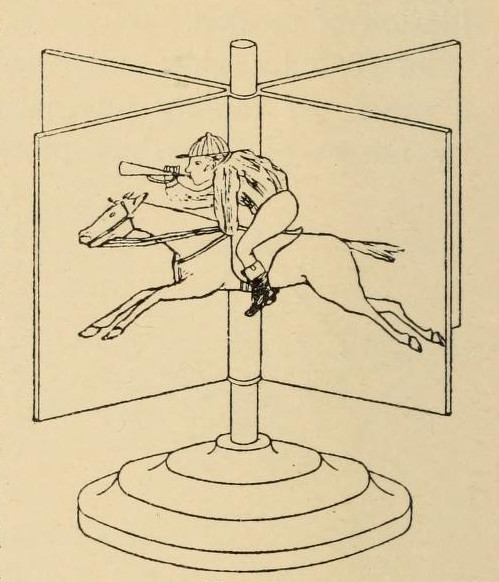
Four phase animation device as depicted in Hopwood's Living Pictures (1899)

John Bate described a simple device in his 1634 book "The Mysteries of Nature and Art". It consisted of "a light Card, with severall images set upon it", fastened on the four spokes of a wheel, which was turned around by heat inside a glass or horn cylinder, "ſo that you would think the immages to bee living creatures by their motion". The description seems rather close to a simple four-phase animation device depicted and described in Henry V. Hopwood's 1899 book Living Pictures (see picture). Hopwood gave no name, date or any additional information for this toy that rotated when blown upon. A similar device inside a small zoetrope drum with four slits, was marketed around 1900 by a Parisian company as L'Animateur (or The Animator). However, Bate's device as it is seen in the accompanying illustration seems not to have actually animated the images, but rather to have moved the images around spatially.

== Invention ==
=== Simon Stampfer (1833) ===
Simon Stampfer, one of the inventors of the phenakistiscope animation disc (or "stroboscopic discs" as he called them), suggested in July 1833 in a pamphlet that the sequence of images for the stroboscopic animation could alternatively be placed on a cylinder, or a looped strip of paper or canvas stretched around two parallel rollers.

=== William Horner (1834) ===
After taking notice of Joseph Plateau's invention of the phénakisticope (published in London as "phantasmascope") British mathematician William George Horner thought up a cylindrical variation and published details about its mathematical principles in January 1834. He called his device the Dædaleum, as a reference to the Greek myth of Daedalus. Horner's revolving drum had viewing slits between the pictures, instead of above as the later zoetrope variations would have. Horner planned to publish the dædaleum with optician King, Jr in Bristol but it "met with some impediment probably in the sketching of the figures".

=== Experimental photographic sequence viewers (1850s–1860s) ===
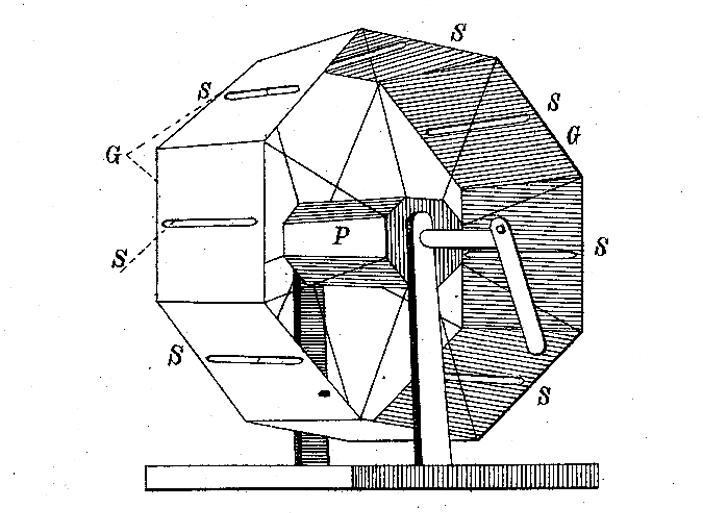
Czermak's 1855 Stereophoroskop

During the next three decades, the phénakisticope remained the more common animation device, while only a few experimental variations followed the idea of Horner's dædaleum or Stampfer's stroboscopic cylinder. Many of the zoetrope-like devices created between 1833 and 1865 were intended for viewing photographic sequences, often with a stereoscopic effect. These included Johann Nepomuk Czermak's Stereophoroskop, about which he published an article in 1855.

On February 27, 1860, Peter Hubert Desvignes received British patent no. 537 for 28 monocular and stereoscopic variations of cylindrical stroboscopic devices. This included a version that used an endless band of pictures running between two spools that was intermittently lit by an electric spark. Desvignes' Mimoscope, received an Honourable Mention "for ingenuity of construction" at the 1862 International Exhibition in London. It could "exhibit drawings, models, single or stereoscopic photographs, so as to animate animal movements, or that of machinery, showing various other illusions". Desvignes "employed models, insects and other objects, instead of pictures, with perfect success". The horizontal slits (like in Czermak's Stereophoroskop) allowed a much improved view, with both eyes, of the opposite pictures.

=== William Ensign Lincoln & Milton Bradley's Zoetrope (1865–1867) ===
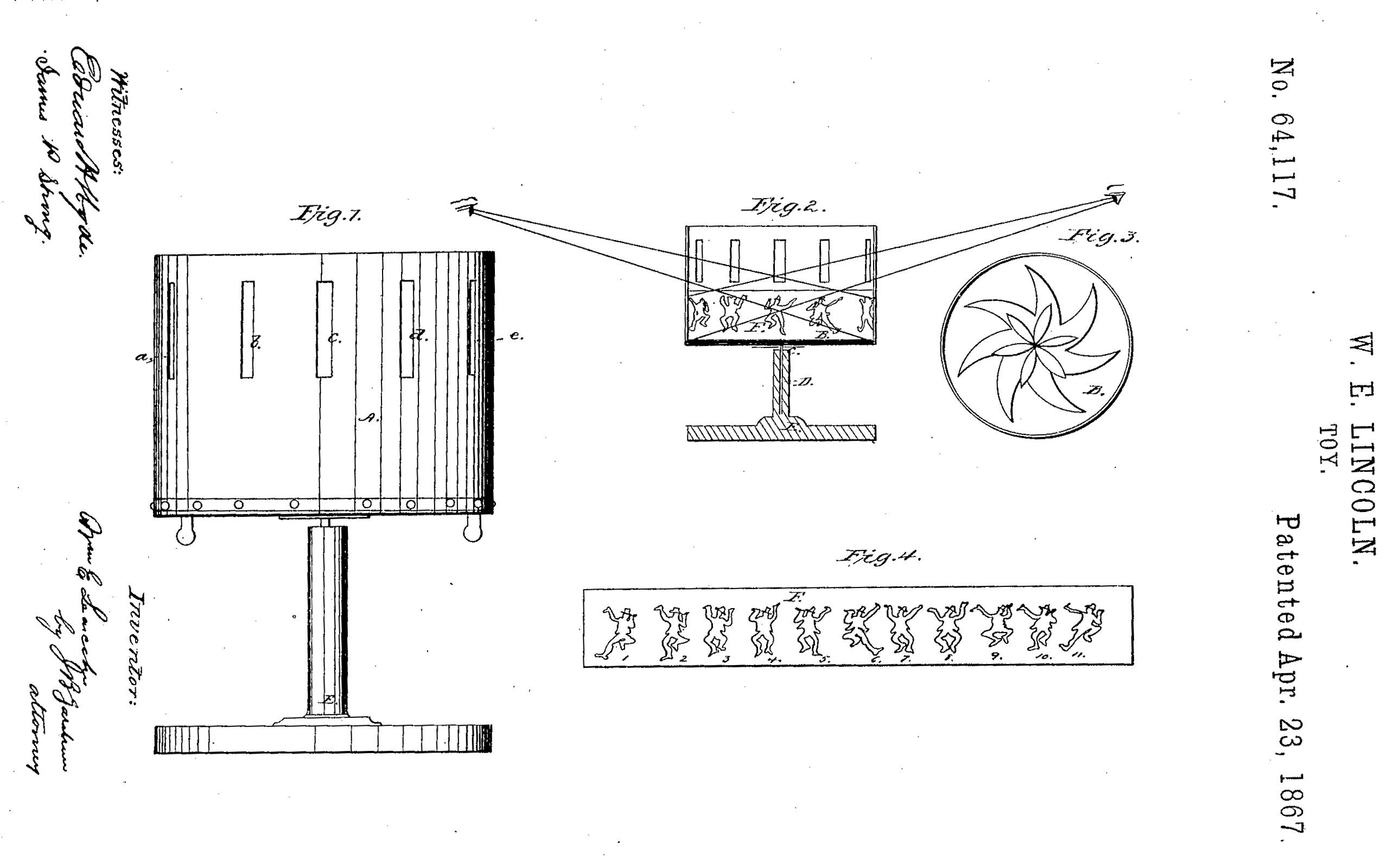
W.E. Lincoln's U.S. Patent No. 64,117 of April 23, 1867

William Ensign Lincoln invented the definitive zoetrope in 1865 when he was about 18 years old and a sophomore at Brown University, Providence, Rhode Island. Lincoln's patented version had the viewing slits on a level above the pictures, which allowed the use of easily replaceable strips of images. It also had an illustrated paper disc on the base, which was not always exploited on the commercially produced versions. On advice of a local bookstore owner, Lincoln sent a model to color lithographers and board game manufacturers Milton Bradley and Co. Some shop owners advertised the zoetrope in American newspapers in December 1866. William E. Lincoln applied for a U.S. patent for his Zoëtrope on July 27, 1866 as an assignor to Milton Bradley, and it was granted on April 23, 1867. It was also patented in the United Kingdom of Great Britain and Ireland on June 7, 1867 (application March 6, 1867) under no. 629, by Henry Watson Hallett (as a communication to him by Milton Bradley), and in the Second French Empire by Charles William May (filed May 14, 1867).

Over the years Milton Bradley released at least seven numbered series of twelve zoetrope strips each, as well as a set of twelve strips by Professor Robert Hallowell Richards showing the gradual transformations from one isometric form to another, and one separately available strip showing the progress of the Grecian bend (a woman morphing into a camel). The London Stereoscopic and Photographic Company was licensed as the British publisher and repeated most of the Milton Bradley animations, while adding a set of twelve animations by famous British illustrator George Cruikshank in 1870. French licensee F. Delacour & Bakes produced the "Zootrope, ou cercle magique", of which newspaper Le Figaro ordered 10,000 copies to sell to subscribers at a reduced price.

=== James Clerk Maxwell's improved zoetrope ===
In 1868 James Clerk Maxwell had an improved zoetrope constructed. Instead of slits it used concave lenses with a focal length equaling the diameter of the cylinder. The virtual image was thus seen in the centre and appeared much more sharp and steady than in the original zoetrope. Maxwell drew several strips that mostly demonstrated subjects relating to physics, like the vibrations of a harp string or Helmholtz's vortex rings threading through each other. An article about the "Zootrope perfectionné" was published in French scientific magazine Le Cosmos in 1869, but the device was never marketed. Maxwell's original zoetrope and some strips are kept in the collection of the Cavendish Museum in Cambridge.

== Linear zoetropes ==
A linear zoetrope consists of an opaque linear screen with thin vertical slits in it. Behind each slit is an image, often illuminated. A motion picture is seen by moving past the display.

Linear zoetropes have several differences compared to cylindrical zoetropes due to their different geometries. Linear zoetropes can have arbitrarily long animations and can cause images to appear wider than their actual sizes.

=== Subway zoetropes ===
==== Japan ====
Linear zoetrope-like advertising was in use in Japan in the early 1990s, for example on the line between the Narita airport and central Tokyo.

==== United States ====
The Masstransiscope artwork

In September 1980, independent filmmaker Bill Brand installed a type of linear zoetrope he called the "Masstransiscope" in an unused subway platform at the former Myrtle Avenue station on the New York City Subway. It consists of a wall with 228 slits; behind each slit is a hand-painted panel, and riders of passing trains see a motion picture. After falling into a state of disrepair, the "Masstransiscope" was restored in late 2008. Since then, a variety of artists and advertisers have begun to use subway tunnel walls to produce a zoetrope effect when viewed from moving trains.

Joshua Spodek, as an astrophysics graduate student, conceived of and led the development of a class of linear zoetropes that saw the zoetrope's first commercial success in over a century. A display of his design debuted in September 2001 in the Atlanta subway system tunnel and showed an advertisement to riders moving past. The display is internally lit and nearly 980 feet (300 m) long, with an animation lasting around 20 seconds. His design soon appeared, both commercially and artistically, in subway systems around North America, Asia, and Europe.

In April 2006, the Washington Metro installed advertisement zoetropes between the Metro Center and Gallery Place subway stations. A similar advertisement was installed on the PATH train in New Jersey, between the World Trade Center and Exchange Place stations.

At around the same time, the San Francisco Bay Area Rapid Transit (BART) system installed a zoetrope-type advertisement between the Embarcadero and Montgomery stations which could be viewed by commuters traveling in either direction. The BART ads are still visible, though they are changed infrequently: a particular ad may remain up for several months before being replaced.

The New York City Subway hosted two digital linear zoetropes through its Arts for Transit program. One, "Bryant Park in Motion", was installed in 2010 at the Bryant Park subway station, and was created by Spodek and students at New York University's Tisch School of Arts' Interactive Telecommunications Program. The other, "Union Square in Motion", was installed in 2011 by Spodek and students and alumni from Parsons the New School for Design's Art, Media, and Technology program in the Union Square station.

==== Other places ====
The Kyiv Metro (in Kyiv, Ukraine) also featured an advertisement about 2008 for Life mobile telephone carrier in one of its subway tunnels that featured the zoetrope effect. It was quickly taken down.

In Mexico City, Mexico, an advertisement for the Honda Civic featuring a zoetrope effect was placed in one of the Line 2 tunnels.

The Zurich Airport Skymetro features a linear zoetrope.

LAIKA animation studios designed a linear zoetrope featuring lip synced audio, a camera, flywheel and 3D printed faces in Brian McLean's TED talk.

== 3D zoetropes ==
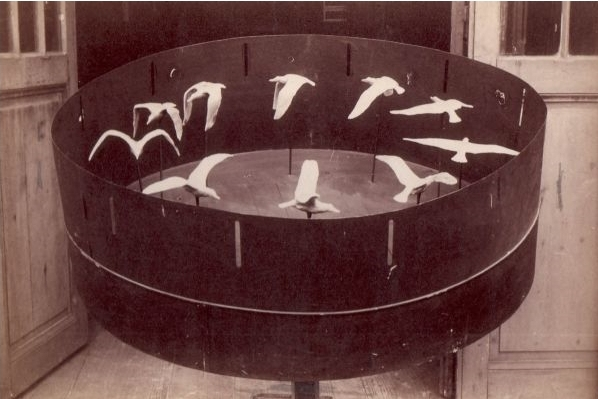
Marey's 1887 zoetrope with ten sculptures of different phases of the flight of a gull

3D zoetropes apply the same principle to three-dimensional models, as already practiced by Czermak (1855) and Desvignes (1860) in predecessors of the zoetrope. In 1887, Étienne-Jules Marey used a large zoetrope to animate a series of plaster models based on his chronophotographs of birds in flight. Modern equivalents normally dispense with the slitted drum and instead use a rapidly flashing strobe light to illuminate the models, producing much clearer and sharper distortion-free results. The models are mounted on a rotating base and the light flashes on and off within an extremely small fraction of a second as each successive model passes the same spot. The stroboscopic effect makes each seem to be a single animated object. By allowing the rotation speed to be slightly out of synchronization with the strobe, the animated objects can be made to appear to also move slowly forwards or backwards, according to how much faster or slower each rotation is than the corresponding series of strobe flashes.

=== Ghibli ===
Media artist Toshio Iwai used variations of zoetrope in his works since 1980s. He supervised a 3D zoetrope featuring characters from the animated movie My Neighbor Totoro for the Ghibli Museum, which opened in 2001 in Tokyo, Japan. The zoetrope is accompanied by an explanatory display, and is part of an exhibit explaining the principles of animation and historical devices.

=== Toy Story ===
Pixar created a 3D zoetrope inspired by Ghibli's for its touring exhibition, which first showed at the Museum of Modern Art in New York City and features characters from Toy Story 2. Two more 3D Zoetropes were created by Pixar, both featuring 360-degree viewing. One was installed at Disney California Adventure, sister park to Disneyland, but has since been moved to The Walt Disney Studios Lot in Burbank, CA. The other was installed at Hong Kong Disneyland from 2010 until 2017, and is now shown in Disneyland Paris as of late 2019. The original Toy Story Zoetrope still travels worldwide and has been shown in 34 national museums and art galleries in 18 countries since 2005.

=== All Things Fall ===
All Things Fall is a 3D printed zoetrope, created by British artist Mat Collishaw. It is inspired by a painting by Ippolito Scarsella of The Massacre of Innocents. The work was presented during the solo exhibition Black Mirror at Galleria Borghese in Rome. It is made of steel, aluminium, plaster, resin, lit by LED lights and powered by an electric motor. Of his work, Collishaw says: "The zoetrope literally repeats characters to create an overwhelming orgy of violence that is simultaneously appalling and compelling." Each model figure was 3D printed with a fused deposition modeling technique in acrylonitrile butadiene styrene.

=== Peter Hudson ===
Over the period 2002–2016, Peter Hudson and the makers at Spin Art, LLC, have created multiple interactive 3D stroboscopic zoetrope art installations. This began with Sisyphish (2002), a human powered zoetrope that used strobe light to animate human figures swimming on a large rotating disk. Sisyphish, sometimes called The Playa Swimmers, was originally unveiled at the arts and culture event, Burning Man, in the Black Rock Desert of Nevada.

Peter has since created stroboscopic zoetropes from 2004 to present including: Deeper (2004), Homouroboros (2007), Tantalus (2008), and Charon, which toured Europe and the United Kingdom in summer of 2012. The Charon zoetrope is built to resemble and rotate in the same kinetic fashion as a ferris wheel, stands at 32 feet high, weighs 8 tons and features twenty rowing skeleton figures representing the mythological character, Charon, who carries souls of the newly deceased across the river Styx. Hudson's most recent zoetrope creation is entitled Eternal Return, took two years to build, and was unveiled in 2014 in the Black Rock Desert.

Peter Hudson's zoetropes are based in San Francisco are exhibited at various festivals and special events in the United States and internationally throughout the year.

=== Other examples ===
Wick Alexander and Robin Brailsford's 2001 4-piece artwork titled "Moving Pictures" consists of 4 sculptural zoetropes at different public locations in Culver City, California.

== Giant zoetropes ==
An 1857 textbook on physics mentioned an early cylindrical stroboscopic installation with moving images that was 18 feet (5.5 meters) in diameter and had been exhibited in Frankfurt.

A "Great Zoetrope; or: Wheel of Life", 50 feet (15 meters) in circumference, with "life-size figures", was installed in the Concert Hall of the Crystal Palace in London by permission of the London Stereoscopic and Photographic Company. The programme featured at least four animations based on strips in their catalogue. The huge cylinder was turned around by a gas engine and was operative at least from late 1867 to spring 1868.

The BRAVIA-drome at Venaria, in Northern Italy

In 2008, Artem Limited, a UK visual effects house, built a 10-meter wide, 10-metric ton zoetrope for Sony, called the BRAVIA-drome, to promote Sony's motion interpolation technology. It features 64 images of the Brazilian footballer Kaká. This has been declared the largest zoetrope in the world by Guinness World Records.

In 2010, the artist Yishay Garbasz created a 3 meter wide zoetrope for the Busan Biennale with images of her naked body one year before to one year after her gender-affirming surgery.

In 2014, Brazilian graffiti-street art duo OSGEMEOS made a large piece called “Untitled (Zoetrope)” featuring their characteristic yellow characters, with an accompanying animation of the zoetrope in motion. It is part of the OSGEMEOS: Endless Story exhibition at the Hirshhorn Museum and Sculpture Garden (2024-2025).

== Successors ==
Émile Reynaud's 1877 praxinoscope was an improvement on the zoetrope that became popular toward the end of the 19th century. It replaced the zoetrope's narrow viewing slits with an inner circle of mirrors that intermittently reflected the images.

Soon after the zoetrope became popular, the flip book was introduced in 1868. With its simplicity and compactness, along with its more tactile qualities, the flip book has stayed relatively popular. A disadvantage of the flip book can be seen in the fact that the animation stops rather quickly, while the zoetrope can display animation as a continuous loop.

Eadweard Muybridge published his first chronophotography pictures in 1878. These sequential pictures were soon mounted in zoetropes by several people (including Muybridge himself) and were also published as strips for the zoetrope in the 1880s. This paved the way for the development of cinematography. Muybridge's own zoopraxiscope (1879) was an early moving image projector and one of several inventions made before the breakthrough of cinema in 1895.

In 1895 Auguste and Louis Lumière were developing the Kinora simultaneously with the cinematograph. While cinema proved to be an enormous success, the Kinora became a popular motion picture viewer for home use.

Film, television and video are seen as the prevailing successors of the zoetrope, when regarded as technological steps in the development of motion pictures. In digital media, GIF animation can arguably be seen as the closest contemporary successor of Zoetrope animation, since both usually show looped image sequences.

In 2016, an inside-out variation of the zoetrope was invented and patented with the name Silhouette Zoetrope. The device was invented by the researcher Dr. Christine Veras, and it won third place in the Best Illusion of the Year Contest, paying homage to the classical zoetrope but displaying a unique combination of optical illusions.

A digital successor to the zoetrope was invented in 2023 by Mike Ando. The Andotrope uses smartphones within a slotted cylinder to produce a 360º viewing angle for digital content.

== Contemporary media uses ==
Since the late 20th century, zoetropes have seen occasional use for artwork, entertainment, marketing and other media use, notably as linear zoetropes and 3D zoetropes (see above).

Making a zoetrope has also become a relatively common arts and crafts assignment and a means to explain some of the technical and optical principles of film and motion viewing in educational programs.

=== In popular culture ===
- Blue Man Group uses a zoetrope at their shows in Las Vegas and in the Sharp Aquos Theater in Universal Studios (in Orlando, Florida).
- The 1999 film House on Haunted Hill uses a man-sized zoetrope chamber as a twisted horror theme.
- In 2007, an image of a zoetrope was unveiled as one of BBC Two's new idents: a futuristic city with flying cars seen through the shape of the number two.

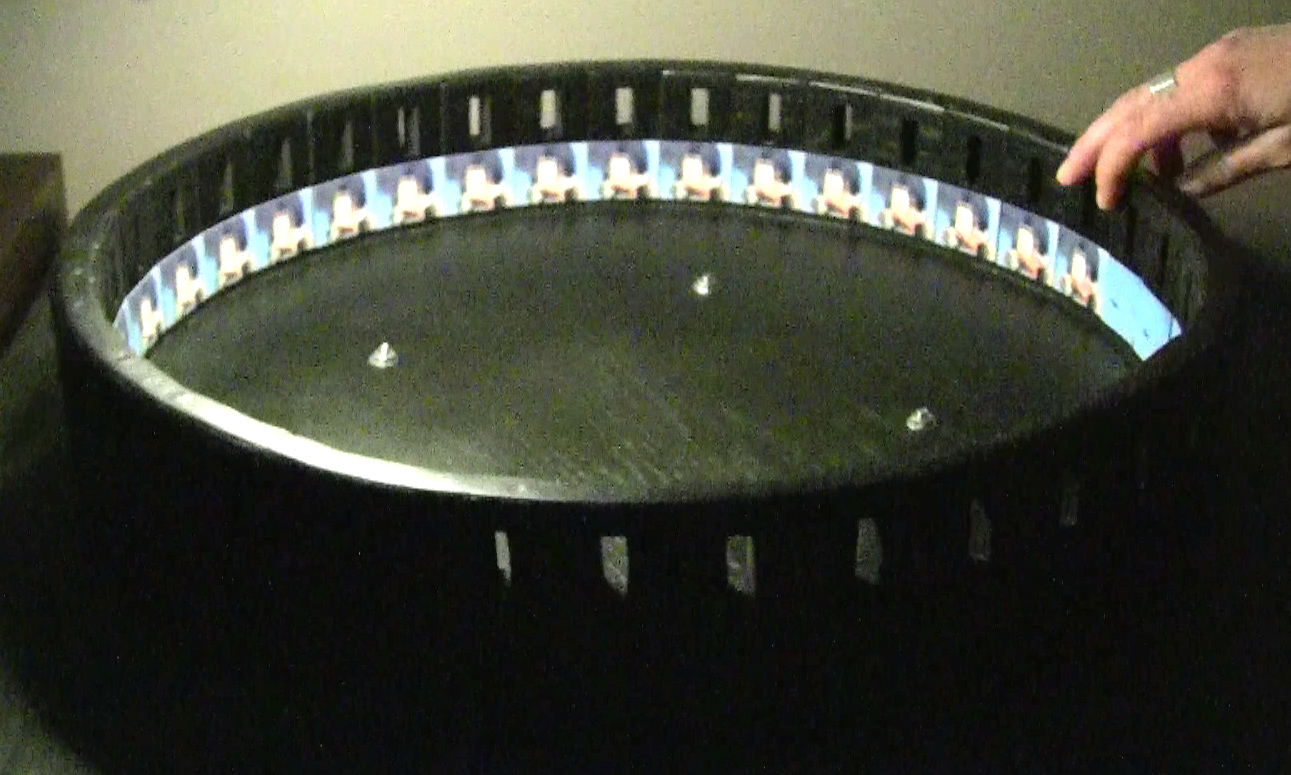
9/11 Zoetrope by Scott Blake

- In 2011, Scott Blake created a "9/11 Zoetrope" allowing viewers to watch a continuous reenactment of United Airlines Flight 175 crashing into the South Tower of the World Trade Center.
- In 2012, animation studio Sehsucht, Berlin created the opener to the 2012 MTV Europe Music Awards. The CGI animation features a 3D zoetrope that shows a story of the American Dream. The animation followed the lives of Roxxy and Seth, who, through social media and popularity reach the height of their success playing at the EMA's atop the zoetrope carousel. It was directed by Mate Steinforth and produced by Christina Geller.
- In 2013, director Jeff Zwart created a two-minute film, "Forza/Filmspeed", promoting Forza Motorsport 5. The production placed high resolution still images from the game on panels around Barber Motorsports Park and filmed them from a camera attached to a McLaren MP4-12C sports car.
- In the 2016 horror film The Conjuring 2, there is the usage of a zoetrope in one of the scenes.
- In 2019, the second season of the anime adaptation of ONE's manga Mob Psycho 100 features a 3D rendering of a zoetrope in its opening credit sequence.
- In 2022, the official music video for Pharrell Williams's song "Cash In Cash Out" makes use of a computer-animated 3D zoetrope. The video, directed by Francois Rousselet, took a little over a year to create. It features claymation-like versions of Williams, 21 Savage, and Tyler, the Creator moving through a lavish rotating set, including a jewelry-sporting detached hand playing a piano and a road paved with money.
- In 2022, the vinyl soundtrack release for Deltarune Chapter 2 featured a zoetrope etching on Side D, designed by Drew Tetz, displaying an animation of the track "Dance of Dog".
- In 2025, Lee Mendelson Film Productions released a 45 RPM Zoetrope picture disc edition of You're a Good Sport, Charlie Brown: Original Soundtrack Recording to commemorate the Peanuts franchise's 75th anniversary. Designed by Creative Associates' Chris Bracco, the vinyl features nine stroboscopic animations synchronized to spin at 45 RPM, making it the first Peanuts soundtrack release to use the Zoetrope format.

== See also ==
- Barrier-grid animation § Kinegram
- Diffractive optically variable image device (DOVIDs)
- The Horse in Motion
- Optical toys
- Phonotrope
