= 1957 in animation =

Events in 1957 in animation.

== Events ==
=== January ===
- January 5: Friz Freleng's Three Little Bops, produced by Warner Bros. Cartoons, is first released.
- January 12: Friz Freleng's Tweety and Sylvester cartoon Tweet Zoo premieres, produced by Warner Bros. Cartoons.
- January 26: Chuck Jones' Wile E. Coyote and Road Runner cartoon Scrambled Aches, produced by Warner Bros. Cartoons, is first released.

=== February ===
- February 9: Chuck Jones' Ali Baba Bunny, produced by Warner Bros. Cartoons and starring Bugs Bunny and Daffy Duck, is first released.
- February 22: William Hanna & Joseph Barbara's Tom and Jerry cartoon Tops with Pops, produced by MGM's Cartoon Studio, premieres. It is a CinemaScope remake of the 1949 Tom and Jerry short Love That Pup.

=== March ===
- March 16: Friz Freleng's Tweety and Sylvester cartoon Tweety and the Beanstalk premieres, produced by Warner Bros. Cartoons. Also starring Hector the Bulldog.
- March 20: Frank Capra's television film Hemo the Magnificent, a combination of live-action with animated sequences, premieres on CBS.
- March 27: 29th Academy Awards: The Mr. Magoo cartoon Magoo's Puddle Jumper wins the Academy Award for Best Animated Short Film.

=== April ===
- April 13: Robert McKimson's short Bedevilled Rabbit premieres, produced by Warner Bros. Cartoons, starring Bugs Bunny and the Tasmanian Devil.
- April 19: William Hanna & Joseph Barbara's Tom and Jerry cartoon Timid Tabby, produced by MGM's Cartoon Studio, premieres.

=== May ===
- May 2–17: 1957 Cannes Film Festival: The documentary film City of Gold by Colin Low and Wolf Koenig which also features animated segments, wins the Palme d'or for Best Documentary Short.
- May 4: Robert McKimson's Cheese It, the Cat! is first released, produced by Warner Bros. Cartoons. It is a parody of the TV show The Honeymooners.
- May 11: Robert McKimson's short Fox-Terror premieres, produced by Warner Bros. Cartoons, starring Foghorn Leghorn and Barnyard Dawg.
- May 15: The Metro-Goldwyn-Mayer cartoon studio closes down.
- May 25: Friz Freleng's short Piker's Peak premieres, produced by Warner Bros. Cartoons, starring Bugs Bunny and Yosemite Sam.

=== June ===
- June 7: William Hanna & Joseph Barbara's Tom and Jerry cartoon Feedin' the Kiddie, produced by MGM's Cartoon Studio, premieres. It is a CinemaScope remake of the 1949 Academy-Award winning Tom and Jerry short The Little Orphan.
- June 22: Robert McKimson's short Boston Quackie premieres, produced by Warner Bros. Cartoons, starring Daffy Duck and Porky Pig.

=== July ===
- July 6: Chuck Jones' Bugs Bunny short What's Opera, Doc? premieres, produced by Warner Bros. Cartoons, starring Bugs Bunny and Elmer Fudd. Though not remarkably popular at first, it will eventually become one of the most acclaimed cartoons of all time.
- July 7: William Hanna, Joseph Barbera, and George Sidney establish their own TV animation studio: Hanna-Barbera.
- July 20: Robert McKimson's Speedy Gonzales short Tabasco Road premieres, produced by Warner Bros. Cartoons, starring Speedy Gonzales.

=== August ===
- August 10: Friz Freleng's Tweety and Sylvester cartoon Birds Anonymous premieres, produced by Warner Bros. Cartoons. Also starring Sam Cat. This short later won an Academy Award.
- August 17: Robert McKimson's short Ducking the Devil premieres, produced by Warner Bros. Cartoons, starring Daffy Duck and the Tasmanian Devil.
- August 28: Wolfgang Reitherman's The Truth About Mother Goose, produced by Walt Disney Animation Studios, premieres.
- August 31: Friz Freleng's short Bugsy and Mugsy, produced by Warner Bros. Cartoons and starring Bugs Bunny, Rocky and Mugsy, is first released.

=== September ===
- September 6: William Hanna & Joseph Barbara's Tom and Jerry cartoon Mucho Mouse, produced by MGM's Cartoon Studio, premieres.
- September 14: Chuck Jones' Wile E. Coyote and Road Runner cartoon Zoom and Bored, produced by Warner Bros. Cartoons, is first released.
- September 21: Colonel Bleep, the first animated TV series in colour debuts. The show was originally syndicated on September 21, 1957, as a segment on Uncle Bill's TV Club.
- September 28: Friz Freleng's Tweety and Sylvester cartoon Greedy for Tweety premieres, produced by Warner Bros. Cartoons. Also starring Granny and Hector the Bulldog.

=== October ===
- October 3: The first episode of The Woody Woodpecker Show is broadcast.
- October 12: Chuck Jones' Pepé Le Pew cartoon Touché and Go premieres, produced by Warner Bros. Cartoons. Also starring Penelope Pussycat.

=== November ===
- November 1:
  - Lev Atamanov and Nikolay Fyodorov's The Snow Queen is first released.
  - William Hanna & Joseph Barbara's Tom and Jerry cartoon Tom's Photo Finish, produced by MGM's Cartoon Studio, premieres.
- November 2: Friz Freleng's Show Biz Bugs, starring Bugs Bunny and Daffy Duck, produced by Warner Bros. Cartoons, premieres.
- November 16: Robert McKimson's Sylvester and Hippety Hopper cartoon Mouse-Taken Identity premieres, produced by Warner Bros. Cartoons. Also starring Sylvester Jr.
- November 28: The first episode of Hergé's Adventures of Tintin by Ray Goossens and animation studio Belvision, airs on television. This is the first hand-drawn animated television adaptation of the comics series The Adventures of Tintin by Hergé.
- November 30: Friz Freleng's Speedy Gonzales cartoon Gonzales' Tamales premieres, produced by Warner Bros. Cartoons, starring Speedy Gonzales & Sylvester the Cat.

=== December ===
- December 14:
  - Robert McKimson's Rabbit Romeo premieres, produced by Warner Bros. Cartoons, starring Bugs Bunny. and Elmer Fudd.
  - The first Hanna-Barbera animated television series airs on American television: The Ruff and Reddy Show.

=== Specific date unknown ===
- Zdeněk Miler launches his animated television series The Little Mole.
- The animated musical advertisement Let's All Go to the Lobby, directed by Dave Fleischer, is first played in theaters. It plays before intermissions in theaters.

== Films released ==
- January 20 - The Big Fun Carnival (United States)
- March 20 - Hemo the Magnificent (United States)
- December 31 - The Snow Queen (Soviet Union)

== Television series ==
- June 10 - Tom Terrific debuts in syndication.
- August 22 - Captain Pugwash debuts on BBC.
- October 3 - The Woody Woodpecker Show debuts on ABC.
- December 14 - The Ruff and Reddy Show debuts on NBC.
- Specific date unknown - Colonel Bleep debuts in syndication.

== Births ==
=== January ===
- January 5: Charlie Brissette, American singer (voice of various characters in The Ren & Stimpy Show, Singer in the Time Squad episode "Recruitment Ad", choir performer in The Angry Beavers), composer (Nickelodeon Animation Studio, Sitting Ducks, composed and performed the theme for Pet Alien), songwriter (The Ren & Stimpy Show) and arranger (Sesame Street).
- January 8: Ron Cephas Jones, American actor (voice of Captain Aldo in the Amphibia episode "Barrel's Warhammer"), (d. 2023).
- January 11: Andrey Ignatenko, Russian animator (The Tale of Tsar Saltan, The Adventures of Lolo the Penguin, Varga Studio), (d. 2021).
- January 12: John Lasseter, American animator, screenwriter, producer, and director (Walt Disney Animation Studios, Pixar, Skydance Animation).
- January 15: David Pruiksma, American animator (Walt Disney Animation Studios), storyboard artist, writer and director (Hi Hi Puffy AmiYumi).
- January 16: Joey Camen, American voice actor (voice of Natural Smurf in The Smurfs, Stegmutt in Darkwing Duck, Greg Egan in Eureka Seven, Chris Carter in Creepy Crawlers).
- January 25: Jenifer Lewis, American actress (voice of Mama Odie in The Princess and the Frog, Flo in the Cars franchise, Bebe Ho in The PJs, Professor Granville in Big Hero 6: The Series, Patty in The Ghost and Molly McGee).
- January 29: Diane Delano, American actress (voice of Ma Vreedle in the Ben 10 franchise, Tuba in Infinity Train, Stompa in Superman: The Animated Series, Pantha in Teen Titans, Big Barda in the Batman: The Brave and the Bold episode "The Last Bat on Earth!", Captain Nekton in the Niko and the Sword of Light episode "Sky Whale City"), (d. 2024).

=== February ===
- February 1: Renae Jacobs, American voice actress (voice of April O'Neil in Teenage Mutant Ninja Turtles).
- February 4: Don Davis, American composer, conductor, and orchestrator (Tiny Toon Adventures: How I Spent My Vacation, The Animatrix, We're back! A Dinosaur's Story, Thumbelina, The Pagemaster, Balto, A Goofy Movie, Pixar, James and the Giant Peach, Capitol Critters, Taz-Mania).
- February 6: Kathy Najimy, American actress (voice of Peggy Hill in King of the Hill, Madame Blanche in Hey Arnold!, Taqqiq in Brother Bear 2, Coach Doogan and Margot LeSandre in Pepper Ann, continued voice of Mrs. Shapiro in Little Bill).
- February 10: Sally Dryer, American voice actress (voice of Violet, Lucy Van Pelt, and Patty in the Peanuts franchise).
- February 16: LeVar Burton, American actor (voice of Kwame in Captain Planet and the Planeteers and the OK K.O.! Let's Be Heroes episode "The Power Is Yours", Anansi in Gargoyles, Dr. Consilium in Miles from Tomorrowland, Doc Greene in Transformers: Rescue Bots, Black Lightning in Superman/Batman: Public Enemies, Rhodey Rhodes / War Machine in The Super Hero Squad Show episode "Tales of Suspense!", himself in the Family Guy episode "Not All Dogs Go to Heaven").
- February 19: Ray Winstone, English actor (voice of Papa Bear in Puss in Boots: The Last Wish, Bad Bill in Rango, Tyson in The Queen's Corgi).
- February 20: Lia Sargent, American voice actress (voice of Milly Thompson in Trigun, R. Dorothy Waynewright in The Big O, Chun Li in the Street Fighter franchise, Judy in Cowboy Bebop, Lisa Sakakino in éX-Driver).
- February 25: Miroslaw Zbrojewicz, Polish actor (Polish dub voice of Mr. Krabs in SpongeBob SquarePants, Mr. Freeze and Hal Jordan in The Batman, John Stewart in Justice League and Justice League Unlimited, Einstein in Oliver & Company).
- February 27:
  - Danny Antonucci, Canadian animator, director, producer, and writer (creator of Ed, Edd n Eddy, The Brothers Grunt, and Lupo the Butcher).
  - Kevin Curran, American television writer and producer (The Simpsons), (d. 2016).
  - Timothy Spall, English actor (voice of Nick in Chicken Run, Nathaniel in Enchanted, Chief Bognar in Early Man).

=== March ===
- March 3: David Shaughnessy, English actor (voice of Heathcliff in Big Hero 6, and Big Hero 6: The Series, Cates in The Tom and Jerry Show, Msamaki in Cleopatra in Space, Gentleman Starkey in Peter Pan & the Pirates, Drell in Star Wars Resistance, Aresko in Star Wars Rebels, Ulysses Klaue in Avengers Assemble, Etrigan in the Young Justice episode "Nomed Esir!").
- March 5: Bridget Hoffman, American actress (voice of Lain Iwakura in Serial Experiments Lain, Nia Teppelin in Gurren Lagann, Irisveil von Einzbern in Fate/Zero, Yukari Takara in Lucky Star, Ryoko Asakura in Haruhi Suzumiya, Crystal in ParaNorman).
- March 6: Eddie Deezen, American actor and comedian (portrayed himself in the SpongeBob SquarePants episode "Truth or Square", voice of Know-It-All Kid in The Polar Express, Mandark in Dexter's Laboratory, Snipes in Rock-a-Doodle, Ham, Sam and Kam in Mother Goose and Grimm, Ringo in Eek! The Cat, Iggy Catalp in Duckman, Caliph in Scooby-Doo! in Arabian Nights, Melvin in Life with Louie, Charlie in The Brave Little Toaster to the Rescue, Andy Pumpkin in Oswald, Larry in Lloyd in Space, Ned in Kim Possible, Gibby Norton in What's New, Scooby-Doo?, Bahuka in the Timon & Pumbaa episode "Oahu Wahoo", Alvin Yasbek in the Mighty Ducks: The Animated Series episode "Mondo-Man", Tex Hardbottom in The Lionhearts episode "Brown Dog Day", the title character in The Secret Files of the Spy Dogs episode "D'Cell", Oswald in the Johnny Bravo episode "Johnny Goes to Camp", Frank Sedgwick in the Recess episode "Lord of the Nerds", Todd in the Chowder episode "Sheboodles", Carlton J. Stankmeyer in the Pound Puppies episode "The Yipper Caper", Zip in the Handy Manny episode "Hank's Birthday", Squares in the Star vs. the Forces of Evil episode "Party with a Pony", Ped in the Transformers: Robots in Disguise episode "Can You Dig It?", Cartoon Peepers in the Wander Over Yonder episode "The Cartoon", additional voices in The Pink Panther).
- March 7: Susan Odjakjian, American animator (Disney Television Animation, Warner Bros. Animation, Adventures of Sonic the Hedgehog, Captain Planet and the Planeteers, Captain N: The Game Master).
- March 11:
  - Antonio Zurera, Spanish animator (The Charlie Brown and Snoopy Show, Asterix, Benjamin Blümchen, Bibi Blocksberg), storyboard artist (Hurricanes, Pippi Longstocking, Madeline: Lost in Paris, Courage the Cowardly Dog), writer, director and producer (Dragon Hill, la colina del dragón, The Magic Cube, RH+, the Vampire of Seville, Dragon Guardians).
  - Yukio Yamagata, Japanese singer and actor (voice of Torry Aaes in Mobile Suit Victory Gundam), (d. 2026).
- March 15:
  - David Silverman, American animator (The Simpsons) and director (Monsters, Inc., The Simpsons, Extinct, Warner Bros. Animation).
  - Joaquim de Almeida, Portuguese actor (voice of Bane in The Batman episode "Traction", Román Calzado in the Archer episode "El Contador", Portuguese dub voice of Tai Lung in Kung Fu Panda, El Macho in Despicable Me 2, and the Mighty Eagle in The Angry Birds Movie).
- March 20: Chris Wedge, American film director, producer, writer, animator and cartoonist (Blue Sky Studios).
- March 22: Max Pross, American television writer (The Critic, The Simpsons) and producer (The Critic, Futurama, The Simpsons, Napoleon Dynamite).
- March 23:
  - Teresa Ganzel, American actress and comedienne (voice of Miss Vavoom in Tom and Jerry Kids and Droopy, Master Detective, Loulabelle in Cow & Chicken and I Am Weasel, Kitty Glitter in Top Cat and the Beverly Hills Cats, Colleen McNulty in Rugrats, Liza in Clifford's Really Big Movie).
  - Amanda Plummer, American actress (voice of Clotho in the Hercules franchise, Lady Redundant Woman in WordGirl, Professor Poofenplotz in Phineas and Ferb, Princess Fallopia in the Duckman episode "The Road to Dendron").
- March 28: Paul Eiding, American actor (voice of Max Tennyson, Blukic, Liam, and Eye Guy in the Ben 10 franchise, Perceptor in The Transformers, Jonathan Kent in the DC Animated Movie Universe and Superman vs. The Elite, No-Zone in Toxic Crusaders, Scorp in Challenge of the GoBots).
- March 29: Davis Doi, American animator (Marvel Productions, Garbage Pail Kids), director (The Real Adventures of Jonny Quest, SD Entertainment, The Land Before Time XIV: Journey of the Brave, Curious George) and producer (Hanna-Barbera, Care Bears: Unlock the Magic, Boy Girl Dog Cat Mouse Cheese).
- March 30: Brian Hohlfeld, American screenwriter (Winnie the Pooh, Transformers).
- March 31: Terry Klassen, Canadian voice actor and director (voice of Sylvester the Cat in Baby Looney Tunes, Maurice Squab in The Wacky World of Tex Avery, Milton Huxley in Mummies Alive!, Tusky Husky in Krypto the Superdog, Impossible Man in Fantastic Four: World's Greatest Heroes, Krillin in the Ocean dub of Dragon Ball Z, Von Reichter in Cybersix).

=== April ===
- April 1:
  - Andreas Deja, Polish-born German-American animator (Walt Disney Animation Studios).
  - Bill Freiberger, American television producer, writer, and voice actor (The PJs, Baby Blues, The Simpsons, 3-South, Greg the Bunny, Drawn Together, Rekkit Rabbit, Sonic Boom).
- April 5: Tasia Valenza, American actress (voice of Maria Amino in Ozzy & Drix, Jade in The Real Adventures of Jonny Quest, Mariam in the Batman: The Animated Series episode "Baby-Doll").
- April 14: Richard Jeni, American comedian and actor (voice of Host in the Batman: The Animated Series episode "Make 'Em Laugh", himself in the Dr. Katz, Professional Therapist episode "Monte Carlo"), (d. 2007).
- April 18: Lolee Aries, American television producer and production manager (Film Roman, Nickelodeon Animation Studio, MoonScoop), (d. 2018).
- April 22: Yôko Kawanami, Japanese voice actress (voice of Bulma's Mother in the Dragon Ball franchise, Arcee in Transformers: The Headmasters, Mrs. Bellum in Powerpuff Girls Z), (d. 2025).
- April 23: Jan Hooks, American actress and comedian (voice of Lil in Frosty Returns, Manjula Nahasapeemapetilon in The Simpsons, Angleyne in the Futurama episode "Bendless Love", Nadine in the Game Over episode "Monkey Dearest", Mrs. Kellogg in The Cleveland Show episode "Mr. & Mrs. Brown"), (d. 2014).

=== May ===
- May 5: Richard E. Grant, Swazi-English actor (voice of Lord Barkis Bittern in Corpse Bride, The Doctor in Scream of the Shalka, John the Baptist in The Miracle Maker, Campbell Babbitt in Jackboots on Whitehall, Cecil in Zambezia, Bradley in Khumba, Magpie in Robin Robin, The Mandrake in Earwig and the Witch, Roger Swindon/Elgen in Wildwood, the title character in Captain Star, Holland in Tuca & Bertie, The Gardener in Moley).
- May 13: Mark Heap, English actor and comedian (voice of Eric Feeble in Stressed Eric).
- May 16: Philo Barnhart, American animator (Walt Disney Animation Studios, The Smurfs, The Secret of NIMH).
- May 18: Rob Bartlett, American actor (voice of Marty the Dog in Kenny the Shark).
- May 19: Tom Gammill, American television writer and producer (The Critic, The Simpsons, Futurama, Napoleon Dynamite).
- May 21: Judge Reinhold, American actor (voice of Larry Gablegobble in Clifford's Really Big Movie, Negative Man in the Teen Titans episode "Homecoming", Judge Reinhold in the Clerks: The Animated Series episode "A Dissertation on the American Justice System by People Who Have Never Been Inside a Courtroom, Let Alone Know Anything About the Law, but Have Seen Way Too Many Legal Thrillers").
- May 22: Ken Pontac, American television writer (Gumby Adventures, Mighty Max, Extreme Dinosaurs, The Legend of Calamity Jane, ReBoot, Sherlock Holmes in the 22nd Century, LazyTown, ¡Mucha Lucha!, ToddWorld, Happy Tree Friends, Krypto the Superdog, Pet Alien, The Secret Show, Storm Hawks, Arthur, Generator Rex, Matt Hatter Chronicles, Slugterra, Octonauts, Pac-Man and the Ghostly Adventures, Kong: King of the Apes, Curious George, Mighty Express, creator of Bump in the Night).
- May 23: Iona Morris, American actress (voice of Claudia Grant in the Robotech franchise, Medusa in Fantastic Four, Principal Stringent in ChalkZone, first voice of Storm in X-Men: The Animated Series).
- May 29: Ted Levine, American actor (voice of Sinestro in the DC Animated Universe).

=== June ===
- June 8: Scott Adams, American cartoonist and producer (Dilbert), (d. 2026).
- June 13: Scott Page-Pagter, American voice actor, television producer, composer, sound effects artist and voice director (Saban Entertainment), (d. 2021).
- June 16: Ian Buchanan, Scottish actor (voice of Ultra-Humanite in Justice League, Constantine in the Gargoyles episode "Avalon", Abel Cuvier in the Batman Beyond episode "Splicers", Sherlock Holmes in the Batman: The Brave and the Bold episode "Trials of the Demon!").
- June 19: Barry Caldwell, American artist (Animaniacs, Pinky and the Brain, Tiny Toons, The Smurfs), (d. 2026).
- June 21: Berkley Breathed, American cartoonist, children's book, author director, and screenwriter (A Wish for Wings That Work, Hitpig!).
- June 23: Frances McDormand, American actress (voice of Captain Chantel DuBois in Madagascar 3: Europe's Most Wanted, Momma in The Good Dinosaur, Interpreter Nelson in Isle of Dogs).

=== July ===
- July 2: Bret Hart, Canadian-American retired professional wrestler (voiced himself in The Simpsons episode "The Old Man and the Lisa", the title character in the Jacob Two-Two episode "The Hooded Fang", The Bad Mechanic in the Corner Gas Animated episode "Sound and Fury").
- July 3: Billy Aronson, American playwright, production assistant (Defenders of the Earth), television producer and writer (Video Power, Space Ghost Coast to Coast, Beavis and Butt-Head, Courage the Cowardly Dog, Codename: Kids Next Door, Postcards from Buster, Wonder Pets!, The Backyardigans, Octonauts, co-creator of Peg + Cat).
- July 17: Aleksandr Petrov, Russian animator and animation director.
- July 21:
  - Jon Lovitz, American actor and comedian (voice of Jay Sherman in The Critic and The Simpsons, Radio in The Brave Little Toaster, T.R. Chula in An American Tail: Fievel Goes West, Tom Blazer in Eight Crazy Nights, Quasimodo in Hotel Transylvania, The Phantom of the Opera in Hotel Transylvania 2, Queen Gabnidine in the Randy Cunningham: 9th Grade Ninja episode "To Smell and Back", Sid Sharp in the Justice League Action episode "Superman's Pal, Sid Sharp", Artie Ziff, Llewellyn Sinclair and Enrico Irritazio in The Simpsons ).
  - Sherie Pollack, American animator (Pinocchio and the Emperor of the Night, FernGully: The Last Rainforest), sheet timer (Bobby's World, Aaahh!!! Real Monsters, The Simpsons, Duckman, Jumanji, Dora the Explorer, Cartoon Network Studios, Rocko's Modern Life: Static Cling, Amphibia) and director (Pepper Ann, God, the Devil and Bob, Nickelodeon Animation Studio, Mickey Mouse Clubhouse, We Bare Bears, We Baby Bears).
- July 28: Brianne Leary, American actress, inventor and television writer (co-creator of Stickin' Around).

=== August ===
- August 1: Taylor Negron, American actor (voice of Starfinger in the Legion of Super Heroes episode "The Substitutes"), (d. 2015).
- August 3:
  - Carol Goldwasser, American casting director (American Dad!), (d. 2024).
  - Kathleen Quaife-Hodge, American animator (Walt Disney Animation Studios, Sullivan Bluth Studios, Universal Cartoon Studios, FernGully: The Last Rainforest, The Thief and the Cobbler, Asterix in America, The Pagemaster, Warner Bros. Feature Animation, Hanna-Barbera, Nickelodeon Animation Studio, God, the Devil and Bob, The Proud Family, I Want a Dog for Christmas, Charlie Brown, Mickey, Donald, Goofy: The Three Musketeers, Da Boom Crew, Bah, Humduck! A Looney Tunes Christmas, Slacker Cats), (d. 2021).
- August 7: Paul Dini, American screenwriter (Warner Bros. Animation).
- August 13: David Lewman, American television writer (3-South, Drawn Together, George of the Jungle, Yin Yang Yo!, Spaceballs: The Animated Series, Kick Buttowski: Suburban Daredevil, Fresh Beat Band of Spies, Rolling with the Ronks!).
- August 18: Denis Leary, American actor and comedian (voice of Diego in the Ice Age franchise, Francis in A Bug's Life, himself in The Simpsons episode "Lost Verizon").
- August 19: Tom McLaughlin, American animator (Eureeka's Castle), storyboard artist (The Adventures of the Galaxy Rangers, Duckman, Jumanji, DIC Entertainment), sheet timer (Warner Bros. Animation, BattleTech: The Animated Series, Aaahh!!! Real Monsters, Teenage Mutant Ninja Turtles, Iznogoud, Dino Babies, Darkstalkers, Biker Mice from Mars, Bureau of Alien Detectors, X-Men: The Animated Series, Men in Black: The Series, The Legend of Tarzan, DIC Entertainment, Cartoon Network Studios, Pet Alien, Wolverine and the X-Men, Avengers Assemble, Kaijudo), director (Space Strikers, Jumanji, Silver Surfer) and producer (Silver Surfer), (d. 2013).
- August 24: Stephen Fry, English actor, broadcaster, comedian, director, narrator and writer (voice of Cheshire the Cheshire Cat in Alice in Wonderland and Alice Through the Looking Glass, Frazier in Duck Duck Goose, Lord Piggot-Dunceby in Missing Link, Leonardo da Vinci in The Inventor, Cowslip in Watership Down, narrator in Pocoyo, Mr. Tolly in Peter Rabbit, Mr. Cavendish and John Michael Heaton in American Dad!, Lord Stag in Lily's Driftwood Bay, Colonel K in Danger Mouse, Onion's Dad in Apple & Onion, Waddleton Crutchley in the Mickey Mouse Mixed-Up Adventures episode "Shennanygan", Terrance in The Simpsons episode "The Man from G.R.A.M.P.A.").
- August 25: Simon McBurney, English actor, playwright, and theatrical director (voice of Oliver Cromwell in Wolfwalkers).
- August 26: R.J. Colleary, American television producer and writer (Coconut Fred's Fruit Salad Island, The Fairly OddParents, Bunsen Is a Beast).
- August 28: Daniel Stern, American actor, artist, director and screenwriter (voice of the title character in Dilbert, Mr. Packenham in the Hey Arnold! episode "Teachers Strike", narrator in the Family Guy episode "Fox-y Lady" and The Simpsons episode "Three Men and a Comic Book").

=== September ===
- September 1: Roy Meurin, Canadian animator (Nelvana, Asterix and the Big Fight, An American Tail: Fievel Goes West, FernGully: The Last Rainforest, Cool World, The Thief and the Cobbler, The Critic, Walt Disney Animation Studios, The Iron Giant, The Tigger Movie, Rugrats Go Wild), storyboard artist (Nelvana, Disney Television Animation, Nickelodeon Animation Studio, Alvin and the Chipmunks, The Swan Princess, The Simpsons, Hyperion Pictures, Rugrats, The Hunchback of Notre Dame II, Jakers! The Adventures of Piggley Winks, Clifford's Puppy Days, Curious George, Duncanville), sheet timer (Rugrats, The Tigger Movie) and director (The Care Bears Family, Rugrats, Rocko's Modern Life).
- September 3: Mak Wilson, English puppeteer, actor and voice actor (voice of Lug and Scooch in Construction Site).
- September 12: Hans Zimmer, German composer (The Lion King, DreamWorks Animation, The Simpsons Movie, Rango, The SpongeBob Movie: Sponge on the Run, Twilight of the Gods).
- September 13: Nicolas Carr, American composer and music editor (DIC Entertainment, Marvel Productions, Saban Entertainment, Disney Television Animation, She-Ra: Princess of Power, Little Dracula, ¡Mucha Lucha!, SpongeBob SquarePants, Camp Lazlo, Action League Now!).
- September 19:
  - Mark Acheson, Canadian actor (voice of Tirek in My Little Pony: Friendship Is Magic, Fisto in He-Man and the Masters of the Universe, Orion in the Class of the Titans episode "Star Quality", Marvin Mosasaurus in the Dinosaur Train episode "Maisie Mosasaurus").
  - Russell Velázquez, Puerto Rican-born American actor (voice of Captain Chaser in One Piece, additional voices in Team Umizoomi) and composer (4Kids Entertainment, Play with Me Sesame, Sesame Street).
  - Stephen Hibbert, American screenwriter (Darkwing Duck, Tiny Toon Adventures, Animaniacs, Shrek), (d. 2026).
- September 24: Brad Bird, American film director, animator, screenwriter, producer and voice actor (The Simpsons, The Iron Giant, Pixar).
- September 25:
  - Michael McGrath, American actor (voice of Adult Brendan in The Secret of Kells, additional voices in Wolfwalkers), (d. 2023).
  - Michael Madsen, American actor (voice of Kilowog in Green Lantern: First Flight, Duke in Arctic Dogs, Kevin Costner in the Bob's Burgers episode "Moody Foodie"), (d. 2025).
- September 26: Bob Staake, American cartoonist, illustrator, author, character designer, and storyboard artist (Cartoon Network Studios).
- September 28: Aleksandr Boyarsky, Russian producer, screenwriter, voice actor, and composer (CEO of Melnitsa Animation Studio).
- September 30: Fran Drescher, American actress, comedian, writer, activist and trade union leader (voice of Pearl in Shark Bait, Eunice in the Hotel Transylvania franchise, Female Golem in The Simpsons episode "Treehouse of Horror XVII", Arlene Stein in the Glenn Martin, DDS episode "Dad News Bears", The Empress in the Planet Sheen episode "Nightmare Sheenario", Encyclopedia in The 7D episode "Once in a Purple Moon", Barbara Wasserman in the Welcome to the Wayne episode "Welcome to the Wassermans").

=== October ===
- October 2: Joy Rosen, American executive (co-founder of Portfolio Entertainment), (d. 2023).
- October 4: Bill Fagerbakke, American actor and comedian (voice of Patrick Star in the SpongeBob SquarePants franchise, Broadway in Gargoyles, Polar Bear in The Madagascar Penguins in a Christmas Caper, Frosty the Snowman in The Legend of Frosty the Snowman, Scarecrow in Dorothy and the Wizard of Oz, Bulkhead in Transformers: Animated, Ronnie Raymond in Batman: The Brave and the Bold, the Ghost of Christmas Present in the DuckTales episode "Last Christmas!").
- October 5: Bernie Mac, American actor and comedian (voice of Fruit Juice in Lil' Pimp, Gadgetmobile in Inspector Gadget's Biggest Caper Ever, Zuba in Madagascar: Escape 2 Africa, Mack in the King of the Hill episode "Racist Dawg"), (d. 2008).
- October 8: Yoichiro Yoshikawa, Japanese composer (ViVid Strike), (d. 2026).
- October 10:
  - David Lodge, American actor (voice of Jiraiya in Naruto, Igor in Persona 5: The Animation, Tenderheart Bear in Care Bears: Welcome to Care-a-Lot and Care Bears and Cousins, Kaztano in Durarara!!, Kenpachi Zaraki in Bleach, Tharok and the Controller in Legion of Super Heroes, Calythos in the Justice League Action episode "Power Outage").
  - Rumiko Takahashi, Japanese manga artist (Inuyasha, Urusei Yatsura, Ranma ½).
- October 11: Dawn French, British actress, comedian, presenter and writer (voice of Miss Miriam Forcible in Coraline, Angie in Animals United, Sister Marie in The Magician's Elephant).
- October 24: John Kassir, American actor and comedian (voice of the Cryptkeeper in Tales from the Cryptkeeper, Ray Rocket in Rocket Power, Zombozo in Ben 10, Henchrat in Earthworm Jim, Alfred Nobel, Rasputin, and Thomas Jefferson in Time Squad, Scrooge McDuck in Mickey Mouse and The Wonderful World of Mickey Mouse, Pete Puma in The Looney Tunes Show, continued voice of Buster Bunny in Tiny Toon Adventures).
- October 25: Nancy Cartwright, American voice actress (voice of Bart Simpson, Nelson Muntz, Ralph Wiggum and other various characters in The Simpsons, Mindy in Animaniacs, Fawn Deer in Raw Toonage and Bonkers, Rufus in Kim Possible, Gloria Glad in Richie Rich, Pistol in Goof Troop, Bright Eyes in Pound Puppies, Toon Shoe in Who Framed Roger Rabbit, continued voice of Chuckie Finster in Rugrats).
- October 29: Dan Castellaneta, American voice actor (voice of Homer Simpson, Grampa Simpson, Barney Gumble, Krusty the Clown, Sideshow Mel, Groundskeeper Willie, Mayor Quimby, and other various characters in The Simpsons, Megavolt in Darkwing Duck, the title character in Earthworm Jim, Grandpa Phil in Hey Arnold!, Earl in Cow and Chicken, Robot Devil in Futurama, Mr. Thickley in Taz-Mania, Doc Brown in Back to the Future: The Animated Series, continued voice of Genie in the Aladdin franchise).
- October 30:
  - Kevin Pollak, American actor (voice of Fracture in Transformers: Robots in Disguise, Joker and Jonathan Kent in Injustice, Ross in The Simpsons episode "3 Scenes Plus a Tag from a Marriage").
  - Rochelle Linder, American office manager (Family Guy, American Dad!, The Cleveland Show), (d. 2017).
- October 31: Brian Stokes Mitchell, American actor (voice of the Nowhere King in Centaurworld, Grandpop in Vampirina, Danny Wood in New Kids on the Block, Coach Mitchell in James Bond Jr., singing voice of Jethro in The Prince of Egypt).

=== November ===
- November 3: Dolph Lundgren, Swedish actor and martial artist (voice of Svengeance in Minions: The Rise of Gru, himself in the Sanjay and Craig episode "Huggle Day").
- November 6: Cam Clarke, American actor (voice of Leonardo and Rocksteady in Teenage Mutant Ninja Turtles, Snoopy in Snoopy!!! The Musical, Heath Burns in the Monster High franchise, Whirly Bird in Special Agent Oso, He-Man in He-Man and the Masters of the Universe, Simba in Timon & Pumbaa and House of Mouse, Die Fledermaus in The Tick, Mister Fantastic in Spider-Man, Doc Samson in The Avengers: Earth's Mightiest Heroes).
- November 7: Christopher Knight, American actor (voice of Peter Brady in the first season of The Brady Kids).
- November 10: George Lowe, American voice actor and comedian (voice of Space Ghost in Space Ghost Coast to Coast and Cartoon Planet), (d. 2025).
- November 18: Joey Miyashima, American actor (voice of Toshiro in The Simpsons episode "One Fish, Two Fish, Blowfish, Blue Fish", additional voices in The Karate Kid).
- November 19: Ofra Haza, Israeli singer, actress, recording artist, writer and journalist (voice of Yocheved and performed the song "Deliver Us" in The Prince of Egypt), (d. 2000).
- November 22: Mackenzie Gray, Canadian actor (voice of Obadiah Stane in Iron Man: Armored Adventures, Rick in Barbie: Thumbelina).
- November 26: Darrell McNeil, American animator, writer, editor, publisher, producer and actor (Hanna-Barbera, Filmation, Ralph Bakshi, Ruby-Spears, Walt Disney Company, Warner Bros. Animation, Don Bluth), (d. 2018).

=== December ===
- December 2: Gil Alkabetz, Israeli animator, writer, producer and director (Bitz Butz, Swamp, Yankale, Rubicon, Travel to China, Trim Time, Morir de amor, Ein sonniger Tag, Wollmond, Der Da Vinci Timecode, 1 + 1, One Stormy Night, designed the animated scenes for Run Lola Run), (d. 2022).
- December 5: Thomas Schumacher, American producer (Walt Disney Company).
- December 9: Donny Osmond, American dancer, singer, television host, and former teen idol (singing voice of Li Shang in Mulan, voiced himself in The Osmonds and Johnny Bravo).
- December 10: Michael Clarke Duncan, American actor (voice of Tug in Brother Bear and Brother Bear 2, Big Daddy in The Land Before Time XI: Invasion of the Tinysauruses, Future Wade in Kim Possible: A Sitch in Time, Massive in Loonatics Unleashed, Elder Marley in Delgo, Commander Vachir in Kung Fu Panda, Guardian Cat in the Fish Hooks episode "Labor of Love", Groot in the Ultimate Spider-Man episode "Guardians of the Galaxy", Kingpin in the Spider-Man: The New Animated Series episode "Royal Scam", Coach Webb in the King of the Hill episode "The Son Also Roses", Mongo in The Proud Family episode "Smackmania 6: Mongo vs. Mama's Boy", Rashid "The Rocket" Randell in the Static Shock episode "Linked", Rockwell in The Fairly OddParents episode "Crash Nebula", Krall in the Teen Titans episode "Cyborg the Barbarian"), (d. 2012).
- December 11: Carlos Meglia, Argentine animator and comics artist (Hanna-Barbera), (d. 2008).
- December 12:
  - Jon Kenny, Irish comedian and actor (voice of Ferry Dan and The Great Seanachaí in Song of the Sea, Stringy Woodcutter and Ned in Wolfwalkers), (d. 2024).
  - Naoki Bandō, Japanese voice actor (voice of Gato in Naruto, Centichoro in One-Punch Man, Hiroshi Uzaki in Nurse Angel Ririka SOS, Otis in Mobile Suit Victory Gundam, Japanese dub voice of Muggsy Bogues in Space Jam, Doctor Sivana in Batman: The Brave and the Bold), (d. 2026).
- December 13: Steve Buscemi, American actor (voice of Randall Boggs in the Monsters, Inc. franchise, Neil Fleming in Final Fantasy: The Spirits Within, Wesley in Home on the Range, Horace Nebbercracker in Monster House, Scamper in Igor, Wayne in the Hotel Transylvania franchise, Francis Francis in The Boss Baby, Starscream in Transformers One, Dwight in The Simpsons episode "I Don't Wanna Know Why the Caged Bird Sings", Tom Innocenti in the Bob's Burgers episode "Sexy Dance Healing", Dorsal Dan in the SpongeBob SquarePants episode "The Getaway", Saloso in the Elena of Avalor episode "The Tides of Change", Eddie in the Rick and Morty episode "A Rickconvenient Mort", himself in The Simpsons episode "Brake My Wife, Please" and the Scooby-Doo and Guess Who? episode "Fear of the Fire Beast!").
- December 15: Chō, Japanese actor (voice of Brook in One Piece, Penguin in Batman Ninja, Japanese dub voice of Dark Lord Chuckles in Dave the Barbarian, Mason in the Madagascar franchise, Green Goblin in Spider-Man Unlimited).
- December 21: Ray Romano, American actor and comedian (voice of Manny in the Ice Age franchise, Ray in Dr. Katz, Professional Therapist, Ray Magini in The Simpsons episode "Don't Fear the Roofer").
- December 28: Yoshiji Kigami, Japanese director (MUNTO), animator (Akira, A Silent Voice), and member of Kyoto Animation, (d. 2019).
- December 29: Brad Grey, American producer (Sammy), (d. 2017).
- December 30: Matt Lauer, American former television news personality (voice of Hark Hanson in Curious George 2: Follow That Monkey!, himself in the Father of the Pride episode "Larry's Debut, and Sweet Darryl Hannah Too").

=== Specific date unknown ===
- J. R. Williams, American cartoonist, animator, and fine artist (Will Vinton Studios).
- Rick Jones, Canadian voice actor, voice director, writer and content developer.
- Richard McGuire, American illustrator, comic book artist, author and musician (created Dash and Dot for PBS Kids).
- Tom Minton, American animator, producer, writer, and storyboard artist (Warner Bros. Animation, Mighty Mouse: The New Adventures, Phineas and Ferb).
- Mark Mancina, American film composer (Walt Disney Company, The Sea Beast, Blood+).

== Deaths ==
=== February ===
- February 5: Ben Hardaway, American animator (Looney Tunes, worked for Walter Lantz), dies at age 61.

=== March ===
- March 1: A.C. Hutchison, American comics artist and animator (Keene Cartoon Corporation, Lee-Bradford Corporation, Ted Eshbaugh Studios, Walt Disney Company), dies at age 72.

=== April ===
- April 3: Ned Sparks, Canadian actor (voice of Heckle and Jeckle from 1947 to 1951), dies at age 73.

=== May ===
- May 16: John Brown, British actor (voice of Umpire in Make Mine Music, Noah Webster in Symphony in Slang, the narrator, Pee Wee and the theatrical agent in Dixieland Droopy), dies at age 53.

=== June ===
- June 21: Kay Nielsen, Danish-American painter, illustrator and animator (Fantasia, Sleeping Beauty, The Little Mermaid), dies at age 71.

=== November ===
- November 4: Norm Ferguson, American animator (Walt Disney Company, designed Peg-Leg Pete, the Big Bad Wolf and Pluto, served as the primary animator of the witch in Snow White and the Seven Dwarfs), dies at age 55 from a heart attack.
- November 21: Bob Amsberry, American actor (voice of Joe Muffaw in Paul Bunyan, one of Maleficent's Goons in Sleeping Beauty), dies in a car accident at age 29.

== See also ==
- List of anime by release date (1946–1959)

== Sources ==
- Denison, Rayna; Alekseyeva, Julia (2017), "4", Introducing Studio Ghibli's Monster Princess: From Mononokehime to Princess Mononoke, London: Bloomsbury Academic, ISBN 978-1501329760
