= List of Ed, Edd n Eddy characters =

From top-left: Ed, Edd ("Double D"), Eddy, Sarah, Jimmy, Jonny 2x4 (holding Plank), Rolf, the Kanker Sisters (Marie, Lee, and May Kanker), Kevin, and Nazz

Ed, Edd n Eddy is a 130-episode animated television series featuring a cast of characters created by Danny Antonucci. Taking place in the fictional town of Peach Creek, its number of characters is fixed at 12 (13 if Plank, a board of wood who acts as one character's imaginary friend, is included).

The show revolves around best friends Ed, Edd, and Eddy, collectively referred to as "the Eds", who live in a cul-de-sac with neighbors Kevin, Rolf, Nazz, Jimmy, Sarah, and Jonny. Three antagonistic teenage girls, known collectively as "the Kanker Sisters", live in the nearby "Park 'n' Flush" trailer park. Eddy's brother, who is mentioned throughout the series, is seen exclusively in the movie Ed, Edd n Eddy's Big Picture Show. With the exception of Eddy's brother, all other characters are children or adolescents.

The series' characters have received awards and nominations at the 2002 Fancy Anvil Awards, a fictional award show broadcast on Cartoon Network. Antonucci stated the personalities of the Eds are based on personal traits of himself, and the activities of his two sons, and that the other characters are based on children he grew up with.

== Creation ==
According to creator Danny Antonucci, the characters are based on real people from his life; the personalities of Ed, Edd, and Eddy are based on his own traits, and the activities of his two sons while the cul-de-sac children and the Kanker sisters are based on children he grew up with. Rolf is based on himself and his cousins, since he grew up in a first-generation foreign immigrant household with different customs and ways of living, compared to those born in Canada. Jimmy is based on one of his cousins, who spent most of his time playing with girls than boys and was rather feminine. Jonny and Plank are inspired by one of Antonucci's childhood friends, a loner who spent most of his time outside with his blanket. He stated that he believed it was important to add Plank, a board of wood, to the show, and that he "thought it would be really cool to do the show with Plank taking on a character of his own" and to cause Jonny to do things he would usually never do. Some wanted Plank to be able to talk, smile and blink as if he was alive, but Antonucci insisted that it should be treated as a piece of wood, brought to life by Jonny's imagination.

Antonucci said that the idea of children having multicolored tongues came after he saw his son and his friends with different-colored tongues because of eating different candy while he was working on a storyboard. The characters went through a number of "walking cycles", a process used to determine how each character should walk or run, turn around, blink, etc. before the crew came up with the final product.

== Protagonists ==
=== Ed ===
Ed (Matt Hill) is the strong, airheaded, dimwitted, and considerate of the three who has very short hair. He wears a red-and-white striped shirt, a green jacket with two white stripes on each sleeve, and purple-blue jeans. His skin is yellow, unlike the other characters, and he is known to laugh a lot and is happy most of the time. Ed has amazing physical strength, which is humorously worked into many of the show's plots. He has no chin and a prominent unibrow (which has led to the nicknames of "Funnelhead" and "Monobrow" by Eddy). His mind is a subculture grab-bag full of comics and monster movies, which he often confuses with reality, and which leads him to speak in non sequiturs almost all the time. Ed (to the misfortune of many people) is utterly at the mercy of his tyrannical younger sister Sarah and is an easy target of her manipulations, with Sarah threatening to tell their mother if she does not get her way.

Ed is kindhearted, good-natured, and has a positive attitude towards almost everything and everyone, even to those who are not accommodating to him. He cares about the welfare of the other two Eds. He often sacrifices himself for his two best friends, the other cul-de-sac children, and even Sarah, for whom he cares deeply, though she treats him badly. He is absentminded and naive, making him the perfect candidate to help Eddy with his scams, as Ed hardly ever questions them. Even so, Ed never feels abused by Eddy.

Ed enjoys buttered toast, gravy, cereal (namely Chunky Puffs), pudding skin, chickens, comics and monster movies. Much to the dismay of mysophobic Edd, he has poor personal hygiene, even to the point of being terrified of soap and liking the smell of stink bombs and sweaty boots. Though the Eds were outcasts throughout the series, in the series' TV movie finale Ed, Edd n Eddy's Big Picture Show, the three become friends with all the cul-de-sac children; even Sarah starts treating Ed nicely.

Creator Danny Antonucci explained Ed's inspiration saying, "Ed is...me, following his own path and slightly dysfunctional, a daydreamer who while people are doing one thing, will be busy thinking of another." He also described Ed as "slow, living in his own world and he really doesn't fit in with the rest of the crowd," and explained that it was hard to decide who would voice him. Ed ended up being voiced by Matt Hill.

=== Edd ("Double D") ===
Edd (Samuel Vincent) is the smartest of the Eds and the most polite, mature, curious, and somewhat ironic. As a result, he is more socially accepted by the rest of the kids than Ed and Eddy, usually acting as a peacemaker or offering the rest of the kids advice. To differentiate his homophonic name from Ed, he is referred to as Double D. Edd has a high IQ and is top of the class in most subjects at school, though he is the physically weakest of the Eds and despises P.E. and other sporting activities. As the most creative of the trio, he is able to construct things like planes, rocket cars, and roller coasters with junk he comes across and enjoys doing so. He also is able to play pedal steel guitar, but does not like to do so often. He often speaks using complex words and struggles to speak normally in high anxiety situations. His clothing usually consists of a red/orange shirt, purple shorts, red socks, and cyan shoes. He sleeps in a footed onesie, and in the later seasons and the movie, he wears a tie when going to school. He more famously wears a black ski hat with two white lines on each side of it (which has led to Eddy nicknaming him "Sockhead"). It is unknown what lies under Edd's hat; Ed and Eddy see Edd twice without his hat on. Whatever his hat hides, Edd is self-conscious about it; Eddy frequently blackmails Edd by threatening to reveal the contents of his hat. Edd is also self-conscious about a significant gap in his front teeth, thanks to Eddy poking fun at it. He is the only one of the trio to be an only child, and his parents leave sticky notes around his house as a means of communicating with him.

Like the other two Eds, Edd's personality is largely based upon series creator Danny Antonucci, who has said "there's my Edd side, neurotic, analytical, must be organized. Also if Eddy and Ed (single D) were not around, Edd would be happy with his own company, something that works for me too." Antonucci has also explained that the habit of Edd's parents to communicate with him through sticky notes was based on a habit of his own parents.

=== Eddy ===
Eddy (Note: Eddy's last name is shown to be McGee in the episodes "My Fair Ed" and "Mission Ed-Possible", while his middle name Skipper was revealed in "Your Ed Here", which uses this revelation as the main plot point of that episode. Thus his full name would most likely be Edward Skipper McGee.) (Tony Sampson in the entire Ed, Edd n Eddy franchise; James Arnold Taylor in FusionFall) is the self-appointed leader of the Eds. He is arrogant, self-centered, ignorant, loudmouthed, immature, greedy, and hot-tempered. He has pink/purple skin, with three long black hairs growing from his head, and his wardrobe consists usually of a yellow and red bowling shirt, blue jeans, and red shoes. He loves money, jawbreakers (which he likes to spend his ill-earned money on), dirty magazines (as hinted in "Luck of the Ed"), his room, and Chunky Puffs. Eddy ordinarily comes up with the plans for scamming people, but they usually fail, much to his frustration. Eddy will often, especially in the early seasons, slack off by suntanning or drinking a soda while his fellow Eds do all the work. His prized possessions include his magazines, king-sized bed, and disco ball. He also has a Barry White album and is a fan of Tom Jones. Eddy is the shortest of the Eds and takes this very seriously, hating the thought of people calling him short, suggesting he may have a Napoleon complex. Eddy sometimes boasts about his older brother and uses this to his advantage to gain respect. Like Kevin, Eddy can be cruel and acerbic, with a tendency to tease his peers, but deep down, Eddy only wants to be liked by everyone.

== Supporting characters ==
=== Jonny ===
Jonny, also known as Jonny 2x4 (David Paul Grove), is a loner and considered by his peers to be a nuisance. Jonny is often made fun of for his big bald head (Eddy usually refers to him as "Melonhead" or as a "bald badger") and has a tendency of getting his head caught in branches when climbing trees. He talks a lot, and frequently gets on the other kids' nerves. He is rarely seen without his imaginary friend, a 2x4 wooden board with drawn-on eyes and a mouth, aptly named Plank. Jonny seems innocent and gullible, and often forgives people no matter what they do. He does not seem to mind the antics of the Eds, and is often the most friendly out of all the cul-de-sac kids towards them. He is very protective of Plank, and will burst into acts of bravery or extreme aggression if Plank is stolen or harmed in some way. He does not seem to acknowledge that Plank is just an inanimate, silent, 2x4 piece of wood, and when asked for help with an imaginary friend, he claimed to have no clue what the Eds are talking about. He and Plank both have superhero alter egos (Captain Melonhead and Splinter the Wonderwood, respectively), which they assumed twice throughout the series; first in "Robbin' Ed" to thwart Eddy's "Thingamajig" scam and to fight Eddy's own one-time only alter ego, Professor Scam, and then in Ed, Edd n Eddy's Big Picture Show to hunt down and get revenge on the Eds. After Big Picture Show, he and Plank become The Gourd and Timber the Dark Shard in order to take revenge on the entire cul-de-sac (although Plank reveals that there is no more time left in the movie at this point).

=== Jimmy ===
Jimmy (Keenan Christenson) is an insecure and innocent child, with a propensity to cry, and Sarah's best friend whom he is most often seen spending his time with. Jimmy is highly accident-prone, often seen sporting bandages, casts, and braces (particularly headgear), and is considered the weakest kid in the cul-de-sac. Though Jimmy has a gentle personality, he truly wishes to be strong and muscular, and many episodes demonstrate his desire for fame and stardom. He can be crafty when motivated, and had twice made scams that were very successful. Jimmy has shown how deeply attached he is to Sarah when someone tries to take her away from him. He wears a retainer around his face to protect and straighten his teeth, which became mangled when one of Eddy's scams resulted in him biting a bowling pin.

=== Sarah ===
Sarah (Janyse Jaud) is Ed's spoiled and short-tempered younger sister who acts cute and kind to the Eds only when it suits her. She is commonly depicted with a disgruntled facial expression and treats her intimidated, trembling older brother, frightened by his sister's constant threats of tattling on him, with complete disdain. Imposing, Sarah frequently orders people (sometimes even those of higher rightful authority than her) around, and her desires often have to be met or else she will fling herself into a violent temper tantrum or threaten the person in question. Throughout the course of the series, Sarah has been shown to possess an infatuation with Edd, but still occasionally subjects him to abuse due to guilt by association with the other Eds. In the series' TV movie finale Ed, Edd n Eddy's Big Picture Show, Sarah realizes the error of her ways upon seeing Eddy's brother beat up Eddy for no reason (basically herself if she continued down the same path) and makes amends with the Eds, even seen hugging Ed after helping defeat Eddy's brother.

=== Kevin ===
Kevin (Kathleen Barr) is a stereotypical jock. He is cynical, sarcastic and can be cruel at times. Kevin has a garage full of jawbreakers, due to the fact that his father works at a jawbreaker factory. He loves customizing his bike, skateboards, and snowboards. When not riding his trusty bike, he usually hangs out with Rolf and Nazz in the Lane. He hates the Eds to the point of paranoia, but his animosity towards them is mostly geared at Eddy; the two are mortal enemies and often go entirely out of their way to humiliate or physically harm each other at the first opportunity (with Eddy referring to Kevin as "Shovel Chin"). He tends to call the Eds "dorks" and has a habit of coming up with words merged with "dork" to suit the situation. Like Edd, Kevin normally wears a hat and rarely takes it off; in the episode "Boys Will be Eds", Kevin takes off his hat for the first time and is shown to be bald, though a flashback episode reveals that he used to have long hair. In some episodes, he is shown to have a great fear of Eddy's brother; Eddy knows this and frequently uses his brother as leverage against Kevin.

=== Rolf ===
Rolf (Peter Kelamis) is a quirky, odd, and usually happy immigrant and culture with odd customs (which he displays frequently, and it often involves a wide variety of meat) and has a thick accent to match. Rolf is the son of a shepherd, a fact in which he takes great pride. He works on his parents' small farm within their backyard, and leads a scouting group called the "Urban Rangers," which includes Jimmy, Jonny, and Plank. Rolf usually refers to himself in third person. His faithful farm animals are three pigs (one of which is named Wilfred), a goat named Victor, at least six chickens (two named Bridget and Gertrude), a cow named Beatrice, and five sheep. He generally appears to be friendly with the Eds (whom he calls the "Ed boys") unless they make a fool out of him or offend him in some way, in which case he is not afraid to use brute force. He seems to be very muscular, but this is usually only shown when he is angry. With his unusual customs and strange food, Rolf confuses the rest of the kids to no end, and his inability to comprehend the culture and customs of his new home is a running gag in the series.

=== Nazz ===
Nazz Van Bartonschmeer (Tabitha St. Germain in the pilot; Erin Fitzgerald in Season 1-2, 4-6, and movie; Jenn Forgie in Season 3) is a good-natured, sweet, mature yet somewhat ditzy, fashionable girl who normally treats her peers (including the Eds) respectfully. However, when antagonized, she will react violently to the cause of her agitation or partake in harming the Eds as discipline for an alleged misdeed that they have committed. A majority of the male characters featured in the series are smitten with her, and an entire episode once chronicled their many failed attempts at wooing her. She also possesses a number of humorous eccentricities, such as the ability to yodel, substandard skills at playing a rather large tuba and is often depicted with poor table etiquette. Edd seems to be the Ed that Nazz is closest to, as he was the first character she had kissed in the series in "The Day the Ed Stood Still", took him trick-or-treating in the Halloween special, and got him to dance with her at the school dance in "May I Have This Ed?". She appears to have a crush on Kevin, though he is mostly oblivious to this; he favors his bike more. Although one of the most mature of the neighborhood kids, she occasionally displays traits of the stereotypical "dumb blonde".

== Other characters ==
=== Kanker Sisters ===
Lee (Janyse Jaud), Marie (Kathleen Barr), and May (Erin Fitzgerald in Seasons 1-2, 4-6, and movie; Jenn Forgie in Season 3) are three half-sisters who serve as the main antagonists towards the cul-de-sac and its inhabitants. Lee is the leader with curly red hair that covers her eyes, Marie has blue hair, and May is the buck-toothed blonde. They live in the nearby trailer park called Park 'n' Flush. The mere presence of the Kankers is enough to terrify the cul-de-sac residents, and they have been shown to have volatile and destructive tempers. While all the Kankers supposedly like the Eds, it has been shown that May prefers Ed, Marie prefers Edd, and Lee prefers Eddy. Throughout the series, the Kankers repeatedly harass the Eds and force themselves onto them with romantic intention, much to their horror.

=== Eddy's Brother ===
Eddy's Brother (Terry Klassen) is mentioned frequently throughout the series, mostly by Eddy, though his name is never revealed. Eddy mentions how his brother taught him much about how to scam and to be a con artist. Throughout the series, many of the children are shown to have a great fear and respect for him. He was previously an unseen character, but he finally makes an appearance in the movie Ed, Edd n Eddy's Big Picture Show. Eddy's brother at first seems to be everything the other kids imagined, but it turns out that all of the folklore surrounding him was made up by Eddy to impress the other kids. In reality, he is a sadistic individual who refers to Eddy as a "pipsqueak" and bullies him mercilessly, which ultimately caused Eddy to become who he is. He works at the "Mondo a-Go Go" amusement park, but his specific job is unknown.

== Reception, appearances in other media and merchandising ==
In 2004, the Eds also appeared in a short series of basketball commercials with NBA All-Star Steve Francis. All three Eds have been the main roles in four Ed, Edd n Eddy-based video games, including Ed, Edd n Eddy: Jawbreakers! (2002), Ed, Edd n Eddy: Giant Jawbreakers (2004), Ed, Edd n Eddy: The Mis-Edventures (2005), and Ed, Edd n Eddy: Scam of the Century (2007), as well as appearing as playable characters in a number of Cartoon Network-based video games, including 2003's Cartoon Network: Block Party and Cartoon Network Speedway. All three Eds appear as non-playable characters in the MMOG Cartoon Network Universe: FusionFall. They also appear as Nanos (items that help the user or his/her party). The Eds and Sarah have also been free toys in children's meals for Subway. The three have also appeared on a number of Ed, Edd n Eddy T-shirts available for purchase on the Cartoon Network Shop. A series of Ed, Edd n Eddy DVDs have been released. The three have made a cameo appearance in a Foster's Home for Imaginary Friends episode, along with Dexter of Dexter's Laboratory, and in a crossover of The Grim Adventures of Billy & Mandy and Codename: Kids Next Door entitled "The Grim Adventures of the Kids Next Door." Ed appeared in the "Cartoon Network Elections 2004" with Grim from The Grim Adventures of Billy & Mandy as a team, and they ended up winning, due to the highest number of votes by viewers.

== See also ==
- List of Ed, Edd n Eddy episodes
