= Patric Caird =

Canadian composer

Patric Caird is a Canadian film and television composer.

== Biography ==
Patric Caird has been working as a composer for film and television since the early 1990s. In that time he has written more than 400 film and television scores which have been broadcast worldwide.

Patric Caird's musical career began as a jazz saxophone player - playing, touring and recording with many of the west coast's premiere jazz and blues artists, notably with the Juno Award (Canadian Grammy) winning band The Powder Blues, whose 1981 record Thirsty Ears was certified platinum in Canada while the band's greatest hits album First Decade (1990) became certified gold. With The Powder Blues Patric Caird toured Canada and the US for 14 years.

When at home in Vancouver, BC, Patric was busy as a session player, arranger and producer which ultimately led to his work as a composer for film and television in 1994. The diversity of his craft offered him the opportunity to compose for a variety of programming including animation, documentaries, comedy and drama. In the animation world, he worked extensively with Danny Antonucci both while at International Rocketship and later when Antonucci started his own studio - a.k.a. Cartoon. It was for the studio that he composed the score for the animated series The Brothers Grunt that aired on MTV. Later, he wrote all of the music for another a.k.a. Cartoon production, Cartoon Network’s Ed, Edd n Eddy. Additionally, he has composed music for popular TV series including The Outer Limits (Showtime/SyFy), Dead Zone (USA Network), Wildfire (ABC Family), These Arms of Mine (CBC) and Kink (Showcase), among several others. Patric Caird also has an extensive career in feature film composition. In 2000, his music for film garnered him a Genie Award (Canada's Oscar) for the Infinity Features film Here's to Life! with Kim Hunter, James Whitmore and Ossie Davis. His film credits also include the film Dead Heat with Kiefer Sutherland, Ann Marie Fleming's The French Guy (Park City Film Music Festival Gold Medal) and National Lampoon's Going the Distance among others. In 2014, Patric Caird composed the score for the Fox series Rake starring Greg Kinnear. Patric Caird continues to compose for film, television, theater and new media.

A citizen of Canada, the EU and the US, Patric Caird now lives in Los Angeles where he works from his Laurel Canyon studio.

== Awards ==
Patric won the Genie Award (Canadian Academy Award) for his music and has twice won the Socan International Television Series Music Award. He has also been nominated for the Gemini (Canadian Emmy) and has garnered numerous other awards and nominations, including The Park City Film Music Festival Gold Medal for Excellence, several Leo Awards and The Yorkton International Documentary Film Award. In 2015, Patric Caird was nominated for a Canadian Screen Award for Achievement in Music - Best Original Song for his collaboration with Sonya Jezebel Cote in the film Tru Love.
