= Rod Filbrandt =

Canadian cartoonist

Rod Filbrandt is a Vancouver-based cartoonist, illustrator, and writer. He was one of the writers of the animated television series The Brothers Grunt.

He produced a comic strip called "Dry Shave" that was published weekly in Vancouver's The Georgia Straight and in Toronto's Eye Weekly. He is the creator of two other strips, "Wombat" and "Tar Paper Town".

He has also produced illustrations that have appeared in such magazines as Vancouver Magazine, Entertainment Weekly, the Village Voice, and Men's Health.

As a production designer he has worked on such animated series as "Ed, Edd n Eddy," "The Mr. Hell Show," "Total Drama Action", and "Littlest Pet Shop."

Filbrandt has two books published by Anvil Press, "Dry Shave" and "Wombat."
