= Lupo the Butcher =

1987 short film by Danny Antonucci

- Theatrical release poster
- Directed by: Danny Antonucci
- Written by: Danny Antonucci
- Produced by: Marv Newland
- Production company: International Rocketship Limited
- Release date: November 23, 1987
- Running time: 3 minutes
- Country: Canada
- Languages: English; Italian

Lupo the Butcher is a 1987 Canadian adult animated short comedy film directed and written by Danny Antonucci. The short follows the story of a butcher who has a huge temper and swears at his meat when the smallest things go wrong. Produced by Marv Newland's International Rocketship Limited, Lupo the Butcher was a successful short and has earned itself a cult following.

== Plot ==
An Italian-Canadian butcher named Lupo is complaining about his job while cutting a giant pork rib in his shop. As each new slice falls to the ground, Lupo grows increasingly angry and swears at the meat. He then accidentally cuts off his own thumb; he panics and runs out of the store, and you can hear what sounds like Lupo getting hit by a car, which inexplicably causes his entire body to fall apart.

Blood gushes out onto the ground, and the various pieces of Lupo's body collapse into a pile. The screen darkens and closes in on Lupo's severed head, but, before the scene can disappear entirely, Lupo's head jumps forward, still alive. It remains on the screen, shouting insults during the credits, before falling asleep and fading out.

== Production ==
Danny Antonucci, who has worked in animation since the 1970s, decided to create his first solo work. Tired of people thinking that animation was only for children, he wanted to create a "character that people would believe in". Due to his Italian heritage, Antonucci wanted his character to be an Italian immigrant who would blame America for all of his problems. Originally intended to be a Barber, Antonucci eventually settled on Lupo being a Butcher. This character was inspired by his father and uncle. After the short was finalized, Antonucci was pleased with his creation, and felt that the three-and-a-half minute movie "worked out". It was produced by Marv Newland's International Rocketship Limited. Released in 1987, it was shown at Spike and Mike's Festival of Animation. Antonucci went on to found a.k.a Cartoon, Inc., with which he would create The Brothers Grunt and Ed, Edd n Eddy.

== Reception ==
Upon its release, Lupo the Butcher was a successful short and has earned itself a cult following. Eric Fogel, co-creator of Glenn Martin, DDS & the creator of Celebrity Deathmatch, stated that Lupo the Butcher inspired him to pursue a career in animation, saying: "That film opened my eyes to a world of animation that was strictly for grownups and inspired me to pursue a career path that was a bit more…twisted." In an interview with Take One, Linda Simensky described the short as "the South Park of its time" and stated that she remembers tapes containing the short being passed around her office in 1988. It was featured in Spike and Mike's book Outlaw Animation, written by Jerry Beck, and in the Spike and Mike DVD.

== Other media ==
Concept art of Meat the Family, the second short that remained unfinished.

Lupo and his family appeared in Spike and Mike's book Outlaw Animation, written by Jerry Beck. In November 2020, Antonucci's animation studio a.k.a. Cartoon announced on its Facebook page that it was developing a series based on the short for Netflix's streaming service. Lupo has also appeared in some MTV bumpers.
