= Cartoon Network Speedway =

2003 video game

- Developer: DC Studios
- Publisher: Majesco
- Designer: Ollie Sykes
- Composer: Steve Szczepkowski
- Platform: Game Boy Advance
- Release: NA: November 4, 2003
- Genre: Racing
- Modes: Single-player, Multiplayer

Cartoon Network Speedway is a kart racing video game released for the Game Boy Advance in 2003. Published by Majesco and developed by DC Studios, the game features characters from Cartoon Network's original animated television series; Ed, Edd n Eddy, Johnny Bravo, Courage the Cowardly Dog, Cow and Chicken, and Sheep in the Big City.

== Gameplay ==
The Eds navigate one of the first racing tracks.

Gameplay of Cartoon Network Speedway features 12 drivers, 12 tracks, password saving, and link cable support for two players with multiple game cartridges. The game does not feature a time trial mode.

=== Characters ===
- Courage
- Cow
- Chicken
- Ed, Edd & Eddy
- Johnny 2x4
- Johnny Bravo
- Muriel
- Little Suzy
- Red Guy
- Sheep
- Swanky
- Supercow

== Reception ==
The game received mixed reviews by critics and gamers alike. On IGN, it received a 3 out of 10, reviewer Craig Harris stating "Cartoon Network Speedway is one of the sloppiest and most generic kart racers released on the Game Boy Advance." It currently has a 53% rating on GameRankings. It was also given a 65 out of 100 from Next Level Gaming, a 3 out of 5 from Nintendo Power, and 58 out of 100 from VG-Force. Complaints centered on bad and choppy graphics, the slow pace, the fact that characters from Dexter's Laboratory and The Powerpuff Girls (both popular Cartoon Network franchises) were unavailable, and the lack of challenge.
