= Ed, Edd n Eddy's Big Picture Show =

2009 film directed by Danny Antonucci

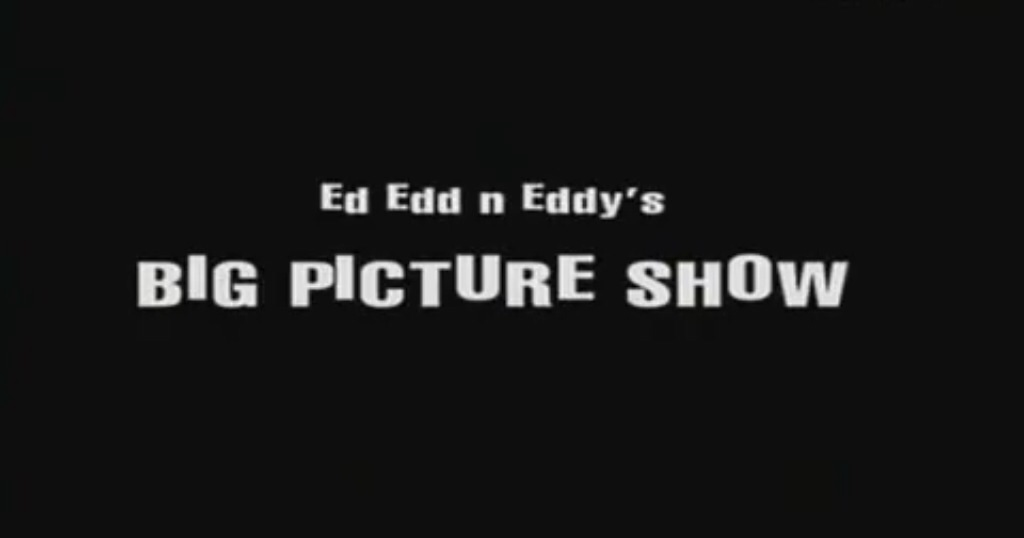
- Based on: Ed, Edd n Eddy by Danny Antonucci
- Written by: Jono Howard; Mike Kubat; Rachel Connor; Stacy Warnick; Danny Antonucci
- Directed by: Danny Antonucci
- Starring: Matt Hill; Sam Vincent; Tony Sampson; Keenan Christenson; David Paul Grove; Janyse Jaud; Kathleen Barr; Erin Fitzgerald; Peter Kelamis; Terry Klassen
- Music by: Patric Caird
- Countries of origin: Canada; United States
- Original language: English

Production
- Executive producer: Danny Antonucci
- Producers: Daniel Sioui; Ruth Vincent
- Editor: Ken Cathro
- Running time: 89 minutes
- Production company: a.k.a. Cartoon

Original release
- Network: Cartoon Network
- Release: November 8, 2009

Ed, Edd n Eddy's Big Picture Show is an animated road comedy television film that serves as the series finale for the animated series Ed, Edd n Eddy. It was produced by a.k.a. Cartoon and premiered on Cartoon Network on November 8, 2009. Series creator Danny Antonucci directed the film and co-wrote it with Jono Howard, Mike Kubat, Rachel Connor and Stacy Warnick. Big Picture Show centers on an adventure Eddy takes his friends Ed and Edd on to find his elder brother after their most recent money-making scheme leaves the cul-de-sac in a state of devastation that harms its other participants.

Antonucci and a.k.a. Cartoon spent two years working on the film before it was finished in 2008. To focus more on this, he shortened the show's sixth season to two episode segments after getting approval from Cartoon Network to work on a film. It stars Matt Hill, Sam Vincent and Tony Sampson as the title characters and Keenan Christenson, David Paul Grove, Janyse Jaud, Kathleen Barr, Erin Fitzgerald, and Peter Kelamis as their neighbors from the cul-de-sac. Terry Klassen, the series' voice director, voiced Eddy's brother, while series composer Patric Caird scored the film. Ed, Edd n Eddy's Big Picture Show had high ratings for Cartoon Network, posting double and triple digit ratings delivery gains. It has been praised as a strong conclusion for Ed, Edd n Eddy.

== Plot ==
"The Eds"—Ed, Edd and Eddy—anxiously flee their devastated cul-de-sac after their most recent money-making scheme backfires heavily and severely injures their neighbors Jonny, Kevin, Nazz and Rolf, who plot to retaliate violently. After narrowly escaping, Eddy recommends seeking protection from his older brother. Since Eddy does not actually know where he lives, Edd tries to piece together Eddy's inconsistent facts about him to determine a location. To find the Eds, Jonny takes his wooden board Plank with him on a city bus, Rolf rides on his pig Wilfred, and Nazz joins Kevin to travel via Kevin's prized bicycle. While Jimmy and Sarah, Ed's younger sister, were not involved or affected by the scheme, they decide to have a picnic while watching their retaliation. On the way over, they run into the Kanker Sisters; Lee, Marie and May. Upon learning about the other children's intent from them, the Kankers set out to save the Eds while taking the duo hostage.

Meanwhile, the Eds are left to wander aimlessly under Eddy's direction. In a cow pasture, Edd profiles Eddy's brother and reasons that given his con artistry, he would likely be found at a place involving pranks. Ed uses one of his decade-old comic books to suggest visiting the Lemon Brook Gag Factory. Upon arriving, they discover that it has been out of business ever since and Edd finds no clues in the office. Meanwhile, Wilfred, fed up with Rolf's abrasive attitude towards him, attacks his owner in a frenzy and abandons him.

After leaving the factory, Eddy claims his brother was once a whaler, so Edd deduces he must live by the sea. They build a boat and ride on it over a river to find him. The river ends in a swamp, where the boat is destroyed. Ed and Eddy then prank Edd into believing that they sank to their demises in quicksand. Enraged, Edd berates Eddy for the prank and his scamming before deciding to return home. As Ed laments over their damaged friendship, Eddy is initially enraged by this, but soon breaks down crying and accepts responsibility for their predicament, prompting Edd to forgive him as the Eds continue their adventure.

Elsewhere, Nazz loses her patience with Kevin prioritizing his bicycle over her well-being and feelings while Jimmy and Sarah escape from the Kankers and are accompanied by Wilfred. The Kankers abduct Kevin, Nazz and Rolf before the Eds come across a coastal amusement park the next morning called "Mondo A-Go Go", which matches a postcard Eddy received from his brother. They conclude that Eddy's brother works there and find his whale-based trailer as the Kankers catch up to them. Eddy's brother reveals himself and, although he originally seems willing to help Eddy, is eventually shown to be physically abusive towards him without reason, leaving everyone appalled. When Edd tries to interfere, Eddy's brother assaults him, prompting everyone to defend Eddy. Ed soon defeats Eddy's brother by pulling out a pin from one of his trailer door's hinges, causing it to fly into his face, knocking him out.

Now expressing remorse over his past actions, Eddy tearfully reveals that he lied about his brother in an unsuccessful attempt to gain admiration and social acceptance. Touched by Eddy's confession and eventual apology, the kids forgive the Eds and accept them as their friends. Jonny soon arrives and, without giving anyone a chance to explain what happened, quickly attacks the Eds. In response, the other kids turn against and attack him. Kevin then invites the others over for jawbreakers and they return home together while the Kankers stay behind to get back at Eddy's brother and give him "mouth to mouth". Edd concludes the film and the series by putting a label saying "The End" on the screen.

In a post-credits scene, Jonny is enraged over being turned on and vows revenge. However, Plank mentions that there is no remaining time in the film, much to Jonny's confusion.

== Cast ==
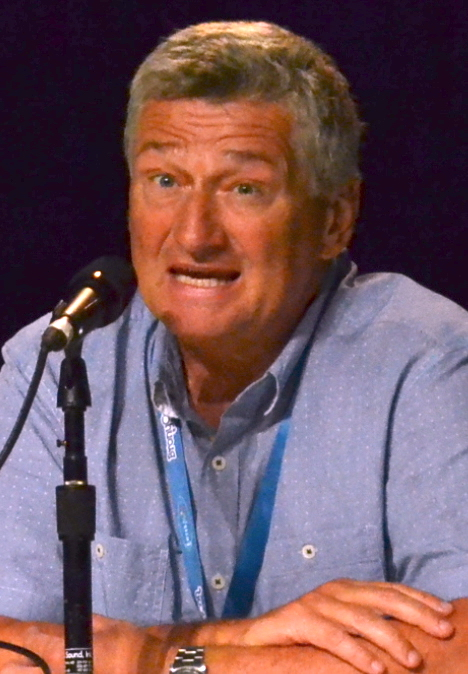
Terry Klassen (pictured in 2014) voiced Eddy's unnamed brother, who made his debut in Big Picture Show.

- Matt Hill as Ed, the strong, foolish and non sequitur-emitting member of the Eds and Sarah's elder brother.
- Sam Vincent as Edd, nicknamed "Double D", the intelligent, hat-wearing and neat-freak inventor of the Eds.
- Tony Sampson as Eddy, the greedy but self-conscious leader of the Eds.
- Keenan Christenson as Jimmy, an insecure and accident-prone boy who is a close companion of Sarah.
- David Paul Grove as Jonny, a happy-go-lucky loner who carries Plank, a wooden board with a smiley face drawn on it.
- Janyse Jaud as:
  - Sarah, Ed's spoiled and quick-tempered younger sister.
  - Lee Kanker, the redheaded leader of the Kanker Sisters.
- Kathleen Barr as:
  - Kevin, the short-tempered jock and bicycle-rider often at odds with the Eds.
  - Marie Kanker, the blue-haired Kanker Sister.
- Erin Fitzgerald as:
  - May Kanker, the blonde and dimwitted Kanker Sister.
  - Nazz, an easy-going blonde girl whom the Eds, Jonny and Kevin are attracted to.
- Peter Kelamis as Rolf, an immigrant from "the old country" with customs different from his neighbors.
- Terry Klassen as Eddy's unnamed elder brother who is an employee at the Mondo-A-Go Go amusement park and bullies his younger sibling.

== Development and release ==
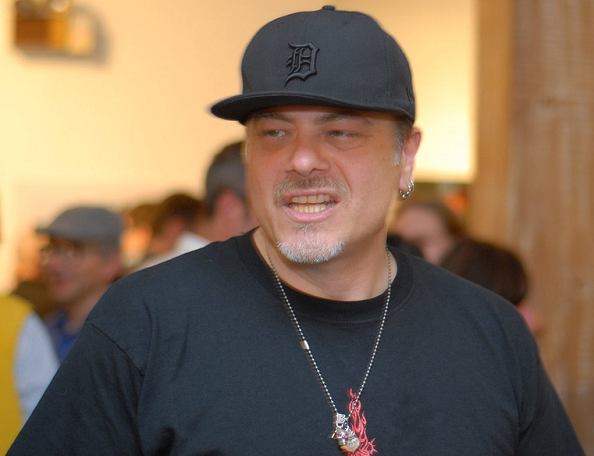
Danny Antonucci (pictured in 2007), who created the Ed, Edd n Eddy series, directed Big Picture Show.

While Ed, Edd n Eddy was in the middle of its fifth season, Cartoon Network confirmed on March 1, 2006 that a sixth one had been approved. As the show's creator Danny Antonucci and a.k.a. Cartoon were working on season six, the network allowed them to work on a film for it, which would serve as the series finale. He decided to cut the sixth season short so they could focus more on creating this movie, entitled Ed, Edd n Eddy's Big Picture Show. IGN stated that the series was on hiatus in November 2007. The two sixth-season episode segments that had already been produced—"May I Have This Ed" and "Look Before You Ed"—premiered on June 29, 2008. During The Complete Second Season DVD's "Behind the Eds" interview, Antonucci hinted that the film would reveal what is under Edd's hat, though this never occurred.

Before Big Picture Show premiered, Antonucci mentioned that it would show Eddy's brother for the first time. The character was voiced by Terry Klassen, who also served as the voice director for Big Picture Show. Antonucci directed the film and co-wrote it along with Jono Howard, Mike Kubat, Rachel Connor and Stacy Warnick. Daniel Sioil as well as Ruth Vincent served as producers while Ken Cathro was its editor and Scott Underwood, Steve Garcia, Raven Molisee, Joel Dickie and "Big" Jim Miller worked on the storyboards. Yeson Entertainment and Voicebox Productions Inc. respectively handled the animation and voice production. Series composer Patric Caird composed the score, and later released this on his website.

On December 1, 2008, Antonucci stated production on the movie was "wrapping up" after two years of work, and that it was airing on Cartoon Network the following year. When asked for details about Big Picture Show, he mentioned it being shown in widescreen format and that title characters would "do something really bad, and they find themselves running away from Cul-De-Sac to find a safe place". After being completed in 2008, the film premiered on November 8, 2009. It runs for a total of 89 minutes. Matt Kapko of Animation World Network described the premiere of Ed, Edd n Eddy's Big Picture Show as a "huge ratings success for Cartoon Network", noting that the premiere "earned double and triple-digit ratings and delivery gains among all kid demo[graphics]".

== Reception ==
Critics have praised Big Picture Show as a strong conclusion to the series. Charlie-Robinson Poortvliet of MovieAddictz.com gave the film an "8.2/10" rating, calling it a "double episode grand finale" that was superior to all previous Ed, Edd n Eddy episodes. Praising the film's plot, voice acting performances and direction, Poortvilet said that he "couldn't stop laughing" and encouraged all fans of the show to see it. Writing for Animated Times, Azhan Ali ranked it at number three on a list of "Most Emotional Endings of Cartoons", and added that the final scene was "heartwarming because the Eds are no longer social outcasts". Collider reviewer Austin Allison named the film as the fourth best among a list of "Top 11 TV Cartoon Movies", deeming it a "surprisingly cathartic" creation that "finally gives the Eds a sense of belonging and acceptance that is more valuable to them than all the jawbreakers in the world." In November 2019, Hayden Adams from UWIRE placed Big Picture Show atop a list of "best kids' TV show endings". Adams stated that it—along with the series finales for Codename: Kids Next Door as well as Phineas and Ferb—"really stuck with me, for the impact the shows had on me and the brilliant endings that were true-to-form in the culmination of each series." Writing for the same publication one year later, John Carter Jr. awarded the movie with a 10 out of 10 rating. He declared it a "perfect" end for the series because of the "finality" and the way Ed, Edd n Eddy's "longest-running gags, mysteries, and character relationships" were finished. Carter also called this "the perfect homage to a show about imperfect people" and stated it featured "deep and profound personal experiences that lead to significant growth". When noting how Big Picture Show and the series' three holiday specials were excluded from HBO Max in June 2021, Comic Book Resources contributor Noah Dominguez called the movie's absence "probably the most glaring omission" among the Ed, Edd n Eddy episodes featured for how it was the "true series finale, sending the Eds on an epic journey and completing their character arcs in order to end the show on a high note".
