= Tony Sampson =

Canadian musician and actor

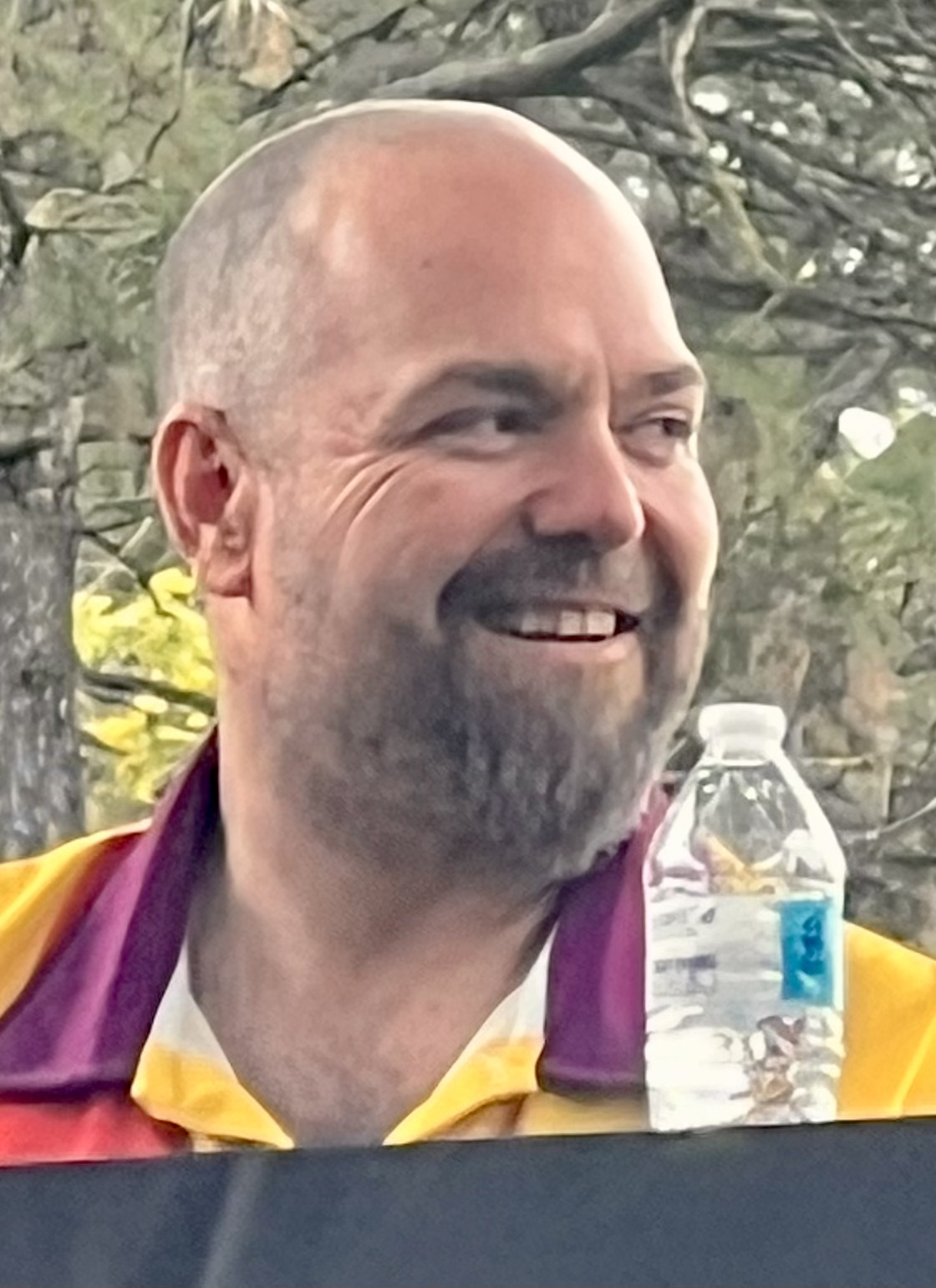
- Sampson in 2026
- Occupations: Actor; musician; oiler
- Years active: 1991–2009 (actor); 2013–present (musician)
- Musical career
- Genres: Pop; jazz

Tony Sampson is a Canadian musician, oiler, and former actor. He served as the voice of Eddy in the Cartoon Network animated series Ed, Edd n Eddy from 1999 to 2009.

== Biography ==
Tony Sampson has played the role of Flash in the Canadian television drama The Odyssey and Eddy from Ed, Edd, n Eddy. Sampson has also worked for Vancouver's Ocean Productions and Voicebox Productions, primarily in anime.

After Ed, Edd n Eddy ended in 2009, he retired from acting to work in the oil sands industry in Fort McMurray, operating heavy equipment. Sampson later revealed this was because the production company he was working under threatened to blacklist him from the acting industry after requesting a raise.

Since 2013, he has been a musical artist with songs on Spotify and iTunes. Sampson once made a guest appearance at the March Toronto Anime Con in 2006.

== Filmography ==
=== Animation ===
- Alien Racers as Kreff
- Captain Zed and the Zee Zone as Nasty Norman, Additional Voices
- Cardcaptors as Tori Avalon
- Cardcaptors: The Movie as Tori Avalon
- Dokkoida?! as Additional Voices
- Dragon Ball Z (Ocean Dub) as Pigero (ep. 10)
- Ed, Edd n Eddy as Eddy
- Ed, Edd n Eddy's Big Picture Show as Eddy
- Elemental Gelade as Rig (ep. 5), Additional Voices
- Exosquad as Pirate
- Fat Dog Mendoza as Additional Voices
- Fatal Fury: Legend of the Hungry Wolf as Young Andy Bogard
- Fatal Fury 2: The New Battle as Tony
- Galaxy Angel as Darling (ep. 10), Max (ep. 20)
- The Grim Adventures of the KND as Eddy
- Hikaru no Go as Aoki
- Human Crossing as Driver (ep. 5), Young Ichiro (ep. 6), Bully (ep. 11), Gang Member C (ep. 12)
- Infinite Ryvius as Marco, Ryu Gil
- Inuyasha as Seikai's Disciple (ep. 22)
- Master Keaton as Phil (ep. 34)
- Mega Man as Ramone
- MegaMan NT Warrior as Dex Oyama
- MegaMan NT Warrior Axess as Dex Oyama
- Mobile Suit Gundam SEED as Miguel Aiman, Recap Narrator (ep. 26)
- My Little Pony Tales as Teddy
- Please Save My Earth as Jinpachi Ogura/Gyokuran
- Project ARMS as Lt. Karl Higgins (eps. 21-23), Additional Voices
- Ranma ½ as Genji Heita (ep. 74)
- Starship Operators as Hide Chiba (eps. 3, 10 & 13)
- Tokyo Underground as Additional Voices
- Transformers: Armada as Fred
- What About Mimi? as Brock Wickersham
- X-Men: Evolution as Berzerker/Ray Crisp

=== Video games ===
- Ed, Edd n Eddy: The Mis-Edventures as Eddy
- Tonka Town as Chris the Crane, Tooey Timingbelt

=== Live-action ===
- Annie O (1995 TV Film) as Heckler #1
- Are You Afraid of the Dark? as Shawn Mackenzie ("The Tale of the Water Demons")
- Da Vinci's Inquest as David Crayling ("The Most Dangerous Time")
- Dead Like Me as College Boy ("Sunday Mornings")
- Dirty Little Secret (1998 TV Film) as Clerk
- Man of the House as Big Kid at School #1
- Millennium as Anthony ("The Mikado")
- Poltergeist: The Legacy as George ("The Substitute")
- The Angel of Pennsylvania Avenue as Newsboy
- The Commish as Derek ("The Sharp Pinch")
- The Odyssey as Keith/Flash Haldane
- The X-Files as Brad ("Red Museum"), Harley (Brother #1) ("Kill Switch")

== Discography ==
- Blasm! (studio album, 2018)
