= Jenn Forgie =

Canadian voice actress

- Born: Jennifer Forgie; Vancouver, British Columbia, Canada
- Occupation: Voice actress
- Years active: 1988–present

Jennifer Forgie is a Canadian voice actress, who is often credited as Jenn Forgie.

== Biography ==
Forgie is well known for her anime roles on Inuyasha, as Jakotsu, the homosexual member of The Band of Seven and Ranma ½ as Tsukasa. She also played May Kanker and Nazz von Bartonschmeer during the third season of the animated series Ed, Edd n Eddy. However, the creator, Danny Antonucci, preferred Nazz and May's previous voice, Erin Fitzgerald, and had her flown to Canada to replace her for future episodes. She has also appeared in a TV movie about Flight 93.

== Filmography ==
Year	Title	Role	Notes
1988	Mobile Suit Gundam: Char's Counterattack	Nanai Mingueru	English version, Voice
2001	MVP: Most Vertical Primate	Waitress	
2001–2002	Ed, Edd n Eddy	May Kanker / Nazz	Voice, 5 episodes
2003	Mobile Suit Gundam: Encounters in Space	Miyu Takizawa	English version, Voice
2004	Master Keaton	Clare	English version, voice
2009	Dynasty Warriors: Gundam 2	Nanai Miguel	English version, Voice
2011	Dynasty Warriors: Gundam 3	Nanai Miguel	English version, Voice
