= The Brothers Grunt =

Canadian-American animated television series (1994–1995)

- Genre: Animated sitcom Adult animation Black comedy Off-color humor Surreal humor
- Created by: Danny Antonucci
- Developed by: Dennis Heaton; Danny Antonucci
- Written by: Dennis Heaton; Danny Antonucci; Rod Filbrandt
- Directed by: Danny Antonucci
- Voices of: Doug Parker; Jennifer Wilson; Danny Antonucci; Julie Faye; Phil Hayes; Terry Klassen; Ed Hong Louie; David Mylrae; Drew Reichelt; Lee Tockar; Camella Rhodes; Kevin Hayes
- Opening theme: "The Brothers Grunt" by Brendan Whelan and Geoff Whelan
- Composer: Patric Caird
- Countries of origin: Canada; United States
- Original language: English
- No. of episodes: 42 (7 unaired)

Production
- Executive producers: Danny Antonucci; Abby Terkuhle
- Producer: Dennis Heaton
- Running time: 4–7 minutes
- Production company: a.k.a. Cartoon

Original release
- Network: MTV
- Release: August 15, 1994 – April 9, 1995

Related
- Ed, Edd n Eddy; Cartoon Sushi

The Brothers Grunt is an adult animated comedy television series, and the earliest series made by Ed, Edd n Eddy creator Danny Antonucci. It originally aired from August 15, 1994, to April 9, 1995, on MTV. It centers on five humanoids, named Frank, Tony, Bing, Dean and Sammy, who are in search of their lost brother Perry.

The series had a short run and was met with a generally negative reception, with many considering it one of the worst animated TV shows ever made.

== Overview ==
=== Premise ===
The series centered on a cast of pale, rubbery, twitchy, yellow-eyed, blue-haired, green-tongued and shirtless humanoids called "The Brothers Grunt" or simply "The Grunts", all of them ostensibly male with prominent bulging varicose veins, generally clumsy and dim-witted, able to bend, twist and contort their bodies into various forms and in their signature attire of boxer shorts and wingtip shoes. Their main food staple is cheese and martinis; nevertheless, they are able to eat other foods (at least potatoes, according to the episode "Not My Potato").

The Grunts' single parent is a large, floating, mute and morbidly obese male humanoid called Gruntus Primus Maximus, or simply "The Maximus", often leaking various noxious bodily fluids, to whom they are born as embryos inside skin warts, much in the way of the common Surinam toad. They live in a monastery in an unspecified location in the American wilderness, which the sewers lead to.

A group is formed, composed of five of a group of sextuplets born from the Maximus in a rare occurrence, in a quest to bring back their sixth brother, Perry, who has abandoned his involuntary position of "Chosen One" (leader of their order) and is now living the "high life" among human beings (who seem to deal with the bizarre nature of the Grunts by ignoring them and pretending everything is normal).

Due to the Grunts being practically silent characters, whose speech mostly consists of grunts with occasional subtitles (hence the name), most of the humor relies on physical comedy, particularly the Grunts enduring heaps of physical abuse. In music video segments that are intervened with some episodes, supervised by Kathy Karp, there are additional animated portions of the main characters grunting.

=== Lore ===
As shown in the episode "Grunt Moments in History", Grunts' earliest known ancestor was a pale, veiny hippo-like creature called the Gruntus Not Quite Us, which can be presumed to be a relative of the Gruntus Primus Maximus as it is shown birthing Grunts from its back. A prehistoric Grunt called the Neandergrunt had invented the cocktail glass using a cone-shaped bone. An influential Grunt named The 5th of Kevin was born centuries later. While the others fell off the Gruntus Primus Maximus at birth, Kevin remained and lived on the body of the Maximus his whole life. He built the monastery as a safehaven to protect his fellow Grunts, including the Maximus, from human persecution. The Brothers Grunt are therefore not only religious brothers, but biological brothers as well. Not much is known about the Grunt religion (itself seemingly a spoof on Catholicism due to the brown monk's habit worn by the brothers on occasion) other than that it involves the almost monomaniacal reverence, production and eating of cheese, as well as a variety of bizarre rituals overseen by the Gruntus Poobah. As shown in the episode "The Filling of the Shorts", the Grunts' trademark boxer shorts, invented by Brother Wayne, contain massive amounts of cheese stored in some sort of hammerspace pocket.

A sporting event is held on occasion called the Grunt Games, as shown in the episode of the same name, including such sports as necktie-folding, sumo, doing a clean and jerk using a giant cheese called the Great Dane before swallowing it whole, diving off the Maximus into a pool of melted cheese, throwing a giant olive into a sandwich, and a relay race involving assembling a martini.

=== Characters ===
The main characters were named after famous crooners of the 1950s: Frank Sinatra, Tony Bennett, Bing Crosby, Dean Martin, Sammy Davis, Jr., and Perry Como, all voiced by Doug Parker. They are sextuplets, all born from the same wart on the Maximus' skin, a rare occurrence among Grunts.

==== Main ====
- Frank – constantly bites his lips and cares the most about finding Perry.
- Tony – always faces upward due to his broken neck. In the episode "Cream Style Tony", he becomes popular for speaking his first English word, "corn".
- Bing – the largest of the brothers. Appears the least often and might have been killed off in the episode "To Hell with Bing".
- Dean – smiles constantly and is the most easily distracted of the brothers.
- Sammy – a Grunt who puckers his lips due to his lack of teeth and is in love with a lamp.
- Perry – a hunchbacked Grunt who became the chosen one in the pilot episode, but escaped due to the pressure of such a title.

==== Major ====
- The Detective – (Doug Parker) The series' main antagonist. A balding police detective who chases down the Grunts in a multi-episode story arc after Frank was arrested for swallowing a microphone. He believes the Grunts are insane (unaware that they are not human and have a distinct society) and is often accused of being insane himself. After visiting places the Grunts had been to before in previous episodes, he finds the monastery and is invited inside. It is unknown what happened after this, but it is known he came out alive and is still investigating the Grunts. He is rarely seen without his coffee mug and occasionally wears a chicken suit.
- Gruntus Poobah – (Doug Parker) The soft-spoken elder of the Brotherhood of Grunt who serves as the show's narrator and explains the plot before each episode. He also appears often in flashbacks and hallucinations when the grunts are in a situation, giving them advice. He is the only Grunt shown speaking perfect English. He was once a famous poet in the human world who read poems to a beatnik audience, as shown in the episode "Poobah Blues".
- Ringo – the Poobah's mute Middle Eastern assistant who has to carry him around on his back due to his grotesque obesity. He is the only human present in the Grunt Monastery other than formerly Vince. He also gives the Poobah massages and, as shown in the unaired episode "Black Balled Grunt", acts as his muscle.
- The Dıflash Queen's İgnam lamp – (Jennifer Wilson) A Turkish lamp who becomes Sammy's girlfriend and an honorary member of the Grunts' traveling party in search of Perry.
- The Gruntus Primus Maximus – (Doug Parker) Otherwise known simply as "The Maximus", he is a floating fat and mute giant and the male parent of the Grunts. All Grunts are born from sweat and warts on his back. The Poobah attends to him, feeding him cheese. Being the single parent of the Grunts, he is also the subject of a "Yo mama" joke in the episode "Black Balled Grunt", specifically "your Maximus wears tennis shoes".
- The Dıflash Queen – (Jennifer Wilson) A Turkish Queen that appeared in the episode "Scrub Me Sammy".
- The Fifth of Kevin – (Doug Parker) The founder of the Grunt civilization who appeared in the episode "Grunt Moments in History".
- The Smein – (Doug Parker) A Nazi German skunk that appears in the lost episode "Hunt for Grunts".
- Krischmäßante – (Doug Parker) The Smein's best friend skunk.
- Santa Claus (St. Nicholas or especially Kris Kringle) – (Doug Parker) A present-bringer that appears in the lost episode "The Grunts Who Came for Turkey".
- Vince – (Doug Parker) A human who was raised in the Grunt Monastery that appeared in the unaired episode "Hunt for Grunts". He showed repeated hostility towards the Grunts, even giving them tofu instead of cheese as a prank, and even attempted to lead the Grunts in a coup against the Poobah, until he was finally banished from the monastery.

The characters that would become The Brothers Grunt were first seen in one of MTV's numerous 30-second promos. This particular promo consisted of close-up shots of the then-unnamed character's faces who seemed to be straining to do something (veins in their heads would bulge, the characters would squint and grunt) until the scene cut to the MTV logo landing in a pool of sludge followed by a satisfied "Phew" (suggesting that the characters were suffering from constipation and the MTV logo was the 'turd' as it were). It is unclear when this promo aired if the storyline and characters for The Brothers Grunt had been developed already or if it had been developed into its own show after the success of the promo, in the wake of Beavis and Butt-Head.

== Episodes ==
Note: All episodes directed by Danny Antonucci

No.	Title	Written by	Storyboard by	Original release date
1	"The Ceremony"	Danny Antonucci and Dennis Heaton	Hilary Phillips	August 15, 1994
During an initiation ritual involving the sextuplet brothers and a duck, the duck flies off Perry's face revealing him as The Chosen One. He then abandons said title and flees the monastery, leading the Poobah to send the other brothers to find him.
2	"Make Mine a Grunt"	Danny Antonucci and Dennis Heaton	Mike Grimshaw	August 22, 1994
While looking for Perry, Frank swallows a microphone at a karaoke bar, leading to his arrest. This marks the Detective character's debut.
3	"The New Fish"	Danny Antonucci and Dennis Heaton	Russell Crispin	August 29, 1994
In jail, Frank meets an inmate who is obsessed with brushing and flossing the teeth of his fellow inmates and wardens alike. He manages to escape during a fight with guards.
4	"Where Angels Fear to Grunt"	Mike Grimshaw	Hilary Phillips	September 5, 1994
Frank meets a biker gang and hangs out with them, only to leave then when the biker gang is involved in an altercation with the Detective and a pizza boy. The Poobah appears at the end stating that this episode is how "Frank came to fulfill the prophecy of Darren, more or less".
5	"Viva Grunt Vegas"	Rod Filbrandt	Greg Sullivan	September 12, 1994
Dean travels around Las Vegas and meets a man who tells him to pull the arm on a slot machine only to get his own arm pulled off, which Dean attaches to an amputee Elvis impersonator. Later two gangsters take him to see a Tom Jones concert (represented by footage of Tom Jones' music video for his cover of Kiss.
6	"Scrub Me Sammy"	Danny Antonucci and Dennis Heaton	Russell Crispin	September 19, 1994
Sammy arrives on a boat and falls in love with an anthropomorphic female lamp, despite flashbacks of the Poobah telling the Grunts to deny love, before slapfighting a one-eyed French man to win her affections. This is followed by a montage of Sammy and the Lamp in various romantic situations, set to (Everything I Do) I Do It for You.
7	"The Detective"	Sam Johnson & Chris Marcil	Russell Crispin	September 26, 1994
The Detective interrogates Frank, who squeezes his body through a handcuff to escape mid-interrogation session. He meets Bing on the street, Tony at a diner and Dean at a cheese restaurant.
8	"If I Could Grunt to the Animals"	Rod Filbrandt	Hilary Phillips	October 3, 1994
Dean visits a miserably low-quality roadside attraction scam disguised as a "zoo", with a man in a monkey costume, a snake eating the monkey that was meant to be in that exhibit, and a puppet alligator. He is found by FBI agents and taken to an actual zoo, where he is featured in an exhibit labeled "Albino Wingtip".
9	"Grunt Moments in History"	Unknown	TBA	November 7, 1994
We see the history of Grunt civilization, from the earliest known Grunt (the Gruntus Not Quite Us) and the Neandergrunt (inventor of the cocktail glass) to the construction of the monastery by the 5th of Kevin, the first Grunt to live on the Maximus' body for most of his life.
10	"Perry Molo"	Unknown	TBA	November 14, 1994
In the jungle, Perry falls ill from a mosquito-borne disease and is rescued by a masked native tribe, who worship him as their deity "Mar-Ti-Ni".
11	"Tony and Salsa"	Unknown	TBA	November 21, 1994
After one too many drinks in Mexico, Tony mistakes a professional wrestler for his brother Perry, leading the wrestler to challenge him to a match.
12	"A Call to Grunts"	Unknown	TBA	November 28, 1994
Bing joins the army and learns how to throw grenades, clean rifles, crawl under barbed wire and storm a beach.
13	"Clean Up in Aisle Grunt"	Unknown	TBA	December 5, 1994
Frank and Dean hunt down Perry in a grocery store while the Detective hunts them down. Barcodes are placed on Frank and Dean's bottoms, and they are bought by two women. The Detective discovers a newspaper article showing Sammy and the Lamp at a Wisconsin motel.
14	"Land of the Midnight Grunt"	Unknown	TBA	December 12, 1994
In the freezing Arctic north, an Inuk hunter discovers Tony in the belly of a whale. Tony wanders off and goes to the hunter's wife's igloo, where she stretches him into a thin sheet and turns parts of his body into boots. Tony then regains his original shape (as per the superhumanly flexible nature of Grunts) and places the boots back on his body where they merge with him. After wandering around hopeless, disheveled and without food or fire, he sees the moon turn into the Poobah's head saying "remember Tony, you will never be alone!" Tony howls at the moon as if he were a wolf, which draws the attention of the other Grunts around the world who howl in turn (except for Perry who is being waited on by two showgirls). The episode ends with the Poobah exclaiming "yes my children, yes!"
15	"Close Encounters of the Grunt Kind"	Unknown	TBA	December 19, 1994
Frank is taken aboard a meat grinder-shaped spaceship where a massive alien butcher seasons and tenderizes him before selling him off at the alien butcher store. Together with other aliens who were captured for food, he attempts to escape but is chased by the butcher into a corner with a can of olives. Using his can opener he slices a hole into the ship's wall and is sent hurtling back to Earth, where he is wiped from Perry's car windshield. Guest Stars: Mike Judge as Beavis and Butt-Head.
16	"The Scent of Grunts"	Unknown	TBA	December 26, 1994
The Detective visits the Mexican cantina from "Tony and Salsa", a surgery room seen later in the episode "Paging Dr. Grunt", the tribespeople from "Perry Molo", the fake zoo from "If I Could Grunt To The Animals" and finally the park bench in "The Ceremony". He chases the Grunts through the sewers and discovers the Monastery.
17	"Paging Dr. Grunt"	Unknown	TBA	October 10, 1994
Tony emerges from a surgery patient's belly. Doctors attempt to cure his broken neck. After it is discovered his condition is incurable (all the cells in his body are Tony heads looking upwards as he usually does), Tony is made to become a surgeon himself.
18	"Perry's Appliance Repair"	Unknown	TBA	October 17, 1994
At his appliance repair shop, Perry attempts to fix an old phonograph, which is revealed to be haunted. Various small demons emerge from the phonograph who torture and play pranks on Perry using various appliance and tools before Perry pulls the plug. When the old woman who owns the phonograph plug it back in, the demons descend onto her.
19	"Timmy's Best Friend"	Unknown	TBA	October 24, 1994
A young boy named Timmy, tired of being used as living sports equipment by neighbourhood bullies, adopts Sammy as a pet and attempts to befriend him, but Sammy constantly tries to escape and track down Perry.
20	"No Quest Today"	Unknown	TBA	October 31, 1994
We get a glimpse into the Poobah's day to day life as he gets a back massage from Ringo, officiates a cheese-eating ceremony, feeds the Maximus and taste tests some cheese in the cheese-making room.
21	"Eat My Grunt"	Dennis Heaton	Mike Grimshaw	January 2, 1995
Sammy, the Lamp and Dean mess around and make mischief in a car while being chased by police officers sent by the Detective. The cars crash into a drive-in theater screen playing the music video to the song "Elephant's Graveyard" by the Boomtown Rats. The Grunts escape while the Detective watches on.
22	"They Stole Tony's Veins!"	Dennis Heaton	Rod Filbrandt	January 9, 1995
A shady man in a trenchcoat steals the veins off Tony's neck. In a panic, Tony witnesses hallucinations of veins. The veins are revealed to be alive and independent beings as they slither away from their restraints when the trenchcoat man kidnaps them and reattach themselves to Tony.
23	"Not My Potato"	Dennis Heaton	Russell Crispin	January 16, 1995
Perry and an Irish man fight over a single potato. Mid-fight, a horse steals the potato.
24	"Squeal Like a Grunt"	Jono Howard	Angus Bungay	January 23, 1995
Dean emerges from the fingernail of a man watching a televangelist show in a barber shop in a Southern town. The show features Perry as the televangelist attempts to heal him of "constipation" by slapping him. Dean is tied to the back of a truck and dragged down a dirt road by two hilbillies, causing damage along the way.
25	"The Big Crapple"	Mark Sawers	Russell Crispin	January 30, 1995
Frank, Tony, Bing, Dean and Sammy finally reunite in New York City. They cram themselves into a bizarrely contorted position in a phone booth where they call Perry, who is relaxing in the pool of his lavish mansion. His answering machine message plays, and the phone booth collapses before the Grunts, having melted into a puddle, slip into a sewer drain.
26	"Grunt Fare"	Mark Sawers, Dennis Heaton and Danny Antonucci	Rod Filbrandt	February 13, 1995
Frank and Tony incessantly laugh at a tomato inside a taxi. Thinking the Grunts are deliberately trying to annoy him, the taxi driver drives all across America as revenge in an attempt to drive the fee increasingly higher.
27	"Sammy in a Varicose Vein"	Rod Filbrandt	Hilary Phillips	February 6, 1995
Sammy emerges from the head of an old man at a nursing home and is mistaken for an elderly patient. He eyes a bingo ball machine and is called to host the game himself. He meets the family of Timmy from "Timmy's Best Friend", who mistakes him for his grandfather. Sammy attempts to escape but is caught and tortured using a rack, and returns with an unnaturally lanky figure.
28	"To Hell with Bing"	Unknown	TBA	February 20, 1995
Bing faces a series of trials and tribulations in Hell before being cooked in a stew and eaten by Satan. As this is Bing's final appearance in the series (unless confirmed otherwise), it is hinted but not outright confirmed that the events of this episode permanently killed off Bing.
29	"Cream Style Tony"	Unknown	TBA	February 27, 1995
After hearing multiple people around him say it, Tony learns his first English word "Corn". He attains worldwide fame from it (known as "Cornamania") leading to the establishment of a corn-themed dictatorship led by Tony. During a speech, Tony speaks in his grunt language about how he's looking for Perry, before saying the English word "Potato", leading to mass riots.
30	"The Ugly Gruntling"	Unknown	TBA	March 5, 1995
A hen's egg hatches into Sammy, who attempts to blend in with the other chickens. Sammy then enters a cow milking machine and is made into cheese, left to ferment making him extremely smelly, and entered into the county fair. The cheese judge is none other than Perry, who begins unknowingly eating his brother Sammy.
31	"5 Card Grunt"	Unknown	TBA	March 12, 1995
The two gangsters from "Viva Grunt Vegas" return and take Frank and Sammy to the boot of their car. After the Grunts hand them Dean Martin concert tickets, the gangsters challenge them to a game of five-card stud. The Grunts win triumphantly and the car starts flashing lights like a slot machine and awarding piles of cash, which blast them out of the car boot.
32	"The Stench of Grunts"	Unknown	TBA	March 19, 1995
Various people ask the Detective about his time spent at the Monastery. It is shown that the Detective was chased out a few times before being invited in, and is frightened by the sight of there being much more Grunts than he once thought. His story is cut off from this point.
33	"Grunt Games"	Unknown	TBA	March 26, 1995
The Grunt equivalent of the Olympics is shown: necktie folding, sumo, clean and jerk using cheese, cheese fondue diving, olive-throwing and martini relay race.
34	"Requiem for a Sammy"	Unknown	TBA	April 2, 1995
The one-eyed Frenchman from "Scrub Me Sammy" returns and challenges Sammy to a staring contest over the Lamp. Sammy remembers advice given to him by the Poobah when he was involved in a stare-fight with a fellow Grunt in the past, and inflates his eyeballs massively leading to the Frenchman's surrender. The doctors from "Paging Dr. Grunt" place a second eyepatch on the Frenchman's remaining eye, rendering him blind.
35	"Smells Like Dean Spirit"	Unknown	TBA	April 9, 1995
Dean uses his own sweat to help another Frenchman (not the one from "Scrub Me Sammy" and "Requiem for a Sammy") stay hydrated in a desert. Together, the Frenchman and Dean make a fortune by selling martinis made of Dean's sweat to various starving dehydrated people in the desert, leading to Dean being milked by machines in a successful factory. Perry makes a brief appearance at the beginning when he crashes into the desert.

=== Unreleased episodes ===
These episodes were unreleased, but have been uploaded to YouTube as of June 2019 by YouTube user Oecobius33.

No.	Title	Original release date
36	"Perry Come Home"	11 June 2019
Throughout his day-to-day life, Perry sees the Poobah everywhere telling him to return to the Monastery. It is revealed the visions are induced by the Poobah using hallucinogenic incense smoke and a radio signal of his own voice.
37	"Bring Me the Head of Perry the Grunt"	11 June 2019
Perry's likeness becomes a popular Halloween mask, leading Dean to chase down various children dressed as Perry believing them to be the real deal. After unmasking a child, he bursts into tears believing he has accidentally beheaded his brother.
38	"Black Balled Grunt"	11 June 2019
It is revealed that in the past, the Grunt Monastery adopted a human child, Vince, to join their brotherhood. Vince, in addition to being openly hostile towards his brothers, attempted to feed them tofu and even attempted to lead a rebellion against the Poobah. He was promptly kicked out of the Monastery. The episode ends with the Poobah stating "and that's the last I saw of Vince, I hear he's a network executive– who's to say he didn't get his revenge? GULP!" This is a fourth-wall-breaking reference to The Brothers Grunt's cancellation.
39	"Perry's Off Day"	11 June 2019
While working as a car mechanic, Perry overhears several conversations and decides to earn "big money" as a horse jockey, sitting on a bus, and as an art critic. While doing said activities he encounters and narrowly escapes the grasp of Sammy, Dean and Tony. The Detective makes a brief appearance tailing the bus Perry and Dean ride in. At the end Perry returns to his old job believing he will earn "big money as an auto mechanic" only to have his head explode in a mushroom cloud when he overhears a conversation implying that he will earn "big money" as a nuclear physicist.
40	"Tony & Lace"	11 June 2019
Tony must relearn how to tie his shoes as he attempts to track down Perry, who is now working as a forest ranger.
41	"The Filling of the Shorts"	11 June 2019
Dean returns to the monastery to have his shorts filled with massive amounts of cheese. We learn the story of Brother Wayne, who invented the Grunts' trademark shorts to be used in such a manner.
42	"Poobah Blues"	11 June 2019
The Poobah reminisces of his ventures in the human world as a traveling beatnik poet.

== Production ==
The show's origins can be traced back to 1993 when the MTV ad "Grunt MTV" aired. At the time Danny Antonucci had animated several MTV ads to find work outside of International Rocketship Ltd., who he had worked for since 1984. Although Danny enjoyed the success of Lupo the Butcher, he wanted to leave International Rocketship Ltd. and start his own animation company. The result was a.k.a. Cartoon, which began on April 1, 1994. The studio began as a way to locate his work for The Brothers Grunt after MTV executive Abby Terkhule liked his MTV ad so much, he asked him to turn it into a television series. In production order, each episode of the show would consist of three to four segments.

== Reception ==
"I still think it's a cool show and I really enjoyed doing it. For what I wanted to do I thought it was quite successful. That's the key for me. I really dig what I do and it's important for me to like what I do. I don't regret anything. I just look at it as something I did, and move on."

— Danny Antonucci, in response to the show's obscurity

The Brothers Grunt had a short run and was met with generally negative reception from critics. Kenneth R. Clark of the Chicago Tribune said that, with the series, MTV "created the most repulsive creatures ever to show up on a television screen" and "accomplished the seemingly impossible." Charles Solomon of the Los Angeles Times called the show "an effortful, sophomoric half-hour that leaves the viewer longing for the refined good taste of Alice Cooper." In their book North of Everything: English-Canadian Cinema Since 1980, William Beard and Jerry White called the series a "failure".

=== Comparison to Aaahh!!! Real Monsters ===
The show was often compared to Aaahh!!! Real Monsters, an animated series that aired on MTV's sister channel, Nickelodeon. Gábor Csupó, co-creator of Aaahh!!! Real Monsters, rejected these comparisons, claiming that his show was more character-driven, while The Brothers Grunt was an idea-driven series, also pointing out that both shows have different visual styles. When looking back on the series, creator Danny Antonucci stated that the series "didn't really do too well", also saying that the show has since become MTV's "dirty little secret".

== Other media ==
=== Merchandise ===
Fleer released in 1995 trading cards based on the series, as part of the MTV Animation Fleer's Ultra set. The show's theme song, written by Brendan Dolan and Geoff Whelan, was featured in Television's Greatest Hits: Volume 7, which was released in 1996 by TVT Records' soundtrack imprint, TVT SOUNDTRAX.

There were also a few t-shirts, boxer shorts, socks and calendars sold to promote the show between 1994 and 1995.

== See also ==
- List of television shows notable for negative reception
