= Carol Goldwasser =

American casting director (1957–2024)

Carol Goldwasser (August 3, 1957 – December 5, 2024) was an American casting director known for her work on Hannah Montana, Austin & Ally, American Dad!. She died from complications following surgery on December 5, 2024, at the age of 67.
