= Danny Antonucci =

Canadian cartoonist and voice actor (born 1957)

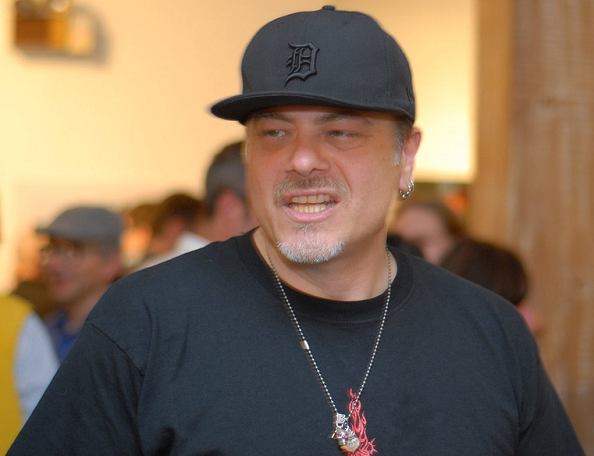
- Antonucci at the 2007 Platform Festival
- Born: February 27, 1957 (age 69); Toronto, Ontario, Canada
- Education: Sheridan College
- Occupations: Animator, director, producer, writer
- Years active: 1980–present
- Children: 2

Daniel Antonucci (/ˌæntəˈnuːtʃi/, Italian: [antoˈnuttʃi]; born February 27, 1957) is a Canadian animator, cartoonist, director, producer, writer, and voice actor. He created the Cartoon Network animated comedy series Ed, Edd n Eddy as well as Lupo the Butcher and The Brothers Grunt for MTV. He has also provided additional voice roles (such as voicing Mr. Sun in Ed, Edd n Eddy episode "The Eds are Coming, the Eds are Coming" and being a star in The Brothers Grunt).

Antonucci dropped out of the Sheridan College of Visual Arts to take a job as an animator at Hanna-Barbera, and worked on a number of series: The Flintstone Comedy Show, Scooby-Doo and Scrappy-Doo, The Smurfs, and Richie Rich. He continued his career in Vancouver, working on animated shorts and television commercials at International Rocketship Limited, where he created his first solo work, Lupo the Butcher. For MTV, Antonucci made a number of bumpers, his series The Brothers Grunt, and the title sequence to animation showcase program Cartoon Sushi.

== Early life ==
Antonucci's parents were Italian immigrants to Canada. His experiences as a child in an immigrant family deeply influenced his later work, such as Lupo the Butcher.

Growing up, he originally got into animation from watching Popeye the Sailor cartoons, along many other 1950's and 1960's cartoons like Tex Avery, Quick Draw McGraw, and Huckleberry Hound. Antonucci was a whistler as a boy, whistling "Big Noise from Winnetka" often, a personal favorite song of his. Antonucci also provided the whistle for the composed intro music for Ed, Edd, and Eddy.

Antonucci attended the Sheridan College of Visual Arts, which at the time, was the only college in Canada that had Animation for a major. He later dropped out to take a job as an animator at Canimage Production, a division of Hanna-Barbera.

== Career ==
Starting his career as an animator, Antonucci worked on numerous shows, including The Flintstone Comedy Show, Scooby-Doo and Scrappy-Doo, The Smurfs, and Richie Rich.

Intending to move to Los Angeles in 1984 to find more work, Antonucci landed in Vancouver, British Columbia. He landed a job at International Rocketship Limited, animating short films and television commercials. His first effort was on the short film Hooray for Sandbox Land.

=== International Rocketship Limited, foundation of a.k.a. Cartoon, and MTV work ===
Antonucci's first solo work was Lupo the Butcher, produced by International Rocketship Limited, about a short-tempered butcher who swears at the meat he is cutting and gets extremely mad at the smallest mistakes. Antonucci explains the short arose out of his own frustration at having to work in children's film for so long, and to try his hand at creating a full-fledged character on film. The short animated film screened at several film festivals, including Spike and Mike's Sick and Twisted Festival of Animation in the United States.

The 'Lupo' character was eventually licensed by the Converse athletic shoe company. This led to additional work, including animated commercials for Levi Strauss & Co. ESPN, Converse, and MTV. He also originally created a mascot for Cartoon Network, known as the jester, as well as the mascot's bumpers.

On April 1, 1994, Antonucci started an animation company named a.k.a. Cartoon, which produced the short-lived MTV series The Brothers Grunt, which began airing in 1994 and ended its run in 1995. Antonucci went on to work on MTV's Cartoon Sushi show in 1997, directing, writing and providing voices, in addition to being responsible for the title sequence of the show.

=== Ed, Edd n Eddy ===
Feeling confined to "gross" and "edgy" work, such as his series The Brothers Grunt, Antonucci decided to produce an animated children's television show again with his company a.k.a. Cartoon. However, he resolved to ensure that the series was produced in a way similar to the cartoon styles from the 1940s to the 1970s. Antonucci spent months designing the show, before trying to sell it to Nickelodeon. Nickelodeon told him that they would take the show, if they also obtained creative control. Antonucci refused to give it, and instead took the show to Cartoon Network. A deal was ultimately made for Cartoon Network to commission the show, after they agreed to let Antonucci go in his own direction. During a visit to the network's headquarters, Antonucci revealed he met with Ted Turner, Ray Liotta, Charles Durning and Burt Reynolds all in the same room where his pitch was very supportive by the four men.

Antonucci is a strong advocate of hand-drawn animation. The wobbling animation in Ed, Edd n Eddy is an homage to the hand-drawn cartoons with a style that harkens back to cartoons of the 1940s to the 1970s. To give the impression of movement, Ed, Edd n Eddy uses shimmering character outlines similar to Squigglevision. The crawling lines are not nearly as active as those in Dr. Katz, Professional Therapist, but are still visible, and Antonucci likens it to cartoons of the 1930s.

According to Antonucci, the characters were based on real people in his life. The personalities of Ed, Edd, and Eddy are based on personal traits of himself, and the activities of his two sons. The Eds also possess personality traits similar to The Three Stooges, whose money-making schemes and antics also invariably backfire. The cul-de-sac children and the Kanker Sisters were all based on children he grew up with. Antonucci also stated that he believed it was important to add Plank, a board of wood, to the show, stating that he "thought it would be really cool to do the show with Plank taking on a character of his own" and to cause Jonny to do things he would usually never do. He also stated that Rolf is strongly based on himself and his cousins, since he was part of an immigrant family, and grew up in a first-generation foreign household with different customs and ways of living.

Ed, Edd n Eddy is the only a.k.a. Cartoon show to have a movie based on the animated television series. The series' finale movie, Ed, Edd n Eddy's Big Picture Show, aired on November 8, 2009, officially ending the series.

=== WildBrain and upcoming series ===
While Antonucci was working on Ed, Edd n Eddy's Big Picture Show, it was announced on September 4, 2008 that he signed to WildBrain; Antonucci stated that he was "already kicking around three different ideas for his first WildBrain project". On June 11, 2013, US animator Joe Murray posted a short interview with Antonucci for his class on his website, and on the end wrote: "He's currently working on a new series, so rock on." In November 2020, Antonucci confirmed a series based on Lupo the Butcher was in development for release on Netflix which got canceled due to creative differences between Antonucci and Netflix.

== Awards and nominations ==
Antonucci's first solo work Lupo the Butcher was a successful short and is considered to be a cult classic. Eric Fogel, creator of Celebrity Deathmatch, stated that Lupo the Butcher "opened [his] eyes to a world of animation that was strictly for grownups and inspired [him] to pursue a career path that was a bit more... twisted". Throughout his career, Antonucci received a number of awards. He worked on a number of award-winning commercials for Converse, ESPN and Levi's. In 1998, for his work on Cartoon Sushi, Antonucci received a National Cartoonists Society Division Award for Television Animation. Ed, Edd n Eddy received various awards and nominations; for his work on the series, he won a Reuben Award for Best Television Animation in 1999 and a Leo Award for Best Director in an Animated Production or Series in 2000. With an almost 11-year run, it remains the longest running original Cartoon Network series and Canadian-made animated series to date. It was also Cartoon Network's most popular series among boys ages 2–11. Bob Higgins, head of WildBrain, considered Ed, Edd n Eddy to be a "landmark in animation". Joe Murray, known for creating the animated series Rocko's Modern Life and Camp Lazlo, called Antonucci "one of the founders and mainstays of modern animation".

== Personal life ==
Antonucci has two children, named Tex and Marlowe, who were named after animator Tex Avery and the fictional character Philip Marlowe respectively.

== Filmography ==
=== Films ===
Year	Title	Role
1981	Heavy Metal	Animator
1984	Hooray for Sandbox Land	Short film Lead animator
1984	Anijam	Short film Production artist
1987	The Chipmunk Adventure	Assistant animator
1987	Lupo the Butcher	Short film Director, animator, and composer
1989	Let's Chop Soo-E	Short film Corrections artist
1994	Deadly Deposits	Short film Animator

=== Television ===
Year	Title	Role
1980–1982	The Richie Rich/Scooby-Doo Show	Animator
1980–1982	The Flintstone Comedy Show	Animator
1981	The Smurfs	Animator
1985	The Velveteen Rabbit	Television film Animator
1985	Rumpelstiltskin	Television film Animator
1987	Tales of the Mouse Hockey League	Short television film Character designer and key animator
1994–1995	The Brothers Grunt	Creator, writer, executive producer, director, and voice actor
1997	Cartoon Sushi	Co-creator and director
1999–2009	Ed, Edd n Eddy	Creator, co-writer, director, executive producer, and voice of Mr. Sun from "The Eds are Coming, the Eds are Coming"
2009	Ed, Edd n Eddy's Big Picture Show	Television film Director, co-writer, executive producer
2017	Snotrocket	Pilot; Creator, director, writer and executive producer
