= A.k.a. Cartoon =

Canadian animation studio

a.k.a. Cartoon Inc.
- Industry: Animation production
- Founded: April 1, 1994; 32 years ago
- Founder: Danny Antonucci
- Headquarters: Vancouver, British Columbia, Canada
- Products: Ed, Edd n Eddy; The Brothers Grunt; Cartoon Sushi

A.K.A. Cartoon Inc. (spelled as a.k.a. CARTOON) is a Canadian animation studio located in Vancouver, British Columbia. It was founded on April 1, 1994, by Danny Antonucci. The company's motto is "Dedicated to producing animation for everyone, whether they want it or not!"

A.K.A. Cartoon created and produced The Brothers Grunt and Cartoon Sushi — both for MTV, as well as Cartoon Network's Ed, Edd n Eddy Since 2015, the studio had been working on several projects, including an animated pilot titled Snotrocket.

The studio's original logo is a man who is based on Danny Antonucci himself being impaled by a giant pencil.

== Filmography ==
=== Television series ===
Title	Premiere date	End date	Network	Co-production with
The Brothers Grunt	August 15, 1994	April 9, 1995	MTV	MTV Networks
Cartoon Sushi	October 17, 1997	June 23, 1998	MTV	DNA Productions; MTV Animation
Ed, Edd n Eddy	January 4, 1999	November 8, 2009	Cartoon Network	N/A

=== Television pilots ===
Title	Air date	Network
Snotrocket	2017	Internet

=== Television films and specials ===
Title	Air date	Network
Ed, Edd n Eddy's Jingle Jingle Jangle	December 3, 2004	Cartoon Network
Ed, Edd n Eddy's Hanky Panky Hullabaloo	February 11, 2005	Cartoon Network
Ed, Edd n Eddy's Boo Haw Haw	October 28, 2005	Cartoon Network
Ed, Edd n Eddy: The Eds are Coming	May 11, 2007	Cartoon Network
Ed, Edd n Eddy's Big Picture Show	November 8, 2009	Cartoon Network
