= Ed, Edd n Eddy =

Animated television series

- Genre: Comedy; Slapstick
- Created by: Danny Antonucci
- Directed by: Danny Antonucci; Scott Underwood ("Smile for the Ed")
- Voices of: Matt Hill; Samuel Vincent; Tony Sampson; David Paul Grove; Kathleen Barr; Peter Kelamis; Erin Fitzgerald; Janyse Jaud; Keenan Christensen; Jenn Forgie; Tabitha St. Germain
- Theme music composer: Patric Caird
- Countries of origin: Canada; United States
- Original language: English
- No. of seasons: 6
- No. of episodes: 69 (130 segments) (list of episodes)

Production
- Executive producer: Danny Antonucci
- Producers: Daniel Sioui; Ruth Vincent; Christine L. Danzo
- Editor: Ken Cathro
- Running time: 22 minutes
- Production company: a.k.a. Cartoon

Original release
- Network: Cartoon Network
- Release: January 4, 1999 – November 8, 2009

Ed, Edd n Eddy is an animated television series created by Danny Antonucci for Cartoon Network. The series revolves around three friends named Ed, Edd (nicknamed "Double D" to avoid confusion with Ed), and Eddy—collectively known as "the Eds"—who are voiced by Matt Hill, Sam Vincent and Tony Sampson respectively. They live in a suburban cul-de-sac in the fictional town of Peach Creek along with fellow neighbourhood children Kevin, Nazz, Sarah, Jimmy, Rolf, Jonny, and the Eds' female adversaries, the Kanker Sisters, Lee, Marie and May. Under the unofficial leadership of Eddy, the trio frequently invents schemes to make money from their peers to purchase their favourite confection, jawbreakers. Their plans usually fail, leaving them in various, often humiliating and painful, predicaments.

Antonucci, an adult cartoonist, was dared to create a children's cartoon. While designing a commercial, he conceived Ed, Edd n Eddy, designing it to resemble classic cartoons from the 1940s–1970s. When pitching the series to Nickelodeon, the network declined to give him creative control, a deal to which Antonucci did not agree. He then pitched the series to Cartoon Network. A deal was made with the network to commission the series under his control. Produced by Antonucci's studio a.k.a. Cartoon, it premiered on January 4, 1999. During the show's run, several specials and shorts were produced in addition to the regular television series. The series concluded with a television film, Ed, Edd n Eddy's Big Picture Show, on November 8, 2009.

Ed, Edd n Eddy became one of Cartoon Network's most successful original series. It won a Reuben Award, two Leo Awards and a SOCAN Award, and was also nominated for another four Leo Awards, an Annie Award and two Kids' Choice Awards. The show attracted an audience of 31 million households, was broadcast in 120 countries, and proved to be popular among children, teenagers, and adults. The series has also included spin-off media such as video games, DVD releases, and a series of books and comic books featuring characters from the series. With over a 10-year run, Ed, Edd n Eddy became the longest running singular series to premiere on Cartoon Network, a status held until 2024 when it was surpassed by Teen Titans Go! It is still the longest-running singular Cartoon Network original series. The series also was broadcast on Teletoon in Canada.

== Premise ==
The titular characters from the left: Edd ("Double D"), Eddy, and Ed

Ed, Edd n Eddy follows the lives of "the Eds", three scheming boys who all share variations of nicknames of the name Edward, but differ greatly in their personalities: Ed (Matt Hill) is the strong and dim-witted yet kind-hearted dogsbody of the group; Edd (Samuel Vincent), called Double D, is an inventor, neat freak, and the most intelligent of the Eds; and Eddy (Tony Sampson) is a devious, quick-tempered, arrogant con artist, and self-appointed leader of the Eds. The three devise plans to bilk money from the other kids in their cul-de-sac, which they want to use to buy jawbreakers. However, problems always ensue, and the Eds' schemes usually end in failure and humiliation.

The cul-de-sac kids do not include the Eds as part of their group, making the trio outcasts. The group of kids are Jonny (David Paul "Buck" Grove), a loner whom his peers consider to be a nuisance, and spends most of his time with his imaginary friend, a wooden board named Plank; Jimmy (Keenan Christensen), a weak, insecure, and accident-prone child, who is most often seen spending his time with Sarah (Janyse Jaud), Ed's spoiled and ill-tempered younger sister; Rolf (Peter Kelamis), an immigrant whose customs often differ from the other children's; Kevin (Kathleen Barr), a cynical and sardonic jock who detests the Eds, particularly Eddy; and Nazz (Tabitha St. Germain; Jenn Forgie; Erin Fitzgerald), a calm and friendly blonde girl who the Eds, Jonny, and Kevin are infatuated with. All of the cul-de-sac kids share a common fear of the Kanker Sisters, Lee (Janyse Jaud), May (Erin Fitzgerald; Jenn Forgie), and Marie (Kathleen Barr), three bully girls led by Lee who live in a nearby trailer park and romantically harass the Eds. Each Kanker has a preference for who they wish to date and marry among the three, with Lee wanting Eddy, Marie wanting Edd, and May wanting Ed.

Aside from the Eds, the other cul-de-sac kids, and the Kanker Sisters, no other characters appeared in the series until Santa Claus had a cameo in "Ed, Edd n Eddy's Jingle Jingle Jangle", flying over Peach Creek to quickly drop off presents. During the fifth season, silhouettes of other people were occasionally shown, and in "Mission Ed-Possible", the arms of Eddy's father and Ed's mother were seen. An arm of Eddy's mother was also shown during "Smile for the Ed". In the series finale, Ed, Edd n Eddy's Big Picture Show, Eddy's adult brother (Terry Klassen) was seen for the first time, making him the only non-main character, and the only adult character to ever fully appear on the show. The series took place mostly within the fictional town of Peach Creek, and new locations were rarely introduced. Its first four seasons are set during a seemingly endless summer vacation, though from the fifth season onwards, the characters are shown attending junior high school in the fall and winter months.

== Production ==
=== Development ===
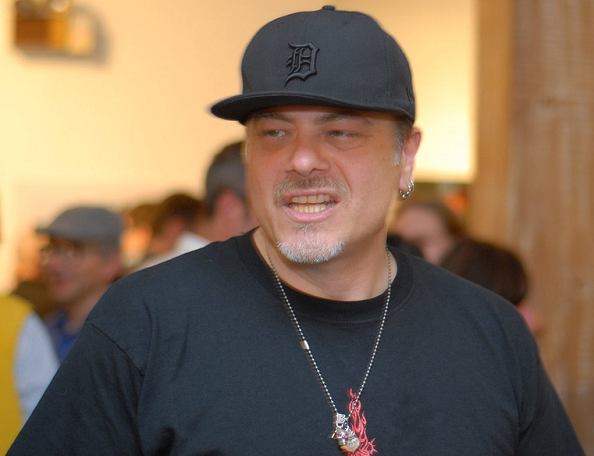
Danny Antonucci, creator, co-writer, director, and executive producer of Ed, Edd n Eddy, produced the series on a dare

Although cartoonist Danny Antonucci began his career by working as an animator on various children's series for Hanna-Barbera, his later solo works were edgy and aimed at adult audiences. He was an animator on the 1981 film Heavy Metal, and gained notoriety with the 1987 short film Lupo the Butcher and then, after founding his own production studio, a.k.a. Cartoon in 1994, created the series The Brothers Grunt for MTV. It was quickly cancelled, however, upon being met with generally poor reviews.

On a dare, Antonucci then decided that he would try producing a children's animated series of his own. While designing a commercial, he ended up drawing three characters that he felt particularly pleased with. Growing excited over their potential, he named them Ed, Edd, and Eddy and spent the following months developing a show around them. In 1996, he faxed a one-page concept sheet and pitched the series to Nickelodeon, but the network declined to give him creative control, and Antonucci refused. He then pitched the series to Cartoon Network. The network agreed to let Antonucci have control of the show, and conversations between him and the studio continued.

Vice president of programming and production of Cartoon Network, Mike Lazzo, showed high interest in the series and requested a show bible, which came through by fax, a few pages at a time, over a period of the next few months. After an affirmative response from Cartoon Network president Betty Cohen, the legal paperwork and deal-making began, followed by a start-up meeting at the Chateau Marmont hotel in Los Angeles. A deal was made that Antonucci's studio, a.k.a. Cartoon, would produce Ed, Edd n Eddy, making it the first Cartoon Network original series to be produced by an outside production company rather than Cartoon Network's Hanna-Barbera. The series also entered production and bypassed a seven-minute short; this marked the first time that one of the studio's original series had ever done this.

According to Antonucci, he based the characters on real people in his life. The personalities of Ed, Double D, and Eddy are based on his own traits as well as the activities of his two sons, while the cul-de-sac children and the Kanker sisters were all based on children he grew up with. Rolf is based on Antonucci and his cousins, since he was part of an Italian immigrant family, and grew up in a first-generation foreign household with different customs and ways of living, compared to those born in Canada.

Rolf is me and all of my cousins. My parents were right off the boat so I grew up playing to two worlds, the modern world, and the 1950s Italian world. My parents like Rolf's lived — still live in the past, with strong traditions and strange cooking and having a hard time assimilating to modern life.

Jimmy is based on one of his cousins, who was rather feminine and spent most of his time playing with girls rather than with boys. Jonny and Plank are inspired by one of Antonucci's childhood friends, a loner who spent most of his time outside with his blanket. He stated that he believed it was important to add Plank, a board of wood, to the show, and that he, "thought it would be really cool to do the show with Plank taking on a character of his own" and to cause Jonny to do things he would usually never do. Some wanted Plank to be able to talk, smile and blink as if he was alive, but Antonucci insisted that it should be treated as a piece of wood, brought to life by Jonny's imagination.

=== Casting ===
Matt Hill, Samuel Vincent, and Tony Sampson were respectively cast as Ed, Edd, and Eddy. David Paul "Buck" Grove and Keenan Christensen played the parts of Jonny 2×4 and Jimmy, respectively, while Sarah was voiced by Janyse Jaud. Peter Kelamis voiced Rolf, while Kathleen Barr was cast as Kevin. Nazz was voiced by Tabitha St. Germain in season 1, Jenn Forgie in season 3, and Erin Fitzgerald in seasons 2 and 4–6. Fitzgerald also played the part of May, one of the Kanker Sisters, except in season 3 when she was voiced by Jenn Forgie. The other two Kanker sisters, Marie and Lee, were voiced by Kathleen Barr and Janyse Jaud. Eddy's adult brother is mentioned frequently throughout the series but does not appear until Ed, Edd n Eddy's Big Picture Show, where he is voiced by series voice director Terry Klassen.

=== Animation ===
Antonucci, an advocate of hand-drawn animation, wanted to ensure Ed, Edd n Eddy was produced in a way similar to cartoons from the 1940s to 1970s. As a result, the series was the last major animated series to use traditional cel animation, only switching to digital ink and paint in 2004. Cels were shipped to South Korea at Yeson Animation Studios for creating the initial animation, and then later edited back at Antonucci's a.k.a. Cartoon studio.

To give the impression of movement, Ed, Edd n Eddy uses "boiling lines" or shimmering outlines which Antonucci likens to cartoons of the 1930s. IGN has compared it to Squigglevision, and Animation World Magazine wrote that the way the line varies and shakes gives the animation a distinctive and spontaneous feeling as if it were drawn by children. The boiling line is created by tracing off a drawing three times through sheets of paper. Antonucci explained that he felt it "helps keep the characters alive" and that he wanted to depart from other Cartoon Network series and pay homage to the classic cartoon era.

All the children have multicoloured tongues; Antonucci said that the idea came after he saw his son and his friends with different-coloured tongues because of eating different candy while he was working on a storyboard. The characters went through several "walking cycles," a process used to determine how each character should walk or run, turn around, blink, etc. before the crew came up with the final product.

=== Music and title sequence ===
Antonucci showed the theme song to the studios when first pitching the series, thinking it would be better than only looking at drawings. It was inspired by the Bob Crosby and The Bob Cats song "Big Noise from Winnetka," which was whistled, something Antonucci enjoyed doing as a child. Composed by Patric Caird, who created all the music in the series, Antonucci performed the whistling himself. Paul Boyd created the show's title sequence. The music of Ed, Edd, n Eddy is heavily influenced by 1930s and 1940s jazz and jump blues, rockabilly, boogie woogie, and the rock and roll of the 1950s.

=== Broadcast ===
Although Ed, Edd n Eddy was originally set to premiere on November 16, 1998, at 8:00 PM, the pilot, "The Ed-touchables / Nagged to Ed," aired on January 4, 1999, as the sixth Cartoon Cartoon, due to minor post-production delays. It was the first Cartoon Cartoon to not have been produced by Hanna-Barbera/Cartoon Network Studios. During the series' original run, episodes often aired as a part of Cartoon Network's weekly programming block "Cartoon Cartoon Fridays."

Cartoon Network ran several marathons for either commercial promotions or special airings of one of their shows. The eight-hour "Boy Girl, Boy Girl" marathon ran on March 7, 1999, airing episodes of Ed, Edd n Eddy and The Powerpuff Girls, which had been Cartoon Network's two newest series at the time. Later that year, Ed, Edd n Eddy was featured with other original Cartoon Network series in the third annual "Cartoon Cartoon Weekend," a fifty-three-hour marathon, which ran from August 20 to August 22. In 2002, the show was included in the similar "Cartoon Cartoon Marathon Weekend," which ran from August 23 to August 25. The six-hour "Ed's Day Off Marathon" aired 22 episodes on January 19, 2004, in celebration of Martin Luther King Jr. Day.

"The Best Day Edder," in which every episode was shown in chronological order, ran from April 27 to April 28, 2007, and ended with the previously unaired season five finale, which was promoted as the "final episode ever." However, it was quickly followed by "The Eds are Coming" the following month, as part of a special alien-themed event called "Cartoon Network Invaded." As of May 2, 2007, "The Best Day Edder" provided Cartoon Network their best ratings of the year. A seven-hour Sunday marathon, which ran before the premiere of Ed, Edd n Eddy's Big Picture Show, posted double-digit delivery gains among children ages 9–14 (up 14%), boys ages 9–14 (up 16%) and girls ages 6–11 (up 17%), compared to the same time frame last year, highlighting the network's weekend performance.

At the July 2007 San Diego Comic-Con, a cut segment from the season four finale "Take This Ed and Shove It" was screened at the Ed, Edd n Eddy panel. The series' fourth season was originally ordered as the last, but two additional seasons and four specials, including a movie, were ordered as a result of the series' popularity. The series finale is a movie titled Ed, Edd n Eddy's Big Picture Show, which aired on November 8, 2009.

== Episodes ==
Season	Episodes	Segments	Originally released	
Season	Episodes	Segments	First released	Last released
1	13	26	January 4, 1999	June 11, 1999
2	13	26	November 26, 1999	December 22, 2000
3	13	26	April 6, 2001	November 1, 2002
4	13	24	July 5, 2002	November 5, 2004
Specials	3	N/A	December 3, 2004	October 28, 2005
5	13	23	October 1, 2005	May 11, 2007
6	1	2	February 14, 2008	
Television film			November 8, 2009	

=== Specials ===
Along with an additional fifth and sixth season, Cartoon Network ordered three holiday specials that originally aired in 2004 and 2005. "Ed, Edd n Eddy's Jingle Jingle Jangle," the first, is a Christmas special aired on December 3, 2004. Valentine's Day's "Ed, Edd n Eddy's Hanky Panky Hullabaloo" originally aired on February 11, 2005. The final, Halloween special, "Ed, Edd n Eddy's Boo Haw Haw" aired on October 28, 2005. Antonucci stated that "Boo Haw Haw" was one of his favourite Ed, Edd n Eddy episodes that he worked on. On May 11, 2007, a fourth special, "The Eds are Coming" aired; however, it was not a holiday special, but an adjunct to other Cartoon Network series Foster's Home for Imaginary Friends, My Gym Partner's a Monkey, Camp Lazlo, and The Grim Adventures of Billy & Mandy in the alien-themed mini-series Cartoon Network Invaded that aired all five specials from May 4 to May 28, 2007.

== Appearances in other series or works ==
Besides their own series, Ed, Double D, and Eddy have also appeared in other cartoon series. They appeared in the Foster's Home for Imaginary Friends episode "Eddie Monster" and were drawn using that series' style of animation, and made a short cameo in "The Grim Adventures of the KND", a crossover of The Grim Adventures of Billy & Mandy and Codename: Kids Next Door. They also appeared on a small crossover poster during its credits entitled Ed, Edd n Mandy. In 2012, Double D made an appearance in the animated sketch comedy Cartoon Network series Mad episode "Once Upon a Toon." In 2018, Plank appeared in the Robot Chicken episode "3 2 1 2 333, 222, 3...66?" in a segment entitled "Plank: The College Years".

The show was featured in the 2002 edition of Cartoon Network's fictional awards program, The 1st 13th Annual Fancy Anvil Awards Show Program Special: Live in Stereo. It won Best Performance by an Inanimate Object in a Dramatic Role for the character of Plank, and Best Performance by a Team in a Cartoon Series for the characters of Ed, Double D, and Eddy. The character of Sarah was nominated for Best Performance by a Female in a Cartoon Series, but lost to Bubbles from The Powerpuff Girls.

In 2004, the Eds appeared in a short series of basketball commercials with NBA All-Star Steve Francis. Ed appeared in the "Cartoon Network Elections 2004" with Grim from The Grim Adventures of Billy & Mandy as a team, and they ended up winning, due to the highest number of votes by viewers.

The fourth single on American rapper JID's debut album, The Never Story, is titled "EdEddnEddy." In the song, the rapper declares the antics of him and two of his friends are similar to the scams of Ed, Edd, and Eddy. A music video for the song was later released, replicating the series' signature art style. The video was also planned to debut on Adult Swim, but according to JID legal issues prevented this from panning out.

In January 2026, the video game Fortnite introduced Ed as a playable character.

== Reception and achievements ==
=== Ratings and run length achievements ===
Ed, Edd n Eddy attracted an audience of 31 million households, was broadcast in 120 countries, and was popular among both children and adults. According to Cartoon Network executive Linda Simensky, the first season did "remarkably well" in ratings following its premiere, becoming one of the top-rated series on the network. It was Cartoon Network's most popular show among boys ages 2–11. In 2005, it was reported that Ed, Edd n Eddy was the number one rated show on Cartoon Network and was known to 79% of children aged 6–11. The series ran for nearly 11 years, making it the longest-running Cartoon Network original series at the time, and at the time of its finale, the longest-running Canadian-produced animated series.

=== Critical reception ===
Ed, Edd n Eddy received widespread critical acclaim and became one of Cartoon Network's most successful original series. David Cornelius of DVD Talk considered the Eds to be child equivalents of The Three Stooges, believing that "the series revels in the sort of frantic, often gross humour kids love so much, and there's just enough oddball insanity at play to make adults giggle just as easily." Cornelius also wrote that the "animation is colourful and intentionally bizarre; bold lines forming the characters and backgrounds wiggle and morph in a delirious haze. This is the animation that's, well, really animated."

Despite this, not all reception of the show was positive. Terrence Briggs of Animation World Magazine considered every second of the show "filler" and lamented that the main characters are drawn as "products from the school of acid-trip caricature." After Briggs' review was published, a large number of letters supportive of the show were sent to the magazine, prompting it to "take a second look" at the show. Different reviewers then gave it a positive review, calling it a "fresh show with very different approaches."

=== Accolades ===
During its run, Ed, Edd n Eddy was nominated for a Reuben Award, six Leo Awards, an Annie Award, two Kids' Choice Awards and a SOCAN Award, winning the Reuben Award, two Leo Awards and the SOCAN Award. Desi Jedeikin of Smosh.com listed Ed, Edd n Eddy on the website's list of "9 Cartoons That Need a Reboot." Complex included Eddy's room on their list of "Movie and TV Characters' Bedrooms You Wished Were Yours," and ranked Jimmy 14th on their list of "15 Artistic Characters We Miss From Our Childhood." Cracked.com praised the show's high level of violence, stating that it "set the bar on cartoon violence for anything that was played on Cartoon Network, and thus far, none have surpassed them." Bob Higgins, head of creative at Wild Brain, considered Ed, Edd n Eddy to be a "landmark in animation."

In August 2002, the New York Museum of Television and Radio featured the episode "An Ed Is Born" as part of the special program "Cartoon Power! Celebrating Cartoon Network's 10th Birthday".

Awards and nominations for Ed, Edd n Eddy
Date	Award	Category	Nominee(s)	Result
May 8, 1999	Reuben Awards	Best Television Animation	Danny Antonucci	Won
May 6, 2000	Leo Awards	Best Director in an Animated Production or Series	Danny Antonucci	Won
May 11, 2001	Leo Awards	Best Musical Score of an Animation Program or Series	Patric Caird for "Ed in a Halfshell"	Nominated
November 10, 2001	Annie Awards	Outstanding Individual Achievement for Storyboarding in an Animated Television Production	James Wootton for "Wish You Were Ed"	Nominated
May 8, 2004	Leo Awards	Best Musical Score of an Animation Program or Series	Patric Caird for "Postcards from the Ed"	Nominated
May 27, 2005	Leo Awards	Best Musical Score of an Animation Program or Series	Patric Caird	Won
April 1, 2005	Kids' Choice Awards	Favorite Cartoon	Ed, Edd n Eddy	Nominated
May 12, 2006	Leo Awards	Best Musical Score in an Animation Program	Patric Caird for "Boo Haw Haw"	Nominated
June 1, 2007	Leo Awards	Best Musical Score in an Animation Program	Patric Caird for "This Won't Hurt an Ed"	Nominated
March 29, 2008	Kids' Choice Awards	Favorite Cartoon	Ed, Edd n Eddy	Nominated
November 23, 2009	SOCAN Awards	International Television Series Music Award	Patric Caird	Won

== Other media ==
=== Film ===
The made-for-TV movie Ed, Edd n Eddy's Big Picture Show serves as the series' finale and premiered in the United States on November 8, 2009; although it had completed production a year earlier and first aired in Scandinavia, Australia, and Southeast Asia. The plot focuses on the Eds' search for Eddy's Brother, a character mentioned several times throughout the series, but never seen until the film. He is voiced by series voice director Terry Klassen. The film was directed by Antonucci, who also co-wrote the script with Rachel Connor, Jono Howard, Mike Kubat, and Stacy Warnick. The story was written by Joel Dickie, Steve Garcia, Jim Miller, Raven Molisee, and Scott Underwood, while the score was written by series composer Patric Caird. The film achieved broad ratings success for Cartoon Network with high delivery gains.

=== Home media ===
The first two seasons of Ed, Edd n Eddy were released on DVD by Warner Home Video in the US and Madman Entertainment in Australia in 2006 and 2007. The Fools' Par-Ed-Ise DVD, the DVDs of the first two seasons, and several Ed, Edd n Eddy T-shirts were available for purchase on the Cartoon Network Shop. Selected episodes from the series were also featured on various Cartoon Network compilation DVDs. All five seasons of the series, as well as Ed, Edd n Eddy's Big Picture Show, are available for download on the iTunes Store. The first four seasons were available on Netflix from March 2013 until March 2015. The third season can be downloaded at Google Play. The Eds and Sarah have been free toys in children's meals for Subway. In the United Kingdom the character of Eddy was given away in Kellogg's cereal boxes as one of the Cartoon Network Wobble Heads in 2003. On January 1, 2021, all six seasons were added to the HBO Max streaming service; the single-episode sixth season was combined into the fifth season. The show, along with Foster's Home for Imaginary Friends, received a complete series DVD release on October 18, 2022, although it was missing the 3 holiday specials and the movie. Amazon Prime added the complete series to its streaming library in December 2022, including the holiday specials and Ed, Edd n Eddy's Big Picture Show, until it was taken off the service later on. In March 2026, Tubi added the complete series, plus the specials and movie.

DVD release date history for Ed, Edd n Eddy
Title	Episodes	Release date			Description
Title	Episodes	Region 1	Region 2	Region 4	Description
Edifying Ed-Ventures	3	May 10, 2005	May 15, 2006	—N/a	Contains six segments: "Sir Ed-a-Lot," "Who, What, Where, Ed," "Avast Ye Eds," "Know-It-All Ed," "Mirror, Mirror, on the Ed," and "Hot Buttered Ed." Bonus features include "Club Ed: The Rules and Regulations," "My Best Friend Plank" music video, "Plank's Perspective," and The Grim Adventures of Billy & Mandy episode "Nursery Crimes."
Fools' Par-Ed-Ise	3	March 21, 2006	—N/a	—N/a	Contains six segments: "If It Smells Like an Ed," "Take This Ed and Shove It," "One Size Fits Ed," "A Case of Ed," "Here's Mud in Your Ed," and "Fool on the Ed." Bonus features include a studio tour, "The Plank Family Players," and a behind-the-scenes look at Ed, Edd n Eddy: The Mis-Edventures.
The Complete First Season	13	October 10, 2006	—N/a	July 18, 2007	Contains all 26 segments from the first season. Bonus features include an interview with the creator, "How to Make an Ed, Edd n Eddy Cartoon," "How to Draw Eddy," and a Cartoon Network commercial bumper featuring Jimmy and Plank.
The Complete Second Season	13	April 24, 2007	—N/a	—N/a	Contains all 26 segments from the second season. Bonus features include "Behind the Eds," "The Incredible Shrinking Day" music video, and "How to Draw Ed."
The Complete Series	66	October 18, 2022	—N/a	—N/a	Contains all episodes from seasons 1-6; does not include holiday specials or Ed, Edd n Eddy's Big Picture Show. Includes special features from The Complete First Season and The Complete Second Season.

=== Publications ===
Ed, Edd n Eddy was regularly featured in DC Comics' Cartoon Network Block Party (originally Cartoon Cartoons, the collective name of original Cartoon Network series from 1995 to 2003) comic books, along with other Cartoon Network series. Two books based on the series have been released, both published by Scholastic Inc. in 2005: Ed, Edd n Eddy: Lots of Laughs, written by Jesse Leon McCann, and Ed, Edd n Eddy: Book of Extreme Excuses, written by Howie Dewin.

=== Shorts ===
Cartoon Network produced short cartoons involving the Eds which were shown during commercial breaks. A short music video was produced with stylized versions of Ed, Edd, Eddy, and Sarah, entitled "The Incredible Shrinking Day" (listed on the Season 2 DVD as "I'm Not Coming in Anymore"), which aired on Cartoon Network in 2002 and 2003. In the video, Sarah uses a potion to shrink the Eds to a size capable of playing in her dollhouse, with predictable results. Plank starred in a similar video called "My Best Friend Plank," which aired in 2002.

=== Video games ===
Four video games based on the series have been produced. Ed, Edd n Eddy: Jawbreakers! was released on September 15, 2003, for the Game Boy Advance. Ed, Edd n Eddy: Giant Jawbreakers was released on March 4, 2004, for mobile phones. Ed, Edd n Eddy: The Mis-Edventures was released in 2005 for the GameCube, PlayStation 2, Xbox, Game Boy Advance, and Microsoft Windows. The most recent game, Ed, Edd n Eddy: Scam of the Century, was released for the Nintendo DS on October 26, 2007. The games were met with generally mixed reception.

Characters and locations from the show appear in other Cartoon Network video games, including 2003's Cartoon Network: Block Party and Cartoon Network Speedway. All three main characters, and the Kanker sisters, appear as non-playable "Nano" characters in the massively multiplayer online game Cartoon Network Universe: FusionFall.
