= Jones =

Jones or Joneses may refer to:

== People and fictional characters ==
- Jones (surname), a common Welsh and English surname
- List of people with surname Jones, including fictional characters
  - Justice Jones (disambiguation)
  - Judge Jones (disambiguation)
- Jones (singer), a British singer-songwriter
- Jones of Faerdref Uchaf, a Welsh noble family
- Generation Jones, the generation of people born between 1954 and 1965
- Jones (Animal Farm), a human character in George Orwell's novel Animal Farm

== Places ==
- Jones (Martian crater), an impact crater on Mars
- Jones, Ontario, Canada
- Jones, Isabela, Philippines
- Banton, Romblon, Philippines (formerly as Jones)

=== United States ===
- Jones, Alabama
- Jones, Illinois
- Jones, Kentucky
- Jones, Michigan
- Jones, Oklahoma
- Jones, West Virginia
- Jones Township (disambiguation)

== Arts and entertainment ==
- Jones!, a New Zealand television channel
- "Jones" (Law & Order: Criminal Intent), an episode of the TV series
- "Jones", a song from the album Certain Things Are Likely by Kissing the Pink
- The Joneses (film), a 2009 U.S. film

== Groups, organisations, companies ==
- Jones Bootmaker, a UK-based footwear retailer
- Jones Soda, a brand of soda pop
- Jones Sewing Machine Company, a British manufacturer acquired by Brother Industries
- L&F Jones, a British retail and hotel company
- The Joneses (band), a U.S. punk band

== Science and technology ==
- Jones (unit), a measure of specific detectivity
- Jones calculus, a description of polarization in optics

== Other uses ==
- Galaxy Stadium, a stadium in Lubbock, Texas, USA; known as "The Jones" as its name from 1947 to 2026 was one of several variants of "Jones Stadium"
- Jones (slang), an intense craving

== See also ==
- Mr. Jones (disambiguation)
- Mrs. Jones (disambiguation)
- Keeping up with the Joneses (disambiguation)
- Jone (disambiguation)
- Jon (disambiguation)
