= List of Ed, Edd n Eddy episodes =

Ed, Edd n Eddy title card

Ed, Edd n Eddy is a 69-episode (130-segment) animated comedy television series created by Danny Antonucci and produced by Canada-based a.k.a. Cartoon. The series debuted on Cartoon Network in the United States on January 4, 1999, and ended on November 8, 2009, with the film Ed, Edd n Eddy's Big Picture Show. The series was originally planned to air for four seasons, but Cartoon Network ordered two additional seasons, four specials, and a film as a result of its popularity, for a total of 135 segments. The series revolves around three adolescent boys collectively known as "the Eds", who live in a suburban Cul-de-Sac. Unofficially led by Eddy, the Eds frequently try to obtain money from other children in their cul-de-sac in order to purchase jawbreakers. The Eds' plans usually fail and leave them in various predicaments.

Feeling confined to gross and edgy work, such as his previous series The Brothers Grunt, artist Danny Antonucci decided to produce an animated children's television show similar to classic cartoons from the 1940s to the 1970s. Antonucci spent months designing the show and then pitched the series to Nickelodeon, but the network declined to give him creative control, which Antonucci refused. He then pitched the series to Cartoon Network. The network commissioned the show after agreeing to let Antonucci go in his own direction. The first two seasons were released on DVD in 2006 and 2007. Two DVD volumes were also released: Edifying Ed-Ventures on May 10, 2005, in Region 1 and in Region 2 on May 16, 2006, and Fools' Par-Ed-Ise on March 31, 2006, in Region 1. Selected episodes were featured in Cartoon Network compilation DVDs. The six seasons, as well as the Invaded special, were released on a DVD box set in Region 1 on October 18, 2022. The first five seasons and the Invaded special in addition to the Big Picture Show film are available for download on the iTunes Store, while only the first five seasons are available for sale from Fandango at Home in the United States. The Halloween special "Ed, Edd n Eddy's Boo Haw Haw" is available as part of "Cartoon Network's Super Scary Showcase" on the iTunes Store, but only to the UK. The third season can be downloaded from the Google Play store and Amazon.com.

Ed, Edd n Eddy received generally positive reviews from critics. Viewed from 31 million households worldwide in 29 countries, Ed, Edd n Eddy was popular among both younger and older viewers. During its run, the series won a Reuben Award, two Leo Awards and a SOCAN Award out of a total of 11 award nominations, which include one Reuben Award, six Leo Awards, one Annie Awards, two Kids' Choice Awards and the SOCAN Award. It remains the longest-running original Cartoon Network series and Canadian-made animated series to date.

== Series overview ==
Season	Episodes	Segments	Originally released	
Season	Episodes	Segments	First released	Last released
1	13	26	January 4, 1999	June 11, 1999
2	13	26	November 26, 1999	December 22, 2000
3	13	26	April 6, 2001	November 1, 2002
4	13	24	July 5, 2002	November 5, 2004
Specials	3	N/A	December 3, 2004	October 28, 2005
5	13	23	October 1, 2005	May 11, 2007
6	1	2	February 14, 2008	
Television film			November 8, 2009	

== Episodes ==
=== Season 1 (1999) ===
No. overall	No. in season	Title	Directed by	Written by	Storyboard by	Original release date	Prod. code
1	1	"The Ed-touchables"	Danny Antonucci	Jono Howard & Danny Antonucci	Billy Zeats, Conrad Schmidt, Leah Waldron, Karen Lloyd, & Rob Boutilier	January 4, 1999	102
1	1	"Nagged to Ed"	Danny Antonucci	Mike Kubat (uncredited), Jono Howard, & Danny Antonucci	Gerry Fournier & Jeff Barker	January 4, 1999	102
2	2	"Pop Goes the Ed"	Danny Antonucci	Jono Howard & Danny Antonucci	Unknown	January 11, 1999	101
2	2	"Over Your Ed"	Danny Antonucci	Jono Howard & Danny Antonucci	Unknown	January 11, 1999	101
3	3	"Sir Ed-a-Lot"	Danny Antonucci	Jono Howard & Danny Antonucci	Joel Dickie & Scott "Diggs" Underwood	January 18, 1999	103
3	3	"A Pinch to Grow an Ed"	Danny Antonucci	Jono Howard & Danny Antonucci	Unknown	January 18, 1999	103
4	4	"Dawn of the Eds"	Danny Antonucci	Jono Howard, Danny Antonucci, & Rob Boutilier	Unknown	January 25, 1999	104
4	4	"Virt-Ed-Go"	Danny Antonucci	Mike Kubat & Danny Antonucci	Unknown	January 25, 1999	104
5	5	"Read All About Ed"	Danny Antonucci	Mike Kubat & Danny Antonucci	Unknown	February 1, 1999	105
5	5	"Quick Shot Ed"	Danny Antonucci	Mike Kubat & Danny Antonucci	Unknown	February 1, 1999	105
6	6	"An Ed Too Many"	Danny Antonucci	Mike Kubat, Jono Howard, & Danny Antonucci	Unknown	February 8, 1999	106
6	6	"Ed-n-Seek"	Danny Antonucci	Jono Howard & Danny Antonucci	Unknown	February 8, 1999	106
7	7	"Look Into My Eds"	Danny Antonucci	Jono Howard & Danny Antonucci	Unknown	March 1, 1999	107
7	7	"Tag Yer Ed"	Danny Antonucci	Jono Howard & Danny Antonucci	Unknown	March 1, 1999	107
8	8	"Fool on the Ed"	Danny Antonucci	Jono Howard & Danny Antonucci	Unknown	March 8, 1999	108
8	8	"A Boy and His Ed"	Danny Antonucci	Jono Howard & Danny Antonucci	Unknown	March 8, 1999	108
9	9	"It's Way Ed"	Danny Antonucci	Jono Howard & Danny Antonucci	Unknown	March 15, 1999	109
9	9	"Laugh Ed Laugh"	Danny Antonucci	Jono Howard & Danny Antonucci	Unknown	March 15, 1999	109
10	10	"A Glass of Warm Ed"	Danny Antonucci	Jono Howard & Danny Antonucci	Unknown	April 12, 1999	110
10	10	"Flea Bitten Ed"	Danny Antonucci	Jono Howard & Danny Antonucci	Unknown	April 12, 1999	110
11	11	"Who, What, Where, Ed!"	Danny Antonucci	Mike Kubat & Danny Antonucci	Unknown	April 19, 1999	111
11	11	"Keeping Up with the Eds"	Danny Antonucci	Mike Kubat & Danny Antonucci	Unknown	April 19, 1999	111
12	12	"Eds-Aggerate"	Danny Antonucci	Jono Howard & Danny Antonucci	Unknown	April 26, 1999	112
12	12	"Oath to an Ed"	Danny Antonucci	Jono Howard & Danny Antonucci	Unknown	April 26, 1999	112
13	13	"Button Yer Ed"	Danny Antonucci	Jono Howard & Danny Antonucci	Unknown	June 11, 1999	113
13	13	"Avast Ye Eds"	Danny Antonucci	Mike Kubat & Danny Antonucci	Unknown	June 11, 1999	113

=== Season 2 (1999–2000) ===
No. overall	No. in season	Title	Directed by	Written by	Storyboard by	Original release date	Prod. code
14	1	"Know It All Ed"	Danny Antonucci	Jono Howard & Danny Antonucci	"Big" Jim Miller & Jason Surridge	November 26, 1999	201
14	1	"Dear Ed"	Danny Antonucci	Jono Howard & Danny Antonucci	James "Wootie" Wootton & Joel Dickie	November 26, 1999	201
15	2	"Knock Knock Who's Ed?"	Danny Antonucci	Jono Howard & Danny Antonucci	Leah Waldron & Rob Boutilier	February 11, 2000	202
15	2	"One + One = Ed"	Danny Antonucci	Jono Howard & Danny Antonucci	Scott "Diggs" Underwood & Pat Pakula	February 11, 2000	202
16	3	"Eeny, Meeny, Miney, Ed"	Danny Antonucci	Jono Howard & Danny Antonucci	"Big" Jim Miller & Jason Surridge	March 3, 2000	203
16	3	"Ready, Set...Ed!"	Danny Antonucci	Jono Howard & Danny Antonucci	Scott "Diggs" Underwood & Pat Pakula	March 3, 2000	203
17	4	"Hands Across Ed"	Danny Antonucci	Jono Howard & Danny Antonucci	Leah Waldron & Rob Boutilier	March 24, 2000	204
17	4	"Floss Your Ed"	Danny Antonucci	Jono Howard & Danny Antonucci	Timothy Packford & Scott "Diggs" Underwood	March 24, 2000	204
18	5	"In Like Ed"	Danny Antonucci	Jono Howard & Danny Antonucci	"Big" Jim Miller & Jason Surridge	April 7, 2000	205
18	5	"Who Let the Ed In?"	Danny Antonucci	Jono Howard, Mike Kubat, & Danny Antonucci	Mauro Casalese & Scott "Diggs" Underwood	April 7, 2000	205
19	6	"Homecooked Eds"	Danny Antonucci	Mike Kubat & Danny Antonucci	Tout Le Monde	May 12, 2000	206
19	6	"Rambling Ed"	Danny Antonucci	Jono Howard & Danny Antonucci	James "Wootie" Wootton & Scott "Diggs" Underwood	May 12, 2000	206
20	7	"To Sir with Ed"	Danny Antonucci	Robert Leighton, Jono Howard, & Danny Antonucci	"Big" Jim Miller, Scott "Diggs" Underwood, & Rob Boutilier	June 23, 2000	207
20	7	"Key to My Ed"	Danny Antonucci	Jono Howard, Mike Kubat, & Danny Antonucci	Rob Boutilier & Joel Dickie	June 23, 2000	207
21	8	"Urban Ed"	Danny Antonucci	Jono Howard & Danny Antonucci	Leah Waldron & Timothy Packford	July 21, 2000	208
21	8	"Stop, Look and Ed"	Danny Antonucci	Jono Howard & Danny Antonucci	Timothy Packford, Leah Waldron, & Scott "Diggs" Underwood	July 21, 2000	208
22	9	"Honor Thy Ed"	Danny Antonucci	Mike Kubat & Danny Antonucci	Joel Dickie & James "Wootie" Wootton	August 4, 2000	209
22	9	"Scrambled Ed"	Danny Antonucci	Mike Kubat & Danny Antonucci	"Big" Jim Miller, Rob Boutilier, & Scott "Diggs" Underwood	August 4, 2000	209
23	10	"Rent-an-Ed"	Danny Antonucci	Jono Howard & Danny Antonucci	James "Wootie" Wootton & Joel Dickie	August 18, 2000	210
23	10	"Shoo Ed"	Danny Antonucci	Mike Kubat & Danny Antonucci	"Big" Jim Miller	August 18, 2000	210
24	11	"Ed in a Halfshell"	Danny Antonucci	Jono Howard & Danny Antonucci	Rob Boutilier	September 8, 2000	211
24	11	"Mirror, Mirror, on the Ed"	Danny Antonucci	Jono Howard & Danny Antonucci	Scott "Diggs" Underwood, Rob Boutilier, & "Big" Jim Miller	September 8, 2000	211
25	12	"Hot Buttered Ed"	Danny Antonucci	Jono Howard & Danny Antonucci	Leah Waldron	October 27, 2000	212
25	12	"High Heeled Ed"	Danny Antonucci	Jono Howard & Danny Antonucci	Leah Waldron & Timothy Packford	October 27, 2000	212
26	13	"Fa-La-La-La-Ed"	Danny Antonucci	Jono Howard & Danny Antonucci	James "Wootie" Wootton & Joel Dickie	December 22, 2000	213
26	13	"Cry Ed"	Danny Antonucci	Jono Howard, Mike Kubat, & Danny Antonucci	Tout Le Monde	December 22, 2000	213

=== Season 3 (2001–2002) ===
No. overall	No. in season	Title	Directed by	Written by	Storyboard by	Original release date	Prod. code
27	1	"Wish You Were Ed"	Danny Antonucci	Jono Howard & Danny Antonucci	James "Wootie" Wootton	April 6, 2001	301
27	1	"Momma's Little Ed"	Danny Antonucci	Marlowe Weisman, Jono Howard, & Danny Antonucci	Leah Waldron	April 6, 2001	301
"Wish You Were Ed" – Rolf grows tired of the modern life in the cul-de-sac and longs for the Old Village, so Eddy creates a makeshift village to scam Rolf.; "Momma's Little Ed" – Ed and Eddy create chores on forged sticky notes to prank Edd.; These are first episodes to have a voice of Jenn Forgie as Nazz and May in Season 3.
28	2	"Once Upon an Ed"	Danny Antonucci	Jono Howard & Danny Antonucci	Joel Dickie	May 25, 2001	302
28	2	"For Your Ed Only"	Danny Antonucci	Jono Howard & Danny Antonucci	Timothy Packford	May 25, 2001	302
"Once Upon an Ed" – Jonny and Plank are ready for bed, only to discover that the Eds are somehow trapped in Jonny's wall. The Eds have three different stories to tell, none of which agree.; "For Your Ed Only" – After destroying Sarah's room, the Eds come across her diary and Eddy reads it while the kids look for it.
29	3	"It Came from Outer Ed"	Danny Antonucci	Jono Howard & Danny Antonucci	"Big" Jim Miller	October 19, 2001	303
29	3	"3 Squares and an Ed"	Danny Antonucci	Jono Howard & Danny Antonucci	Joel Dickie	October 19, 2001	303
"It Came from Outer Ed" – Ed recreates a scam from one of his comic books.; "3 Squares and an Ed" – When Edd and Eddy discover that Ed has been grounded, they try to bail him out without Sarah and Jimmy knowing, but fail.
30	4	"Dueling Eds"	Danny Antonucci	John Mein, Jono Howard, & Danny Antonucci	Scott "Diggs" Underwood	December 14, 2001	304
30	4	"Dim Lit Ed"	Danny Antonucci	Jono Howard & Danny Antonucci	Rob Boutilier & Vern Marcus	December 14, 2001	304
"Dueling Eds" – After Eddy unintentionally offends Rolf, the latter challenges the former to a duel.; "Dim Lit Ed" – Fed up with the cul-de-sac's low intelligence, Edd organizes a scavenger hunt, with the prize supposedly being a jawbreaker. Meanwhile, Ed and Eddy start an exotic pet scam.; This episode is dedicated to Shawn "Wilfrid" Godin.
31	5	"Will Work for Ed"	Danny Antonucci	Mike Kubat & Danny Antonucci	James "Wootie" Wootton	January 4, 2002	305
31	5	"Ed, Ed and Away"	Danny Antonucci	Jono Howard & Danny Antonucci	Leah Waldron	January 4, 2002	305
"Will Work for Ed" – The Eds are broke, so they help Rolf on his farm in order to get money for jawbreakers.; "Ed, Ed and Away" – The Eds try to catch a loose balloon, causing mayhem in the process.
32	6	"An Ed in the Bush"	Danny Antonucci	Mike Kubat, Jono Howard, & Danny Antonucci	"Big" Jim Miller	September 27, 2002	306
32	6	"See No Ed"	Danny Antonucci	Jono Howard & Danny Antonucci	Scott "Diggs" Underwood & Timothy Packford	September 27, 2002	306
"An Ed in the Bush" – Rolf and The Urban Rangers set off to camp in the nearby woods, where Eddy seeks to scare them in an effort to damage their reputation.; "See No Ed" – The kids are in the lane when they learn from each other that they have not seen the Eds all day. They look for them, but no luck. Kevin becomes paranoid and suspicious, and tries to convince everyone it is another nefarious plot by the Eds.
33	7	"X Marks the Ed"	Danny Antonucci	Marlowe Weisman, Jono Howard, & Danny Antonucci	Joel Dickie	January 25, 2002	307
33	7	"From Here to Ed"	Danny Antonucci	Jono Howard & Danny Antonucci	Leah Waldron	January 25, 2002	307
"X Marks the Ed" – Eddy gets a pimple and tries to hide it. Rolf volunteers to help get rid of Eddy's pimple.; "From Here to Ed" – After a scam goes wrong, Eddy blames and declares war on Kevin.
34	8	"Boys Will Be Eds"	Danny Antonucci	Jono Howard & Danny Antonucci	Scott "Diggs" Underwood & Timothy Packford	February 15, 2002	308
34	8	"Ed or Tails"	Danny Antonucci	Jono Howard & Danny Antonucci	James "Wootie" Wootton	February 15, 2002	308
"Boys Will Be Eds" – As Nazz gives them a lecture for making fun of Jimmy, all the boys (except Rolf and Jimmy) compete for her affections.; "Ed or Tails" – Ed receives a package of two Slovak Brand jawbreakers he ordered. Since there are not enough for the three of them, they try to solve the problem so they can all enjoy the jawbreakers.
35	9	"Is There an Ed in the House?"	Danny Antonucci	Jono Howard & Danny Antonucci	Leah Waldron	November 1, 2002	309
35	9	"An Ed Is Born"	Danny Antonucci	Geoff Berner & Danny Antonucci	James "Wootie" Wootton	November 1, 2002	309
"Is There an Ed in the House?" – The Eds are "taking a picture" of Rolf in their latest scam when they find out that Sarah is sick. Ed and Jimmy both do what they can to take care of her and nurse her back to health, which starts a rivalry between them.; "An Ed Is Born" – After Eddy receives baby items from his brother in the mail, he and the other Eds make a home movie to show how mature and popular he is.
36	10	"Gimme, Gimme Never Ed"	Danny Antonucci	Jono Howard & Danny Antonucci	Joel Dickie	March 8, 2002	310
36	10	"My Fair Ed"	Danny Antonucci	Jono Howard & Danny Antonucci	Scott "Diggs" Underwood & Timothy Packford	March 8, 2002	310
"Gimme, Gimme Never Ed" – Jonny thinks that the Eds' surf school scam gone wrong is a ride, so the Eds make thrilling rides for Plank.; "My Fair Ed" – After being threatened by the other kids, Edd turns Ed and Eddy into polite people like him. This backfires when they both go overboard with niceness.
37	11	"Rock-a-Bye Ed"	Danny Antonucci	Jono Howard & Danny Antonucci	"Big" Jim Miller	March 22, 2002	311
37	11	"O-Ed Eleven"	Danny Antonucci	Mike Kubat & Danny Antonucci	"Big" Jim Miller	March 22, 2002	311
"Rock-a-Bye Ed" – Ed dreams that Jonny is his mother, who punishes him. As a result, Ed develops an irrational fear of Jonny.; "O-Ed Eleven" – While going through his brother's old stuff, Eddy and his friends stumble upon a map to Eddy's brother's "secret stash" and decipher it, only to find it lies underneath the Kankers' trailer.; This is the last episode to have a voice of Jenn Forgie as May in Season 3.
38	12	"The Luck of the Ed"	Danny Antonucci	Geoff Berner & Danny Antonucci	Leah Waldron & D. Brad Gibson	June 21, 2002	312
38	12	"Ed...Pass It On..."	Danny Antonucci	Mike Kubat & Danny Antonucci	Joel Dickie	June 21, 2002	312
"The Luck of the Ed" – Eddy makes Ed hide his secret magazines from his mother. Ed loses them, so they try looking for them, with Eddy seeing Ed and Edd as suspects.; "Ed...Pass It On..." – After Eddy's restaurant scam fails, Eddy decides to start a rumor about his older brother coming home that eventually gets out of hand.
39	13	"Brother, Can You Spare an Ed"	Danny Antonucci	Jono Howard & Danny Antonucci	Timothy Packford & Kent Webb	June 28, 2002	313
39	13	"The Day the Ed Stood Still"	Danny Antonucci	Mike Kubat & Danny Antonucci	Todd Demong & Werner Marcus	June 28, 2002	313
"Brother, Can You Spare an Ed" – Sarah gives Ed her allowance to go and buy fudge, but Eddy pressures Ed into buying jawbreakers for the three of them instead. To pay Sarah back, the Eds conduct a scam involving a piñata and a wedgie.; "The Day the Ed Stood Still" – When Edd and Eddy dress Ed as a monster, he is convinced he is an actual monster, wreaking havoc and terrorizing everyone in sight.; This is the last episode to have a voice of Jenn Forgie as Nazz in Season 3.

=== Season 4 (2002–2004) ===
No. overall	No. in season	Title	Directed by	Written by	Storyboard by	Original release date	Prod. code
40	1	"If It Smells Like an Ed"	Danny Antonucci	Geoff Berner, Jono Howard, & Danny Antonucci	James "Wootie" Wootton	July 5, 2002	401
When Eddy gives Jimmy a wedgie and humiliates him, the Eds are suddenly framed for various misdeeds, so the trio set off to find the real culprit to clear their names and earn back everyone's trust.: This is the first episode marks the return of Erin Fitzgerald as the voice Nazz and May for the duration of the series.
41	2	"Don't Rain on My Ed"	Danny Antonucci	Geoff Berner & Danny Antonucci	Todd Demong & Werner Marcus	July 12, 2002	402
41	2	"Once Bitten Twice Ed"	Danny Antonucci	Jono Howard & Danny Antonucci	Joel Dickie	July 12, 2002	402
"Don't Rain on My Ed" – When Eddy discovers it is "Customer Appreciation Day" at the candy store, where they are giving away free jawbreakers, they try to make it before they close in ten minutes, but their progress is hampered due to a series of hindrances.; "Once Bitten Twice Ed" – Eddy keeps on using the same failed scam plot over and over with minor tweaks. The kids, as well as Ed and Edd, are repeatedly unimpressed, but Eddy never gives up.
42	3	"One Size Fits Ed"	Danny Antonucci	Brent Miller, Aaron Maclaughlan, Jono Howard, & Danny Antonucci	James "Wootie" Wootton	November 15, 2002	403
42	3	"Pain in the Ed"	Danny Antonucci	Geoff Berner, Jono Howard, & Danny Antonucci	Scott "Diggs" Underwood	November 15, 2002	403
"One Size Fits Ed" – Eddy decides to make Jimmy a sumo wrestler.; "Pain in the Ed" – Eddy tries to destroy the violin that Ed plays terribly, but he must do so without letting Sarah or Jimmy know.
43	4	"Ed Overboard"	Danny Antonucci	Jono Howard & Danny Antonucci	Timothy Packford & Kent Webb	August 24, 2003	404
43	4	"One of Those Eds"	Danny Antonucci	Mike Kubat & Danny Antonucci	Scott "Diggs" Underwood, Charlie Chien, & Julian Lawrence	August 24, 2003	404
"Ed Overboard" – After a makeover prank gives May a bad case of the blues, her sisters decide to cheer her up by kidnapping Ed. Edd and Eddy turn to the Urban Rangers to save Ed.; "One of Those Eds" – Eddy finds a quarter mysteriously stuck to the sidewalk, but soon it becomes a free-for-all, as the other kids begin to fight over it, only to all be unsuccessful at picking it up off the ground.
44	5	"They Call Him Mr. Ed"	Danny Antonucci	Mike Kubat & Danny Antonucci	Timothy Packford & Kent Webb	November 10, 2003	405
44	5	"For the Ed by the Ed"	Danny Antonucci	Mike Kubat & Danny Antonucci	Leah Waldron	November 10, 2003	405
"They Call Him Mr. Ed" – Eddy starts his own company as part of a scheme to help himself and his friends move "up" in the world.; "For the Ed by the Ed" – After rescuing Jimmy from the Kankers and a centipede, Plank is praised as the "King of the Cul-de-sac". Eddy challenges Plank to an election, using his scheming ways to win.
45	6	"Little Ed Blue"	Danny Antonucci	Jono Howard & Danny Antonucci	Timothy Packford & Kent Webb	November 17, 2003	406
45	6	"A Twist of Ed"	Danny Antonucci	Jono Howard & Danny Antonucci	Tout Le Monde	November 17, 2003	406
"Little Ed Blue" – Ed is in a bad mood, so Edd and Eddy try to cheer him up.; "A Twist of Ed" – Edd and the other Eds try to use reverse psychology to ward off the Kankers.
46	7	"Your Ed Here"	Danny Antonucci	Jono Howard & Danny Antonucci	Leah Waldron & Timothy Packford	January 23, 2004	407
46	7	"The Good Ol' Ed"	Danny Antonucci	Jono Howard & Danny Antonucci	Scott "Diggs" Underwood	January 23, 2004	407
"Your Ed Here" – After finding Eddy's wallet, Kevin begins to blackmail Eddy after learning his middle name is "Skipper".; "The Good Ol' Ed" – The Eds make a time capsule and find trinkets that remind them of scams both familiar and unfamiliar.
47	8	"Thick as an Ed"	Danny Antonucci	Jono Howard & Danny Antonucci	Tout Le Monde	January 30, 2004	408
47	8	"Sorry, Wrong Ed"	Danny Antonucci	Geoff Berner & Danny Antonucci	James "Wootie" Wootton	January 30, 2004	408
"Thick as an Ed" – Ed's 57-day-old "lucky" cheese chunk hinders Edd and Eddy from their latest scam.; "Sorry, Wrong Ed" – Rolf buries a phone that appears to be cursed; Eddy finds the phone to be stylish, so he takes it without Rolf knowing. Every time Eddy answers it, he is plagued by unfortunate mishaps.
48	9	"Robbin' Ed"	Danny Antonucci	Mike Kubat & Danny Antonucci	James "Wootie" Wootton	February 6, 2004	409
48	9	"A Case of Ed"	Danny Antonucci	Jono Howard & Danny Antonucci	Leah Waldron	February 6, 2004	409
"Robbin' Ed" – When a mysterious superhero named Captain Melonhead (a thinly-disguised Jonny, with Plank as his sidekick, "Splinter the WonderWood") steals the money back and returns it to the kids of the cul-de-sac, Eddy thinks it is payback time, and transforms himself, Edd, and Ed into the supervillain Professor Scam and his henchmen, the Cents, respectively.; "A Case of Ed" – Ed and Eddy trick Edd into believing he has a terminal illness, while taunting a grounded Kevin. Edd and Kevin team up to retaliate against them.
49	10	"Stiff Upper Ed"	Danny Antonucci	Geoff Berner & Danny Antonucci	Tout Le Monde	February 20, 2004	410
49	10	"Here's Mud in Your Ed"	Danny Antonucci	Jono Howard & Danny Antonucci	Tout Le Monde	February 20, 2004	410
"Stiff Upper Ed" – When Sarah and Jimmy start a "Rich Club" in Ed's backyard, inviting everyone except the Eds, Eddy tries to prove he has got what it takes to be a member.; "Here's Mud in Your Ed" – Jimmy suffers a bad day, feeling worse after Eddy scams him out of his last quarter. He eventually turns to Rolf, and the two team up to turn the tables on Eddy by pulling a con on him.
50	11	"Stuck in Ed"	Danny Antonucci	Jono Howard & Danny Antonucci	Leah Waldron	February 27, 2004	411
50	11	"Postcards from the Ed"	Danny Antonucci	Jono Howard & Danny Antonucci	Tout Le Monde	February 27, 2004	411
"Stuck in Ed" – After Kevin makes a mint selling his surplus jawbreakers, Eddy tries to con some of it out of him, only to find he is completely tapped for scam ideas. Eddy ends up turning to his old disciple, Jimmy for an idea.; "Postcards from the Ed" – When Plank's "parents" come to town, Ed irritates Eddy by offering to show them around the cul-de-sac, but then Eddy gets the idea to take them on his own, significantly pricier tour.
51	12	"Run for Your Ed"	Danny Antonucci	Mike Kubat & Danny Antonucci	Tout Le Monde	February 13, 2004	412
51	12	"Hand Me Down Ed"	Danny Antonucci	Jono Howard & Danny Antonucci	Tout Le Monde	February 13, 2004	412
"Run for Your Ed" – The Kankers go on the warpath through the cul-de-sac to find a missing family heirloom. Unbeknown to the Eds, the ship in a bottle that is stuck on Ed's finger is the very thing the Kankers are after.; "Hand Me Down Ed" – When a boomerang flies into the cul-de-sac, it alters the personality of anyone who touches it.
52	13	"Take This Ed and Shove It"	Danny Antonucci	Mike Kubat, Jono Howard, & Danny Antonucci	Tout Le Monde	November 5, 2004	413
Eddy finds the cul-de-sac kids are all growing up and tries to make his career out of it. Later, he gets hit by a bunch of items and sees himself and the cul-de-sac 90 years in the future. Eddy must now find a way to get himself back to being a kid.: Note 1 – This episode was the original series finale before the show's renewal.; Note 2 – This is the last episode to use traditional cel animation before switching to digital ink and paint, making Ed, Edd n Eddy the last Western animated series to abandon the technique.

=== Holiday specials (2004–2005) ===
No. overall	No. in season	Title	Directed by	Written by	Storyboard by	Original release date
53	1	"Ed, Edd n Eddy's Jingle Jingle Jangle"	Danny Antonucci	Jono Howard, Mike Kubat, & Danny Antonucci	"Big" Jim Miller, Scott "Diggs" Underwood, & Leah Waldron	December 3, 2004
Disappointed by his gifts at home on Christmas Eve, Eddy decides that if one of the other cul-de-sac children "adopts" him, he could get their presents.: Note - From this episode on, the series is animated with digital ink and paint.
54	2	"Ed, Edd n Eddy's Hanky Panky Hullabaloo"	Danny Antonucci	Jono Howard, Mike Kubat, & Danny Antonucci	"Big" Jim Miller, Scott "Diggs" Underwood, & Leah Waldron	February 11, 2005
On Valentine's Day, two cupids (played by Sarah and Jimmy) are set to fire arrows of love at all the cul-de-sac children at their school, Peach Creek Jr. High.
55	3	"Ed, Edd n Eddy's Boo Haw Haw"	Danny Antonucci	Danny Antonucci, Jono Howard, & Mike Kubat	"Big" Jim Miller, Scott "Diggs" Underwood, & Joel Dickie	October 28, 2005
Eddy receives a map from his brother to a location known as Spook-E-Ville, where the Eds plan to go trick-or-treating; matters become complicated when Ed hallucinates the other cul-de-sac children are characters from horror movies as a side effect of watching one too many prior.

=== Season 5 (2005–2007) ===
No. overall	No. in season	Title	Directed by	Written by	Storyboard by	Original release date	Prod. code
56	1	"Out with the Old...In with the Ed"	Danny Antonucci	Jono Howard, Mike Kubat, & Danny Antonucci	Sabrina Alberghetti, Sherann Johnson, Simon Piniel, & Andrew Park	November 18, 2005	501
Eddy tries to convince the other kids of the cul-de-sac that it is still summer, even though it is actually the day before school starts. At school, the Eds find they have been assigned separate homerooms, and must negotiate with the Kankers if they want to spend the school year together.: This is the first episode to use digital ink and paint.
57	2	"Mission Ed-Possible"	Danny Antonucci	Mike Kubat & Danny Antonucci	Lih Liau & Steve LeCouilliard	November 4, 2005	502
57	2	"Every Which Way But Ed"	Danny Antonucci	Jono Howard & Danny Antonucci	Sabrina Alberghetti & Simon Piniel	November 4, 2005	502
"Mission Ed-Possible" – Ed and Eddy are not too excited about report card day, as Edd is delivering their report cards to their parents. Naturally, Ed and Eddy attempt to stop him.; "Every Which Way But Ed" – Flashback episode that features alternate stories. The Eds try to make their way back to the place where all the flashbacks began. In this journey, many things are explained, including Plank's chip and Jimmy's retainer.
58	3	"Boom Boom Out Goes the Ed"	Danny Antonucci	Keith Giffen & Danny Antonucci	Sabrina Alberghetti & Ben Meinhardt	November 11, 2005	503
58	3	"Cleanliness Is Next to Edness"	Danny Antonucci	Rachel Connor & Danny Antonucci	Andrew Park & Sherann Johnson	October 1, 2005 (Stealth Premiere); November 11, 2005 (Official Premiere)	503
"Boom Boom Out Goes the Ed" – The power goes out, and everyone is wondering what happened. Ed starts a panic when he blames the blackout on "mole mutants", and Eddy tries to cash in. Meanwhile, Rolf enlists Kevin in jump-starting the power grid, and Edd overcomes his fear of the unsanitary sewers to conduct his own investigation.; "Cleanliness Is Next to Edness" – After discovering that his bathroom is undergoing renovations, Edd tries to find a shower, getting dirtier in the process.
59	4	"I Am Curious Ed"	Danny Antonucci	Jono Howard & Danny Antonucci	Steve Garcia & John Young	November 25, 2005	504
59	4	"No Speak Da Ed"	Danny Antonucci	Rachel Connor & Danny Antonucci	Lih Liau & Steve LeCouilliard	November 25, 2005	504
"I Am Curious Ed" – Sarah and Jimmy discover Jimmy's fish have babies and try to learn where they come from, but when they ask the other kids about it, they keep getting different answers.; "No Speak Da Ed" – Ed receives a variety of wolf-themed gifts from his pen-pal, and ends up suffering the wrath of Rolf, whose past involves a wolf-man.
60	5	"Cool Hand Ed"	Danny Antonucci	Jono Howard & Danny Antonucci	Steve Garcia, Sabrina Alberghetti, Sherann Johnson, & John Young	March 31, 2006	505
60	5	"Too Smart for His Own Ed"	Danny Antonucci	Mike Kubat, Rachel Connor, & Danny Antonucci	Sherann Johnson & Andrew Park	March 31, 2006	505
"Cool Hand Ed" – Fed up with school, Eddy plots a break out, enlisting the help of Ed, Edd, Jonny and Plank.; "Too Smart for His Own Ed" – When Edd loses to Ed in a spelling bee due to a slip of the tongue, the other kids think he has lost his touch, and turn to Ed for help with their homework, which Eddy charges for. However, Ed cannot think of the correct answers for them. Meanwhile, Jonny tries to get revenge on Nazz for Plank's spelling bee disqualification.
61	6	"Who's Minding the Ed"	Danny Antonucci	Jono Howard, Mike Kubat, & Danny Antonucci	Sherann Johnson & Sabrina Alberghetti	June 28, 2006	506
61	6	"Pick an Ed"	Danny Antonucci	Keith Giffen & Danny Antonucci	Steve Garcia & Andrew Park	June 28, 2006	506
"Who's Minding the Ed" – When Rolf goes to his family reunion, he puts Ed in charge of his animals, while an irksome Sarah hunts the pack down.; "Pick an Ed" – After Eddy sees that someone wrote an insult about him on a wall in the school hallway, he goes undercover as a new student to find the culprit.
62	7	"Truth or Ed"	Danny Antonucci	Michael Hockney, Rachel Connor, & Danny Antonucci	Raven Molisee & James "Wootie" Wootton	July 3, 2006	507
62	7	"This Won't Hurt an Ed"	Danny Antonucci	Rachel Connor & Danny Antonucci	Raven Molisee, Steve LeCouilliard, & John Young	July 3, 2006	507
"Truth or Ed" – Eddy take over the duties of the school newspaper, publishing and selling false articles about the other kids, only for chaos to erupt when everyone turns on each other and become suspicious of the newsroom.; "This Won't Hurt an Ed" – When Eddy discovers that Kevin has a fear of needles, he hatches a plan to exploit it and terrorize him.
63	8	"Tinker Ed"	Danny Antonucci	Rachel Connor & Danny Antonucci	Raven Molisee	August 14, 2006	508
63	8	"The Good, the Bad and the Ed"	Danny Antonucci	Jono Howard, Rachel Connor, & Danny Antonucci	Steve Garcia & Tom Sales	August 14, 2006	508
"Tinker Ed" – Jimmy no longer believes in fairy tales after yet another failed scam by the Eds. Sarah forces the Eds to fix this problem before sundown, because otherwise, it will be too late. The Eds were hoodwinked after making a disillusioned Jimmy love fairy tales again.; "The Good, the Bad and the Ed" – To humiliate the Urban Rangers once and for all, Eddy challenges Rolf for the most difficult badge.
64	9	"Tight End Ed"	Danny Antonucci	Rachel Connor, Danny Antonucci, & Jono Howard	Tom Sales & Steve Garcia	August 28, 2006	509
64	9	"'Tween a Rock and an Ed Place"	Danny Antonucci	Rachel Connor & Danny Antonucci	Sherann Johnson & Sabrina Alberghetti	August 28, 2006	509
"Tight End Ed" – Peach Creek's football team play against Lemon Brook, their rivals, with Ed as the mascot, much to Eddy's envy.; "'Tween a Rock and an Ed Place" – Jonny invites the Eds to his Arbor Day party. Eddy plans to attend, hoping to boost his popularity.
65	10	"All Eds Are Off"	Danny Antonucci	Rachel Connor, Jono Howard, & Danny Antonucci	Sherann Johnson & Sabrina Alberghetti	April 13, 2007	510
65	10	"Smile for the Ed"	Scott "Diggs" Underwood	Rachel Connor, Michael Hockney, & Danny Antonucci	Simon Piniel & Steve LeCouilliard	April 13, 2007	510
"All Eds Are Off" – The Eds, Kevin, Rolf, Nazz, and Jonny all make bets to who can put off their habits the longest.; "Smile for the Ed" – It is school picture day, and Eddy can move into his big brother's room if he brings home a good picture for his mother. When Kevin interferes and ruins his one shot, the Eds attempt to help fix his embarrassing photo.
66	11	"Run Ed Run"	Danny Antonucci	Michael Hockney, Rachel Connor, & Danny Antonucci	Steve LeCouilliard & Simon Piniel	April 20, 2007	511
66	11	"A Town Called Ed"	Danny Antonucci	Rachel Connor & Danny Antonucci	Tom Sales & Steve Garcia	April 20, 2007	511
"Run Ed Run" – Due to an argument between Eddy and Sarah about bus seating, she tricks Ed into protecting his friends from the "falling sky". Edd and Eddy cannot talk Ed out of it, but they make several attempts to catch the bus and get to the jawbreaker factory.; "A Town Called Ed" – The Eds discover a book stating that Eddy's ancestors founded Peach Creek, which Eddy attempts to use to earn attention from everyone after nobody has invited them to Kevin's party.
67	12	"A Fistful of Ed"	Danny Antonucci	Michael Hockney, Danny Antonucci, & Scott "Diggs" Underwood	Raven Molisee & "Big Jim" Miller	April 28, 2007	512
Edd accidentally hurts Lee and the other kids, making everyone believe he has resorted to violence, so he turns to Jimmy to help him get his old reputation back. Note – This was originally advertised as the "last episode" of Ed, Edd n Eddy when it premiered as the conclusion to the "Best Day Edder" marathon.
68	13	"The Eds Are Coming, the Eds Are Coming" (Note: This episode was the second of five chapters for a special network event titled "Cartoon Network Invaded", which featured five different shows having alien invasions. Otherwise, it is part of Ed, Edd n Eddy's fifth season on several official releases of the show.)	Danny Antonucci	Rachel Connor, Mike Kubat, & Danny Antonucci	James "Wootie" Wootton & "Big Jim" Miller	May 11, 2007	513
After Jimmy has a nightmare where alien spaceships invade the cul-de-sac, he becomes convinced it will happen in real life.

=== Season 6 (2008) ===
Even though this single-episode season aired in late June 2008, it was the last official episode to be produced alongside the finale of the previous season and the Cartoon Network Invaded special, noting that a film adaption was in production by November 2007.

No. overall	No. in season	Title	Directed by	Written by	Storyboard by	Original release date	Prod. code
69	1	"May I Have This Ed?"	Danny Antonucci	Stacy Warnick & Danny Antonucci	Raven Molisee & Sabrina Alberghetti	February 14, 2008	601
69	1	"Look Before You Ed"	Danny Antonucci	Stacy Warnick, Rachel Connor, & Danny Antonucci	Scott Underwood & Steve Garcia	February 14, 2008	601
"May I Have This Ed?" – The Peach Creek Jr. High school dance is coming up—while Eddy is excited about it, Edd is not looking forward to it.; "Look Before You Ed" – Edd and Jimmy decide to run a safety club to curb wintertime hazards.; Note – This episode is dedicated to the memory of Paul Boyd.

=== Television film (2009) ===
Title	Directed by	Written by	Release date (U.S.)
Ed, Edd n Eddy's Big Picture Show	Danny Antonucci	Jono Howard, Mike Kubat, Rachel Connor, Stacy Warnick, and Danny Antonucci	November 8, 2009
After a scam terribly damaged the kids, they hunt down the Eds for revenge, leading the trio setting off an adventure for Eddy's brother so he can help them.
