= JBVO =

Cartoon Network talk show, 2000 to 2001

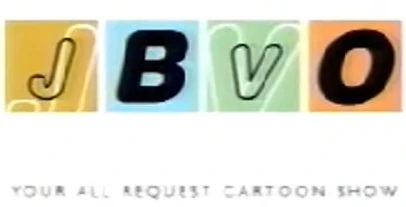
- Network: Cartoon Network
- Launched: February 9, 2000
- Closed: January 14, 2001 (original) August 26, 2001 (reruns)
- Country of origin: United States
- Owner: Van Partible
- Formerly known as: WBVO (pilot only)
- Sister network: The Big Bravo Live Toon FM Viva Las Bravo
- Running time: 21 to 26 minutes
- Original language: English
- Official website: Official website

JBVO: Your All Request Cartoon Show (or JBVO for short) is an American anthology talk show programming block that aired Sundays from February 9, 2000, to January 14, 2001, with reruns continuing until it was fully removed on August 26, 2001, on Cartoon Network as a supplement to Johnny Bravo. In the show hosted by Johnny Bravo, along with some infrequent guest stars such as Chicken (from Cow and Chicken), callers would write into the show via mail or through the Cartoon Network website.

Production continued after its pilot aired. In February 2000, Johnny "hosted" Cartoon Network live in the UK from February 21–25, two months before JBVO officially premiered in the US. This event was called The Big Bravo-Live!, as it was based on another successful block Johnny hosted in late 1999 by the same name. The block premiered on April 2, 2000, as JBVO.

A marathon titled JBVO Weekend aired in 2000. By late 2000, the block's popularity was waning. Series creator Van Partible was not interested in making JBVO to begin with. On January 14, 2001, the series ended after 1 season and 28 episodes produced. The show still continued to air reruns until August 26, 2001.

== Premise ==
Like The Moxy Show and Space Ghost Coast to Coast, Johnny Bravo is the host of the show, along with some infrequent guest stars such as Chicken (from Cow and Chicken). Callers would write into the show via mail or through the Cartoon Network website to call the show and request a cartoon from Cartoon Network's cartoon library, including shorts and shows from Warner Bros., MGM, Hanna-Barbera, Cartoon Network Studios, and other Turner Entertainment-owned shorts as well as material commissioned by or licensed to Cartoon Network from other studios which would then be played, with an exception of half-hour-long shows.

One caller of the show named Jennifer requested an episode of Dragon Ball Z. Being that it was a half-hour long, Johnny regretfully had to fast-forward through the entire episode with Johnny providing only expositional commentary. Afterwards, Johnny apologized to the caller for the inconvenience. The episode was assumed lost before resurfacing in 2023.

== Characters from different shows ==
- Brak - A cat alien who appears in various polls and appears in JBVO sequel Toon FM. Originally from Space Ghost and its reinterpretation Space Ghost Coast to Coast.
- Chicken - A chicken who appears as one of the guest stars or directors, originally from Cow and Chicken
- Daphne - A lady who is one of the five members of Mystery Inc., as Johnny tells her to pick him up for a date after his show. Originally from Scooby-Doo.
- Dexter - A scientist who appears as one of the directors, originally from Dexter's Laboratory.
- Fred Jones - A man who is one of the five members of Mystery Inc., as he appears as a director of the show. Originally from Scooby-Doo.
- I.R. Baboon - A baboon who appears as one of the guest stars or directors, originally from Cow and Chicken's segment and sequel, I Am Weasel.
- Shaggy - A man who is one of the five members of Mystery Inc., as he appears as a director of the show. Originally from Scooby-Doo.

== Episodes ==
=== Series overview ===
Season	Episodes	Originally released	
Season	Episodes	First released	Last released
1	28	April 2, 2000	January 14, 2001

=== Pilot (1999) ===
No.	Title	Directed by	Written by	Original release date	Guest(s)	Prod. code
0	"WBVO"	Doug Grimmett	Michael Ouweleen, Pete Johnson	December 27, 1999 February 9, 2000 (official airdate)	Dennis and RJ, Phillip, Kat	TBA
Johnny Bravo sets a poll for what is Bugs Bunny's most famous insult. Note: The name of the pilot was ultimately later changed to JBVO when the show was greenlit due to unknown reasons.

=== Show (2000–2001) ===
No.	Title	Written by	Original release date	Guest(s)	Prod. code
1	"VO Show #1"	Craig "Sven Gordon"	April 2, 2000	Allyson, Jamie	TBA
Johnny Bravo explains how to get your request to him.
2	"Is My Hair High Enough?"	Craig "Sven Gordon"	April 9, 2000	Andrew, Jacob, Sam	TBA
Johnny gets confused after reading Andrew's message thinking he was Ed, Edd and Eddy.
3	"I'm The Magic Man"	Craig "Sven" Gordon	April 16, 2000	Bill and Willy, Rebecca	TBA
Johnny tells Willy to say some catchphrases Johnny has.
4	"Wait for the Count"	Craig "Sven" Gordon	April 23, 2000	Alisha, Ashley, Crystal	TBA
Johnny helps Ashley with his confusion with the names of the boys from Ed, Edd n Eddy.
5	"Mr. Excitement"	Craig "Sven" Gordon	April 30, 2000	Dan and Will, Duncan, and Linda	TBA
Johnny tries to get Duncan to talk serious on the phone.
6	"I've Been Practicing"	Craig "Sven" Gordon, Michael Ouweleen, Pete Johnson	May 7, 2000	Blake, Jennifer, Jordan	TBA
Due to Dragon Ball Z being 22 minutes long, Johnny has to fast forward the episode for Jennifer.
7	"Celebrate Your Mama"	Craig "Sven" Gordon	May 14, 2000	Brian, Asha, Jimmy	TBA
Johnny predicts he had seen the short Brian requested 400 times.
8	"Extensions"	Craig "Sven" Gordon	May 21, 2000	Sara, Johnny, Fred	TBA
Johnny gives a view to the viewers of the fashion of Scooby-Doo villains.
9	"Another Monkey Dance"	Craig "Sven" Gordon	May 28, 2000	Michael and Mary, Daniel, Austin and Owen	TBA
Johnny promises to be quiet during Michael and Mary's request, but he keeps talking.
10	"Show #10"	Craig "Sven" Gordon	June 11, 2000	TBA	TBA
11	"It's Gotta Be in a Cone"	Craig "Sven" Gordon	June 18, 2000	TBA	TBA
Note:
12	"I Was Born Ready"	Craig "Sven" Gordon	June 25, 2000	TBA	TBA
13	"You Sound Down"	Craig "Sven" Gordon	July 2, 2000	TBA	TBA
This episode aired during the commercials.
14	"Show #14"	Craig "Sven" Gordon	July 9, 2000	TBA	TBA
15	"5, 4, 3, Hoo-Ha"	Craig "Sven" Gordon	July 16, 2000	TBA	TBA
16	"Rokken Like Dokken"	Craig "Sven" Gordon	July 23, 2000	TBA	TBA
17	"Donny Who??"	Craig "Sven" Gordon	September 3, 2000	TBA	TBA
18	"Trouble in Townsville"	Craig "Sven" Gordon	September 10, 2000	TBA	TBA
19	"Take Your Chicken to Work"	Craig "Sven" Gordon	September 17, 2000	TBA	TBA
20	"I.R. on Show First"	Craig "Sven" Gordon	September 24, 2000	TBA	TBA
21	"President Scooby"	Craig "Sven" Gordon	October 1, 2000	Nicole, Michelle, Andrea, John	TBA
Scooby-Doo volunteers as the director.
22	"My Girlfriend"	Craig "Sven" Gordon	October 8, 2000	Will, Tyler, Brain	TBA
Johnny imagines if he gets a girlfriend using clay.
23	"Your Mama"	Craig "Sven" Gordon	November 5, 2000	Mama Bravo, Erica, Jacob, Manny	TBA
Johnny gets a call from Mama Bravo, as she hates Johnny's dances.
24	"I'm Glad You Dig It"	Craig "Sven" Gordon	November 12, 2000	Ryan, Tess, Kenny	TBA
Shaggy and Fred from Scooby-Doo volunteer as the directors.
25	"Hour Special"	Craig "Sven" Gordon	December 3, 2000	Tyler, Dan, Blake, Gina, Gianella, Sherrel	TBA
Johnny reminds anyone that they can request a movie, as long as it is chosen from the 10 movies shown in the list. Dexter and Shaggy volunteer as the directors.
26	"JBVO Weekend Marathon"	Craig "Sven" Gordon	December 9, 2000; December 10, 2000	TBA	TBA
Johnny shows different various movies throughout the whole weekend. I.R. Babbon volunteers as the director.
27	"Talkin to The Goldie"	Craig "Sven" Gordon	January 7, 2001	Christian, Chris, Daniel, Wendi, Goldberg	TBA
Johnny shows Goldberg's face a few times.
28	"You Say It I Spray It"	Craig "Sven" Gordon	January 14, 2001	Deanne & Dennis	TBA
Johnny takes another look at people's fanart of him.

== Request appearance from shows ==
- An American Tail: Fievel Goes West - Appears in "Hour Special", from An American Tail
- "Avast Ye Eds" - Appears in "My Girlfriend", from Ed, Edd n Eddy
- "Bikini Space Planet" - Appears in "Talking to the Goldie", from Johnny Bravo
- "Birdman Meets Birdboy" - Appears in "Celebrate Your Mama", from Birdman and the Galaxy Trio
- "Bravo Dooby-Doo - Appears in "I've Been Practicing", from Johnny Bravo
- "Bubblevision" - Appears in "Hour Special", from The Powerpuff Girls
- "Bulldozing the Bull" - Appears in "Extensions", from Popeye, the Sailor
- Bully for Bugs - Appears in "Hour Special", from Dexter's Laboratory
- "Buttercrush" - Appears in "Pilot", from The Powerpuff Girls
- Cock-a-Doodle Dog - Appears in "Mr. Excitement", from MGM
- Cow and Chicken clips - Appears in "I'm The Magic Man", from Cow and Chicken
- "Dawn of the Eds" - Appears in "Is My Hair High Enough?", from Ed, Edd n Eddy
- Deputy Droopy - Appears in "Hour Special", from Droopy
- Designs on Jerry - Appears in "Your Mama", from Tom and Jerry
- Dexter's Rival - Appears in "Another Monkey Dance", from Dexter's Laboratory
- Dexter and Computress Get Mandark! - Appears in "Mr. Excitement", from Dexter's Laboratory
- DiM - Appears in "I'm Glad You Dig It", from Dexter's Laboratory
- "Dinky Jinks" - Appears in "Celebrate Your Mama", from Pixie and Dixie and Mr. Jinks
- Dog Pounded - Appears in "Your Mama"
- "Don't Send in the Clowns" - Appears in "President Scooby", from Cartoon Planet
- Drag-a-Long Droopy - Appears in "Extensions", from Droopy
- Duck Dodgers in the 24½th Century - Appears in "You Say It I Spray It", from Looney Tunes
- Hare-Way to the Stars - Appears in WBVO and "Celebrate Your Mama", from Looney Tunes
- "Journey to the Center of Nowhere" - Appears in "President Scooby", from Courage the Cowardly Dog
- "King Ramses' Curse" - Appears in an unidentified episode, from Courage the Cowardly Dog
- "Mighty Blast of Rage" - Appears in "I've Been Practicing", originally from Dragon Ball Z
- "Mock 5" - Appears in "President Scooby", from Dexter's Laboratory
- "Mom and Jerry" - Appears in "I'm The Magic Man", from Dexter's Laboratory
- "Mr. Mojo's Rising" - Appears in "I'm The Magic Man", from The Powerpuff Girls
- "Orthodontic Police" - Appears in "Your Mama", from Cow and Chicken
- "Pizza Boy: No Tip" - Appears in WBVO, from What a Cartoon!
- Pop 'im Pop! - Appears in "Wait for The Count", from Merrie Melodies
- Popeye clips - Appears in "Pilot", from various Popeye media
- "Queen of the Black Puddle" - Appears in "Wait for the Count", from Courage the Cowardly Dog
- Rabbit of Seville - Appears in "Another Monkey Dance", from Looney Tunes
- Rabbit Punch - Appears in "Talking to the Goldie", from Looney Tunes
- Rhapsody Rabbit - Appears in "I've Been Practicing", from Merrie Melodies
- Robin Hood Daffy - Appears in "Is My Hair High Enough?", from Merrie Melodies
- Robot Randy - Appears in "Hour Special", from Courage the Cowardly Dog
- Scooby-Doo Meets the Boo Brothers - Appears in "JBVO Weekend", from Scooby-Doo
- Scooby-Doo on Zombie Island - Appears in "Hour Special", from Scooby-Doo
- Scrambled Ed - Appears in "I'm Glad You Dig It", from Ed, Edd n Eddy
- Sister's Got a Brand New Bag - Appears in "Talking to the Goldie", from Dexter's Laboratory
- Super Zeroes - Appears in "You Say It I Spray It", from The Powerpuff Girls
- The Jet Cage - Appears in WBVO, from Looney Tunes
- The Loneliest Cow - Appears in "Mr. Excitement", from Cow and Chicken
- The Looney Looney Looney Bugs Bunny Movie - Appears in "JBVO Weekend"
- The Powerpuff Girls clips - Appears in "Is My Hair High Enough?", from The Powerpuff Girls
- The Wacky Wabbit - Appears in "My Girlfriend", from Merrie Melodies
- Tom's Photo Finish - Appears in "Another Monkey Dance", from Tom and Jerry
- Unidentified Bugs Bunny and Yosemite Sam cartoon - Appears in "Hour Special", from Looney Tunes
- Unidentified Daffy Duck cartoon - Appears in an unidentified episode, from Merrie Melodies
- Unidentified Dexter's Laboratory cartoon - Appears in "Hour Special", from Dexter's Laboratory
- Unidentified dinosaur cartoon - Appears in "Hour Special"

== Production ==
JBVO was animated using a beta version of Kaydara's FilmBox On-Air software. A selection of animation clips were sequenced together and triggered by an operator based on the conversations Johnny was having with live callers.

== Future broadcasts after January 2001 ==
Although the show continued to air reruns until August 2001, new segments were no longer being produced by early 2001. Instead, Cartoon Network would edit previous episodes to remove any mentions of their original airdate.

== Spinoffs ==
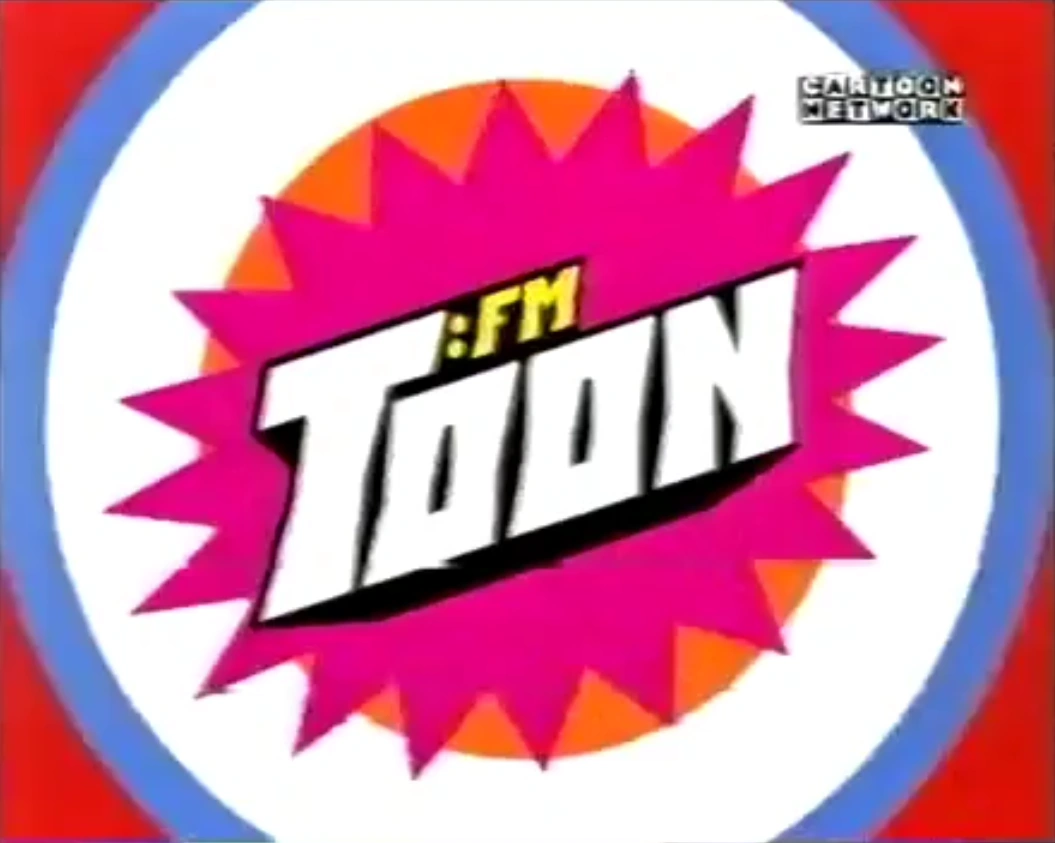
The show's logo for its first season.

=== Toon:FM ===
Toon:FM (or ToonFM) was a morning programming block that aired on the Cartoon Network United Kingdom channel and throughout Europe. The show is hosted by Johnny Bravo with Space Ghost character Brak. It is unknown when the show aired and ended, however, a "he-mail" Johnny answered on The Big Bravo page of the CN UK website implies the show was already airing by June 2001, or perhaps on hiatus. It is also unknown if the show was connected to the radio station by the same name as the station was launched in October 1999. In October 2001, the sequel was greenlit to a second season to the show being hosted in Tokyo, Japan, called Toon FM: Live From Tokyo. Johnny is voiced by Marc Silk in this version.

=== Viva Las Bravo ===
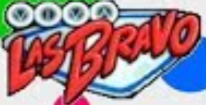

Another sequel named Viva Las Bravo was aired from 2005 to 2006 on summer afternoons, on Cartoon Network EMEA and CEE. Every day, Johnny would announce three cartoons, and the one getting the highest votes via email or on CartoonNetworkHQ.net would be shown for two hours the next day. He would also constantly appear in commercial breaks, cracking jokes or answering humorous emails and phone calls.

== Rumored merchandise ==
There was also a version filed for clothing use. 'JBVO' was once used in the URL for the Johnny Bravo section of the online Cartoon Network Shop, however no merchandise made for the spin-off itself is known to exist. This trademark was also abandoned in June 2003.

== See also ==
- The Moxy Show - a similar series to JBVO
- Space Ghost Coast to Coast - the first TV series produced by Cartoon Network, the first Cartoon Network series as a pre-Adult Swim show; similarly used an animated host.
- Johnny Bravo - prequel to JBVO
