= Keeping Up with =

- Keeping up with the Bigheads / Skid Marks
- Keeping up with the Eds
- Keeping up with the Joneses (disambiguation)
- Keeping Up with the Johnsons
- Keeping Up With Our Joneses
- Keeping Up with the Kalashnikovs
- Keeping Up with the Kandasamys
- Keeping Up with the Kardashians
- Keeping Up with Lizzie
- Keeping Up with the Steins
