= The Ed-touchables and Nagged to Ed =

"The Ed-touchables" and "Nagged to Ed"
- Ed, Edd n Eddy episode
- Episode no.: Season 1 Episode 2
- Directed by: Danny Antonucci
- Written by: Danny Antonucci; Jono Howard; Mike Kubat (uncredited)
- Original air date: January 4, 1999
- Running time: 22 minutes (11 minutes each)

Episode chronology
← Previous "Pop Goes the Ed / Over Your Ed"	Next → "Sir Ed-a-Lot / A Pinch to Grow an Ed"
- Ed, Edd n Eddy season 1

"The Ed-touchables" and "Nagged to Ed" are the two segments of the series premiere of the animated television series Ed, Edd n Eddy. It premiered on Cartoon Network in the United States on January 4, 1999, although it had originally been scheduled to air on November 7, 1998.

The series follows Ed (voiced by Matt Hill), Edd (called "Double D" and voiced by Sam Vincent), and Eddy (voiced by Tony Sampson), three adolescent boys collectively known as "the Eds" and unofficially led by Eddy, who live in a suburban cul-de-sac. During "The Ed-touchables", the trio tries to earn money by hunting down the "serial toucher", who has been stealing the cul-de-sac children's belongings. "Nagged to Ed" chronicles the Eds' first encounter with the obsessive Kanker Sisters, after they lure the Eds' into their trailer park home.

Series creator Danny Antonucci directed both episodes, co-writing "The Ed-touchables" with Jono Howard and "Nagged to Ed" with Howard and Mike Kubat. The score was composed by Patric Caird, who went on to compose the scores for all of the series' episodes. Although Ed, Edd n Eddy was one of Cartoon Network's top-rated shows ever since its premiere and was largely well received, its pilot was met with mixed reviews. The episodes can be bought as part of various season home media releases.

== Plot ==
=== "The Ed-touchables" ===
While organizing his room, Edd (called "Double D" and voiced by Sam Vincent) notices that his magnifying glass is missing. Convinced that it was stolen, he begins to have a panic attack but is calmed down by Eddy (voiced by Tony Sampson). The two then go to Ed's (voiced by Matt Hill) house. Not long after they arrive, Ed's younger sister Sarah (voiced by Janyse Jaud) comes barging into his room, accusing him of stealing her doll. Ed denies having done so, and Eddy concludes that there is a "serial toucher" on the loose. The Eds spread the word to the other cul-de-sac children, who offer them money if they catch the thief.

The three then form a plan, which has Ed sitting alone on a bench in the playground with a "Don't Touch!" sign around his neck. Jonny (voiced by David Paul Grove) soon walks by, carrying his imaginary friend Plank, who is a board of wood. Impressed with Ed's hair cut, Jonny ignores the sign and rubs Plank against Ed's head. Eddy and Double D then jump out from behind a nearby bush and capture Jonny, accusing him of being the serial toucher. Eddy interrogates Jonny and Plank after tying them to chairs in Double D's garage and hooking them up to a homemade lie detector. However, when they give him no answers, he loses his patience and resorts to using Chinese water torture on Plank, which will eventually cause Plank to inflate. This makes Jonny need to use the bathroom urgently and in his desperation, he falsely confesses to the crime. The Eds then collect their money and Jonny is punished by being trapped in a tire.

While on their way to buy jawbreakers at the candy store, the Eds are stopped by Sarah who claims to have found her doll under her bed. Double D then confesses that he recently found his magnifying glass as well, proving that there never actually was a serial toucher and Jonny was innocent the entire time. Despite this revelation, the Eds still decide to spend the money, without freeing Jonny. However, while they are enjoying their jawbreakers, Sarah rolls the tire in which Jonny is trapped down a hill, knocking the three over. The jawbreakers fly out of their mouths and roll down the street, leaving the Eds to chase after them.

=== "Nagged to Ed" ===
Setting out on Double D's monthly insect expedition, the Eds venture into a forest. While Double D admires the bounty of nature, Eddy discovers a giant spiderweb and fearfully suggests that they leave. His friends are intrigued by its enormous size however, and Ed starts bouncing on the web. Suddenly, nearby voices start chanting the Eds' names. Double D and Eddy urge Ed to climb down from the web, but he is unable to break free on his own. After his friends manage to pull him down, the three of them frantically try to run away. Before they are able to escape the forest though, they fall into a muddy swamp and are surrounded by three seemingly ominous figures.

Some time later, the Eds wake up in a trailer home, where three girls are staring down at them. The boys have already been changed out of their dirty clothes and put into clean robes, which the girls inform them each belong to one of their three respective dads. Explaining that they are new to the area, the girls introduce themselves as Lee (voiced by Janyse Jaud), Marie (voiced by Kathleen Barr), and May Kanker (voiced by Erin Fitzgerald). The Eds begin to offer their own introductions, but are stopped short by the sisters who are already familiar with the boys' names. As the Kankers head into the kitchen to prepare food for the Eds, Double D anxiously proposes that the three of them leave. However, Eddy stops him, insisting that they stay at least for the free food. Looking around, the boys notice drawings of themselves, each paired with one of the Kankers: Ed with May, Double D with Marie, and Eddy with Lee. Although left unsettled by this discovery, they eagerly accept the food that is brought out to them and begin to relax, as the Kankers slip a movie into the VCR and go upstairs to freshen up.

When the Kankers return, they make multiple attempts to garner the Eds' attention, but the boys, engrossed with what they are watching on the TV, ignore them. Angry, and feeling unappreciated, the Kankers start bossing the Eds around, forcing them to clean up the house. Eddy quickly grows annoyed with the situation though, and loses his temper with the Kankers, sending them crying into their room. In a moment of regret, he attempts to apologize, but is told by May to leave and to never return. The Eds gladly accept this, but upon opening the front door, they find the Kankers blocking their way, holding self-made dolls styled to look like the Eds. Dubbing the dolls "Eddy Junior", "Ed Junior" and "Double D Junior", the Kankers try to guilt the Eds into staying. However, this only causes the boys to flee in terror. The Kankers look after the Eds longingly as they go and declare their love for them.

== Production and release ==
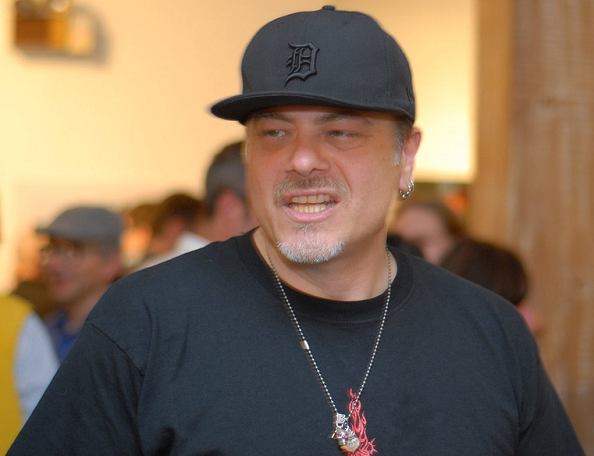
Ed, Edd n Eddy creator Danny Antonucci directed and co-wrote the pilot.

As a veteran Hanna-Barbera animator, Canadian cartoonist Danny Antonucci was bothered by the idea that animation was only for children, prompting him to produce edgy adult works such as Lupo the Butcher and The Brothers Grunt. Antonucci was later dared to produce a children's cartoon and accepted the challenge. Antonucci drew the Eds while designing a commercial. After spending months designing the show, he then faxed a one-page concept sheet to Cartoon Network and Nickelodeon in 1996. Both responded quickly with high interest but Nickelodeon demanded creative control, to which Antonucci refused. After Cartoon Network agreed to let Antonucci have creative control, a deal was made that his studio, a.k.a. Cartoon, would produce the series. Entering production in 1997, Ed, Edd n Eddy became Cartoon Network's first original production by a company other than Hanna-Barbera, as well as the first to bypass a seven-minute short.

An advocate of hand-drawn animation, Antonucci wanted Ed, Edd n Eddy's animation to be akin to cartoons from the 1940s to the 1970s. Being the last series to use cel animation, a.k.a. Cartoon shipped cels to Korea for initial animation. After arriving from Korea, animators ran the negatives through digital noise reduction (DVNR), a technology used to digitally clean up dirt and grain as film is transferred to tape. Antonucci referred to this as "a necessary evil" because it damaged the animation. Upon seeing the harmful effects on the pilot, he minimized DVNR to purify colors and avoid affecting the image as much as possible.

Directed by Antonucci, the episodes were co-written by Jono Howard and Mike Kubat. Both episodes were storyboarded by Scott Underwood, Leah Waldron, James Wootton and Bill Zeats. The score was composed by Patric Caird, who went on to compose the music for the rest of the series. Due to minor post-production delays, the series premiere, first scheduled for November 7, 1998, was delayed until November 16 before finally airing on January 4, 1999. The pilot was released as part of Ed, Edd n Eddy: The Complete First Season DVD on October 10, 2006, which can be purchased on Amazon.com and the Cartoon Network Shop. It is also available for purchase on the iTunes Store, where it can be bought separately, or as a part of season 1.

== Reception ==
Ed, Edd n Eddy was one of Cartoon Network's top-rated shows ever since its premiere, particularly with boys. While Ed, Edd n Eddy went on to garner largely positive reviews, the pilot was met with mixed reactions. Some reviewers were unenthusiastic about the episode. The Hollywood Reporter said the animation was "primitive" and "simplistic" and could "only be described as ugly." He further criticized the characters as "grim and toothy" and the voice work as "glowering". The Times-Picayune wrote: "the funniest thing about Ed, Edd and Eddy is the title." Terrence Briggs of Animation World Magazine wrote a scathing review, considering Ed, Edd n Eddy the worst Cartoon Network show up to that point and criticising the episodes as "empty adventures" of pure "filler" with characters that were "products from the school of acid-trip caricature".

However, other reviews were positive. After Briggs' review was published, a large number of letters supportive of the show were sent to the magazine, prompting it to "take a second look" at the show, with Matt Shumway and Lamont Wayne writing a much more positive review, calling it "a fresh show with very different approaches". The Sarasota Herald-Tribune was highly positive of the show and felt that the show's lively animation and slapstick humor recalled "the delight of earlier cartoon era", writing: "In times of old, cartoon characters had eyes that bugged out when they drank something unpleasant, legs that became whirling circles when they ran and bodies that flattened into pancakes when they crashed into slammed doors. Well, they're ba-a-a-ck." The Herald Sun considered Ed, Edd n Eddy an animated mixture of well-known classic TV shows, noting "just imagine Dexter in his laboratory working on some new project for the Cartoon Network when he tunes into The Little Rascals and The Three Stooges. Alfalfa, Spanky, Moe, and Curly really excite the wunderkind who decides to extract some DNA from the old TV legends. Into the test tubes with the DNA ... add a little animation and Dexter has Ed, Edd N Eddy".
