= Mr. Jones =

Mr. Jones may refer to:

== Music ==
- Mr. Jones (Tom Jones album), 2002
- Mr. Jones (Elvin Jones album), 1972
- "Mr. Jones" (Counting Crows song), 1993
- "Mr. Jones" (Mike Jones song), 2006
- "Mr. Jones" (Pop Smoke song), 2021
- "Mr. Jones", a song by The Mavericks from From Hell to Paradise, 1992
- "Mr. Jones", a song by NOFX from Liberal Animation, 1988
- "Mr. Jones", a song by The Psychedelic Furs from Talk Talk Talk, 1981
- "Mr. Jones", a song by Talking Heads from Naked, 1988
- "Mr. Jones", a song by country artist Big Al Downing, 1978
- Mr. Jones, a character in Bob Dylan's song "Ballad of a Thin Man", 1965
- Mr. Jones, a character in the Bee Gees' song "New York Mining Disaster 1941", 1967

== Other media ==
- Mr. Jones (1993 film), a drama starring Richard Gere, Lena Olin and Anne Bancroft
- Mr. Jones (2013 film), a horror thriller film by Karl Mueller
- Mr Jones (2019 film), a biographical thriller film directed by Agnieszka Holland
- Mr. Jones, a fictional character in the James Bond film Dr. No
- Mr. Jones (Animal Farm), a fictional character in George Orwell's novel Animal Farm
- Mr. Jones, a fictional character in the video game Rage of the Dragons
- Mr. Jones, a fictional character in the TV series Zig and Zag

== See also ==
- List of people with surname Jones
- Jones (surname), a popular family name of British origins
- Jones (disambiguation)
- Mrs. Jones (disambiguation), including Miss Jones, Ms Jones
- "Hey Mr. Jones", a song by Jane Child from Jane Child
