= Ed, Edd n Eddy season 2 =

Second season of animated television series Ed, Edd n Eddy

Ed, Edd n Eddy
- Season 2
- DVD cover
- No. of episodes: 13 (26 segments)

Release
- Original network: Cartoon Network
- Original release: November 26, 1999 – December 22, 2000

Season chronology
- ← Previous; Season 1 Next → Season 3

The second season of the animated comedy television series Ed, Edd n Eddy, created by Danny Antonucci, originally aired on Cartoon Network from November 26, 1999, to December 22, 2000, and consists of 13 episodes. The series revolves around three adolescent boys collectively known as "the Eds", who live in a suburban cul-de-sac. Unofficially led by Eddy, the Eds frequently scheme to make money off their peers in order to purchase their favorite confection, jawbreakers. However, their plans usually fail, leaving them in various predicaments.

The first season was a success in Nielsen ratings, prompting Cartoon Network for a November 1999 premiere. While the first season itself received generally positive reviews, the second season proved to be an improvement in reception, garnering acclaim and earning two Leo Awards, while the first received one.

The Complete Second Season DVD was released in Region 1 in 2007. The Ed, Edd n Eddy DVD volume Edifying Ed-Ventures, also featured season two episodes. Both DVDs were published by Warner Home Video. Many Cartoon Network compilation DVDs featured episodes from the season. It can also be purchased from the iTunes Store. It was written by Antonucci, Jono Howard, Mike Kubat, and Robert Leighton.

== Development ==
=== Concept ===
Ed, Edd n Eddy follows the lives of three adolescent boys who all share variations of the name Ed, but differ greatly in their personalities. In the pursuit of buying jawbreakers and fitting in with the other kids, dimwitted Ed and intellectual Double Dee aid the self-appointed leader, Eddy, in his plans to scam the other children in their cul-de-sac out of their money during a perpetual summer vacation; however problems always ensue. The other children mostly dislike or show indifference to the Eds, though they all share a common fear of the Kanker Sisters, a group of teenage girls who live in the nearby "Park n' Flush" trailer park. The series takes place mostly within the fictional town of Peach Creek, and new locations were rarely introduced.

=== Production and cast ===
Danny Antonucci, a cartoonist known for his edgy adult work such as Lupo the Butcher and The Brothers Grunt, was dared by someone to produce a children's cartoon. In 1996, Antonucci pitched Ed, Edd n Eddy, which he conceived while designing a commercial, to Cartoon Network and Nickelodeon. After Cartoon Network agreed to give Antonucci creative control over the show, the series went into production and premiered its first season on January 4, 1999.

According to Cartoon Network executive Linda Simensky, the first season did "remarkably well" in ratings ever since its premiere, becoming one of the top-rated series on the network and prompting Cartoon Network to quickly order a second season for a November 1999 premiere, making it one of four seasons which Ed, Edd n Eddy was set to run. Antonucci stated that change in the characters from the first to the second season is "very" noticeable, due to the amount of development they went through. Antonucci directed the season, and co-wrote the episodes with Jono Howard and Mike Kubat, although Robert Leighton was credited as a co-writer for "To Sir with Ed".

The cast mostly remained the same as in season one; Matt Hill, Samuel Vincent, and Tony Sampson were cast as Ed, Edd (Double D), and Eddy, David Paul Grove as Jonny 2x4, Keenan Christenson as Jimmy, Janyse Jaud as Sarah and Lee Kanker, Kathleen Barr as Kevin and Marie, Peter Kelamis as Rolf, and Erin Fitzgerald as May Kanker, but Tabitha St. Germain, the voice of Nazz, was replaced by Fitzgerald.

== Reception ==
=== Reviews and accolades ===
The second season of Ed, Edd n Eddy was generally acclaimed by critics and marked an improvement in reception from the first season. In 2000, the season won Danny Antonucci the Leo Award for Best Director of an Animated Production. In 2001, Patric Caird was nominated for the Leo Award for Best Musical Score of an Animation Program or Series, for his work on the episode "Ed in a Halfshell".

In his review of The Complete Second Season DVD, David Cornelius of DVD Talk considered the Eds adolescent equivalents of The Three Stooges, believing: "The series revels in the sort of frantic, often gross humor kids love so much, and there's just enough oddball insanity at play to make adults giggle just as easily." Cornelius also concurred that the "animation is colorful and intentionally bizarre; bold lines forming the characters and backgrounds wiggle and morph in a delirious haze. This is animation that's, well, really animated."

=== Home media ===
Two Ed, Edd n Eddy DVDs which featured a number of season 2 episodes were released by Warner Home Video in Region 1 from 2005 to 2007. The DVD volume titled Edifying Ed-Ventures was released on May 10, 2005, featuring three season two episodes out of a total six. The Complete Second Season was released on April 24, 2007. Both DVDs can also be purchased on the Cartoon Network Shop. The season is also available for download on the iTunes Store. Selected episodes from the season were also featured on several Cartoon Network compilation DVDs.

== Episodes ==
No. overall	No. in season	Title	Directed by	Written by	Storyboard by	Original release date	Prod. code
14	1	"Know It All Ed"	Danny Antonucci	Jono Howard & Danny Antonucci	"Big" Jim Miller & Jason Surridge	November 26, 1999	201
14	1	"Dear Ed"	Danny Antonucci	Jono Howard & Danny Antonucci	James "Wootie" Wootton & Joel Dickie	November 26, 1999	201
"Know It All Ed" – When the Eds find turkey basters at the junkyard, they develop a scam using the basters as squirt guns, only for the Kanker Sisters to take them to a showdown.; "Dear Ed" – After the Eds find Jimmy with Plank due to a feud between him and Jonny, they make new friends for Jonny at a cost.
15	2	"Knock Knock Who's Ed?"	Danny Antonucci	Jono Howard & Danny Antonucci	Leah Waldron & Rob Boutilier	February 11, 2000	202
15	2	"One + One = Ed"	Danny Antonucci	Jono Howard & Danny Antonucci	Scott "Diggs" Underwood & Pat Pakula	February 11, 2000	202
"Knock Knock Who's Ed?" – The Eds try to watch a monster movie marathon at other kids' houses after Sarah locks them out of her and Ed's house.; "One + One = Ed" – The Eds decide to learn what things are made of by taking them apart. Their imaginations take over and reality is bent in a surrealistic manner.; Note – According to its copyright date, this episode was completed sometime in December 1999.
16	3	"Eeny, Meeny, Miney, Ed"	Danny Antonucci	Jono Howard & Danny Antonucci	"Big" Jim Miller & Jason Surridge	March 3, 2000	203
16	3	"Ready, Set...Ed!"	Danny Antonucci	Jono Howard & Danny Antonucci	Scott "Diggs" Underwood & Pat Pakula	March 3, 2000	203
"Eeny, Meeny, Miney, Ed" – When Eddy tells Ed that Edd is not human since he is so smart, the Eds get invited to a barbecue at Nazz's place and Ed thinks it is a ceremony to transform kids into bugs.; "Ready, Set...Ed!" – Jealous of Kevin's record-breaking, Eddy decides to show off his own skills and tells the kids that the Eds just broke a world record for flying around the world. Eddy gives them a ride in his fake "rocket car", and manages to convince them that they are riding around the world, until Kevin realizes the truth.; Note – According to its copyright date, this episode was completed sometime in December 1999.
17	4	"Hands Across Ed"	Danny Antonucci	Jono Howard & Danny Antonucci	Leah Waldron & Rob Boutilier	March 24, 2000	204
17	4	"Floss Your Ed"	Danny Antonucci	Jono Howard & Danny Antonucci	Timothy Packford & Scott "Diggs" Underwood	March 24, 2000	204
"Hands Across Ed" – Eddy has the idea for his next scam: Holding a telethon to raise money. They claim that Ed's eyebrow is beginning to spread all over his body, and they need money for the operation.; "Floss Your Ed" – Ed gets a toothache after biting a coconut and, after an inspection, Edd says he is losing his last baby tooth. Eddy tries to get it out to receive money from the tooth fairy.
18	5	"In Like Ed"	Danny Antonucci	Jono Howard & Danny Antonucci	"Big" Jim Miller & Jason Surridge	April 7, 2000	205
18	5	"Who Let the Ed In?"	Danny Antonucci	Jono Howard, Mike Kubat, & Danny Antonucci	Mauro Casalese & Scott "Diggs" Underwood	April 7, 2000	205
"In Like Ed" – The Eds think that Kevin "knows too much" and try to find out where he gets his information from by crashing Jimmy's birthday party.; "Who Let the Ed In?" – Ed gets an imaginary friend named Jib.
19	6	"Homecooked Eds"	Danny Antonucci	Mike Kubat & Danny Antonucci	Tout Le Monde	May 12, 2000	206
19	6	"Rambling Ed"	Danny Antonucci	Jono Howard & Danny Antonucci	James "Wootie" Wootton & Scott "Diggs" Underwood	May 12, 2000	206
"Homecooked Eds" – The Kankers take a vacation on Eddy's lawn and Eddy tries to get rid of them.; "Rambling Ed" – To get away from Sarah, Ed moves into Rolf's barn, testing the latter's hospitality.
20	7	"To Sir with Ed"	Danny Antonucci	Robert Leighton, Jono Howard, & Danny Antonucci	"Big" Jim Miller, Scott "Diggs" Underwood, & Rob Boutilier	June 23, 2000	207
20	7	"Key to My Ed"	Danny Antonucci	Jono Howard, Mike Kubat, & Danny Antonucci	Rob Boutilier & Joel Dickie	June 23, 2000	207
"To Sir with Ed" – Nazz babysits Eddy while his parents are out, the latter mistaking it for a date with her, both flattering and terrifying Eddy in the process.; "Key to My Ed" – The Eds find a key and try to discover what it unlocks.
21	8	"Urban Ed"	Danny Antonucci	Jono Howard & Danny Antonucci	Leah Waldron & Timothy Packford	July 21, 2000	208
21	8	"Stop, Look and Ed"	Danny Antonucci	Jono Howard & Danny Antonucci	Timothy Packford, Leah Waldron, & Scott "Diggs" Underwood	July 21, 2000	208
"Urban Ed" – Getting bored with suburban life, the Eds create a city of their own.; "Stop, Look and Ed" – Eddy convinces the rest of the kids to break rules, much to Edd's horror.
22	9	"Honor Thy Ed"	Danny Antonucci	Mike Kubat & Danny Antonucci	Joel Dickie & James "Wootie" Wootton	August 4, 2000	209
22	9	"Scrambled Ed"	Danny Antonucci	Mike Kubat & Danny Antonucci	"Big" Jim Miller, Rob Boutilier, & Scott "Diggs" Underwood	August 4, 2000	209
"Honor Thy Ed" – The Eds investigate an abandoned house as a bet Eddy makes with Kevin, trapping themselves in the process for marrying the Kanker Sisters.; ———-: This the last episode to have a voice of Erin Fitzgerald as May until she returns to Season 4.; "Scrambled Ed" – After pulling an all-nighter working on a project, Edd tries to sleep, but is constantly interrupted by Eddy and the others.
23	10	"Rent-an-Ed"	Danny Antonucci	Jono Howard & Danny Antonucci	James "Wootie" Wootton & Joel Dickie	August 18, 2000	210
23	10	"Shoo Ed"	Danny Antonucci	Mike Kubat & Danny Antonucci	"Big" Jim Miller	August 18, 2000	210
"Rent-a-Ed" – After another failed scam for a circus, the Eds start a repair business, only for Ed to destroy everything they fix.; "Shoo Ed" – The Eds turn Jonny into a pest and charge kids to get rid of him.
24	11	"Ed in a Halfshell"	Danny Antonucci	Jono Howard & Danny Antonucci	Rob Boutilier	September 8, 2000	211
24	11	"Mirror, Mirror, on the Ed"	Danny Antonucci	Jono Howard & Danny Antonucci	Scott "Diggs" Underwood, Rob Boutilier, & "Big" Jim Miller	September 8, 2000	211
"Ed in a Halfshell" – While Sarah is at a ballet lesson, Ed and Jimmy bond, causing Eddy to make Jimmy a scammer like him. However, Jimmy refuses to share the money he made on his own.; "Mirror, Mirror, on the Ed" – The Eds act like each other as part of a game of Truth or Dare.
25	12	"Hot Buttered Ed"	Danny Antonucci	Jono Howard & Danny Antonucci	Leah Waldron	October 27, 2000	212
25	12	"High Heeled Ed"	Danny Antonucci	Jono Howard & Danny Antonucci	Leah Waldron & Timothy Packford	October 27, 2000	212
"Hot Buttered Ed" – When Kevin steals the Eds' spot at the creek on a particular hot day, they try to find another one.; "High Heeled Ed" – After discovering all of the boys (except Jimmy) went go-karting, the Eds try to scam Nazz, Sarah, and Jimmy.
26	13	"Fa-La-La-La-Ed"	Danny Antonucci	Jono Howard & Danny Antonucci	James "Wootie" Wootton & Joel Dickie	December 22, 2000	213
26	13	"Cry Ed"	Danny Antonucci	Jono Howard, Mike Kubat, & Danny Antonucci	Tout Le Monde	December 22, 2000	213
"Fa-La-La-La-Ed" – After hearing Edd talking about his family's Christmas fruitcake, Ed believes that Christmas has arrived, not caring about the fact that it is actually July. The Eds then try to bring the holiday spirit to the other kids. Eddy tries to sing Christmas carols for money, but Ed gives away all their jawbreakers.; "Cry Ed" – After a clothespin hits Jimmy's foot, Eddy fakes various injuries to divert attention away from Jimmy, but Sarah is not buying it.; ———-: Note – This the last episode to have a voice of Erin Fitzgerald as Nazz until she returns to Season 4.

== Home media ==
Ed, Edd n Eddy: The Complete Second Season
Set details	Special features
13 episodes; 295 minutes; 2-disc set; 1.33:1 aspect ratio; Subtitles: English, Spanish, French; Dubbed: French, Spanish; English (Dolby Digital Stereo)	"Behind the Eds with Danny Antonucci"; "The Incredible Shrinking Day" music video; "Ed's Origami"; "The Good, the Bad, and the Ugly"; "How to Draw Ed"
Release dates
Region 1
April 24, 2007
