= The Moxy Show =

American animated anthology television series

- Genre: Anthology
- Written by: The Moxy Show: Scott Sedita; Jonathan Groff; Tim Boxell; Bobcat Goldthwait; Penn Jillette; Matt Maiellaro (Note: The Moxy & Flea Show); Matt Harrigan
- Directed by: George Evelyn; Tim Boxell; Greg Harrison
- Voices of: Bobcat Goldthwait; Penn Jillette; Chris Rock
- Opening theme: "De La Funk" by René De Wael
- Composer: David Wayne Powers
- Country of origin: United States
- Original language: English

Production
- Executive producers: Betty Cohen; Joshua Katz; Mike Lazzo; Keith Crofford
- Producers: Margo de la Cruz; Tammy Walters
- Editor: Lili Cunningham
- Running time: 60 minutes (Note: The Moxy Pirate Show); 30 minutes
- Production companies: Cartoon Network Productions; Colossal Pictures; Turner Studios

Original release
- Network: Cartoon Network
- Release: December 5, 1993 – May 25, 1996

The Moxy Show, also known as The Moxy Pirate Show and The Moxy & Flea Show, (Note: The Moxy Show has gone by three names throughout its airing. The series was titled The Moxy Pirate Show when it first premiered on December 5, 1993; was renamed The Moxy Show upon the introduction of Flea on November 6, 1994; and was briefly known as The Moxy & Flea Show for one episode on December 25, 1995.) is an American animated anthology television series produced by Colossal Pictures for Cartoon Network. It consists of classic cartoons inter-spliced with segments featuring commentary from an anthropomorphic dog named Moxy, who purportedly works for Cartoon Network as a janitor but secretly hijacks their signal every Sunday.

The Moxy Show was Cartoon Network's first exclusive original programming and was created out of Cartoon Network's desire for an animated host that could be aired live. They contracted Colossal Pictures to develop the character and the motion capture technology to realize Cartoon Network's vision. Moxy was voiced by Bobcat Goldthwait, while Colossal Pictures' software used John Stevenson as an actor for Moxy's movements. The series first aired as The Moxy Pirate Show on December 5, 1993, before being rebranded as The Moxy Show on November 6, 1994, alongside the introduction of a new character named Flea, who serves as Moxy's sidekick. The series run ended on May 25, 1996, and is currently unavailable.

== Premise ==
Moxy (voiced by Bobcat Goldthwait) is an anthropomorphic dog who purportedly works as a janitor for Cartoon Network and was unsuccessful in being granted his own show. Moxy has built a bootleg studio in his closet where he hijacks the signal to Cartoon Network every week to host The Moxy Show. On The Moxy Show, Moxy showcases classic cartoons such as Looney Tunes, Tom and Jerry and Popeye. Between each cartoon, Moxy provides commentary and trivia.

When the show rebranded as The Moxy Show, a sidekick named Flea (voiced by Penn Jillette, and later by Chris Rock) was introduced, who is described as a "professional pest". Moxy and Flea serve as a dynamic duo, in which Moxy is careless while Flea is level-headed.

During the show's initial iteration as The Moxy Pirate Show, Moxy was the only character. Sometimes when Moxie is hosting, the "Boss Alert" screen will go off where his partially-unseen live-action boss (portrayed by an uncredited actor) would bark orders at him to get something done or scold him and Flea for something for what they have done wrong.

== Production ==
Cartoon Network is a cable television channel focused on animation, created by Turner Broadcasting System, and launched on October 1, 1992. Cartoon Network's initial programming relied on reruns of classic television cartoons. Cartoon Network wanted to create both a mascot that would perform animated skits in between airings and a live host for special events. "The problem arose," according to Cartoon Network president Betty Cohen, "when [they] realized that for the Cartoon Network, [they] were going to need a cartoon host." Traditional animation and computer animation could not be produced and aired live and thus could not be used for Cartoon Network's desired animated host. Cartoon Network approached Colossal Pictures, a company that had been merging traditional animation with new "real-time applications in new media". Brian DeGraff of Colossal Pictures proposed Moxy as Cartoon Network's mascot. Moxy would be computer-modeled in 3D and use motion capture for animation as the series. Approving this idea, Cartoon Network contracted Colossal Pictures to produce sixteen interstitial animations. Cartoon Network chose to work with Colossal Pictures due to their innovation and experience in animation and character development.

Moxy went through many design variations before Colossal Pictures settled on his final design. Despite being 3D, Moxy's design was meant to emulate other cartoons by having jointless limbs and skewed facial features. Though DeGraff wanted to model Moxy's closet studio through computer graphics, budgetary constraints forced Colossal Pictures to overlay Moxy over a live-action set and to restrict the recording setup to three cameras, limiting the number of fixed perspectives accordingly. As part of the creators' attempts at imitating other cartoons, the set purported used "cartoon logic" such as the closet consisting of shelves with the heaviest objects on the upper shelves. In addition, The miniature set was intentionally given a "wanky" appearance to convey Moxy's unpreparedness and improvisatory nature and was built in forced perspective, "giving it the illusion of depth".

The motion capture software used for Moxy was developed in-house. Goldthwait was hired to voice Moxy, and John Stevenson was hired as the motion capture actor. Moxy's lip-syncing was automatic, being determined by the loudness of Goldthwait's voice. For Moxy's movements, Stevenson wore a magnetic harness with sensors for motion capture, along with a hard hat with a long beak and cardboard hands with sensors to compensate for Moxy's large ears and hands. Moxy's limb movements were intentionally distorted by the software to give Moxy a "rubbery" feel. The software also gave Moxy procedurally animated details independent of the motion capture such as wiggling ears to eliminate stiffness. Additional animated details were also added post-recording such as his eyes squinting and his eyebrows raising.

== Broadcast and reception ==
Moxy was first showcased at a Manhattan news conference on September 28, 1993. Marketed as the "first real-time cartoon character", Moxy later debuted publicly as the host of The Great International Toon-In, a 14-hour animated program run by Turner Broadcasting System. It was broadcast on November 26, 1993, spanning six Turner Entertainment cable networks including Cartoon Network, TBS, and TNT. The Moxy Pirate Show first aired on December 5, 1993, as Cartoon Network's first exclusive original programming, with subsequent episodes airing every Sunday night in an hour-long format. On November 6, 1994, with the introduction of Flea, the show was rebranded as The Moxy Show and changed to a half-hour format. One episode was broadcast under the moniker The Moxy & Flea Show, which aired on December 25, 1995. The Moxy Show last aired on May 25, 1996. The Moxy Show has never aired since or been released for purchase.

The critical and audience reception of The Moxy Show was generally poor. A week after The Moxy Pirate Show's premiere, Lee Winfrey of The Philadelphia Inquirer called Moxy, "The most overhyped and disappointing new cable television host this fall". Winfrey considered Moxy's character to be without wit or distinction and believed that the creators' focus on motion capture led to them neglecting to make Moxy interesting. In a 2003 interview with Andy Merrill, Merrill speculated that the series did not "click" for audiences, noting its low quality to have led to an incredibly poor reputation within Cartoon Network and lack of acknowledgement, despite enjoying his work on the series. Retrospectively, Screen Rant ranked The Moxy Show as the tenth best Cartoon Network show of the 1990s, beating out Big Bag and Mike, Lu & Og. Amanda Bruce and Rosie Mulley of Screen Rant wrote that since The Moxy Show's poor reception and short-lived airing, Cartoon Network has "learned from their mistakes and created more successful and popular original characters from then out."

== See also ==
- Space Ghost Coast to Coast – similarly used an animated host
- JBVO – similarly used an animated host

== Sources ==
- Baker, Christopher W. (1994). How Did They Do It? Computer Illusion in Film and TV. Alpha Books. ISBN 978-1-567-61422-0.
- "The Making of Moxy". Just Yabba Dabba Doo It. 1993. Cartoon Network.
