= Yam Roll =

- Also known as: The Very Good Adventures of Yam Roll in Happy Kingdom
- Genre: Comedy
- Created by: Jono Howard; Jon Izen
- Directed by: Jon Izen
- Starring: Lee Tockar; Joe Pingue; Sunday Muse; Dwayne Hill; Carlos Díaz; Robert Smith; Gary Krawford
- Country of origin: Canada
- No. of seasons: 1
- No. of episodes: 39

Production
- Executive producers: Daniel Hawes; Catherine Tait; Liliana Vogt
- Producer: Daniel Hawes
- Editor: Jono Howard
- Running time: 10–11 minutes
- Production company: March Entertainment

Original release
- Network: CBC
- Release: February 6 – December 23, 2006

Yam Roll (or the long title, The Very Good Adventures of Yam Roll in Happy Kingdom) is a Canadian animated television series created by Jono Howard and Jon Izen for CBC Television. Produced by March Entertainment, the series premiered on February 6, 2006, airing on Saturdays at 10:00am and 10:17am on local CBC channels.

== Premise ==
Yam Roll features a cast of animated sushi characters, and other anthropomorphic instances of Japanese cuisine, all living in Happy Kingdom, a prosperous city which is upset quite often by monsters.

Quoting from March Entertainment's site:

Yam Roll tells the story of an exotic land of sushi and how one of its inhabitants, a super-powered cab driver named Yam Roll, braves monsters and bad guys all in the name of unrequited love. Despite being well liked in Happy Kingdom due to his good nature and sweet, root-vegetable flavouring, Yam Roll is still a frustrated guy. Why? Because he is hopelessly in love with the town sweetheart, a spicy tuna roll named Minamiko.

Yam Roll's associates include his helpful and wise Zen master, Katcho Miso (an old lump of salty bean paste), his sidekick and best friend Ebi-san (a severely hyperactive shrimp), and the rest of his motley maritime crew.

== Characters ==
- Yam Roll (voiced by Lee Tockar: A taxicab driver by profession who wears a cowboy hat and boots. He is portrayed as an orange yam wrapped in rice, his body being circular in appearance, with stick-like arms and legs. Yam Roll is bestowed with a certain degree of super powers thanks to his instructor Katcho and the powers of Mount Foopi. These powers allow him to fly, lift incredibly heavy objects, and change form (into a door, a table, a potato masher, etc.). But despite his powers, Yam Roll leads a mostly normal life. Well, as normal as life gets in Happy Kingdom.
- Ebi (voiced by Carlos Díaz): Ebi-San is Yam Roll's best friend and confidant. He is a boiled shrimp, who wears a band around his "head" and sandals. Ebi is extremely enthusiastic and excitable, and always tries to force Yam Roll into some kind of escapade, often with dangerous and embarrassing results. Ebi is never happy to sit still and is constantly bouncing off the walls with energy.
- Edamame: Edamame Legume is another one of Yam Roll's best friends, a soybean lightly dusted with sea salt. Unlike most of the characters in Yam Roll, Edamame has no arms. Instead, he uses his two legs as arms instead.
- Tamago (voiced by Joe Pingue): Poor Tamago is forced to wear a very heavy and rare omelette on his back all the time. This unfortunate impediment leaves him bitter and emotional, and he constantly complains about the strain on his back (and any other issues that happen to be plaguing him). He tags along with Yam Roll, Ebi and Edamame on their adventures, but never without his fair share of complaints.
- Minamiko (voiced by Sunday Muse): Minamiko is Yam Roll's main love interest, a spicy tuna roll who draws the eye of almost every man in Happy Kingdom. Unfortunately for Yam Roll, Minamiko is practically unaware he exists, even though he consistently saves her from the clutches of evil monsters. Her popularity nets her many dates around the city, and Yam Roll is often low on her list. Yam Roll's rival, Milk Man — a carton of milk — is usually Minamiko's main boyfriend.
- Katcho: Katcho Miso is "an old lump of salty miso bean paste" and Yam Roll's Zen master, who lives atop Mount Foopi. He often has wise teachings for his only pupil, and occasionally a good whack or two from his magic staff. But most of the time Katcho watches from a distance as Yam Roll faces his daily tribulations, preferring to observe instead of interfering.
- Spicy Tuna Cone: Another boyfriend of Minamiko, Spicy Tuna Cone appears to be mayor of the Happy Kingdom, and sometimes EmCees at Hakamaryoke's Karaoke's bar. He also seems to be a minor friend of Yam Roll.
- Genki: A girl who would be happy to date Yam Roll. She is kindhearted and loves stuffed animals.

Yam Roll also hosts a large variety of other sushi characters, including Yam Roll's friends, enemies, and random passers-by. Each character is wittingly named after their sushi names (e.g., Ebi, which means "shrimp" in Japanese).

== Episodes ==
No.	Title	Written by	Original release date	Prod. code
1	"Ding Dong Danger"	Doug Sinclair	February 7, 2006	TBA
2	"High-Heeled Heel"	Jono Howard	February 28, 2006	TBA
3	"Sand in Bikini Problem"	Doug Sinclair	February 8, 2006	TBA
4	"A Doozy of a Doze"	Doug Sinclair	February 27, 2006	TBA
5	"Who Cut the Chi?"	Mike Drach	February 6, 2006	TBA
6	"T-Shirt Swapper Go Home"	Doug Sinclair	February 9, 2006	TBA
7	"Whoop There It Isn't"	Tony Elliot	March 1, 2006	TBA
8	"Kissy Kissy Kiss"	Christine Alexiou	March 2, 2006	TBA
9	"Miso in Love"	Robin Stein	March 9, 2006	TBA
10	"Secret Roommate Man"	Shane Simmons	March 16, 2006	TBA
11	"Forty Winks of Fury"	Jeremy Winkels	March 23, 2006	TBA
12	"The Yolk's on You"	Jono Howard	March 30, 2006	TBA
13	"Egg in Your Face"	Mike Drach	April 8, 2006	TBA
14	"Place Your Order"	Brian Hartigan	April 13, 2006	TBA
15	"Hairy Carry"	Adam Halpern	April 20, 2006	TBA
16	"Karaoke Okey-Dokey"	Christine Alexiou	April 27, 2006	TBA
17	"Maybe Next Tuesday"	Jeremy Winkels	May 1, 2006	TBA
18	"Hot Potato Jam"	Robin Stein	May 2, 2006	TBA
19	"A Look Ma, No Powers"	Mike Kubat	May 3, 2006	TBA
20	"Happy Birth-Daze"	Michael Izen and Gina Woolsey	May 4, 2006	TBA
21	"Big Bubbles, No Troubles"	Tony Elliot	June 1, 2006	TBA
22	"The Way of Woo"	Martin Markle	June 6, 2006	TBA
23	"Two Tons of Love"	Alex Levine	June 5, 2006	TBA
24	"Krappy Kingdom"	Mike Drach	June 8, 2006	TBA
25	"Holy Teriyaki!"	Robin J. Stein	June 15, 2006	TBA
26	"A Pasta of Evil"	Brian Hartigan	June 14, 2006	TBA
27	"Meatloaf in the Middle"	Jeremy Winkels	September 9, 2006	TBA
28	"Honey, I Shrunk the Tamago"	Jono Howard	September 16, 2006	TBA
29	"Monkey See, Money Scratch"	Mike Drach	September 23, 2006	TBA
30	"Give Peas a Chance"	Jono Howard and Christine Alexiou	September 30, 2006	TBA
31	"Raging Bullpen"	Mike Frolick	September 30, 2006	TBA
32	"Don't Fear the Curdler"	Danny Ditata & Jeremy Winkles	October 28, 2006	TBA
33	"The Katcho Hat Show"	Alex Levine	November 4, 2006	TBA
34	"Dial E for Edamame"	Mike Kubat	November 11, 2006	TBA
35	"Doody Calls"	Christine Alexiou	November 18, 2006	TBA
36	"Happy Friend Time"	Robin Stein	November 25, 2006	TBA
37	"The Yam and I"	Panny Pitata and Jeremy Winkles	December 9, 2006	TBA
38	"Rock On"	Mike Frolick	December 16, 2006	TBA
39	"Par for the Course"	Jono Howard & Jon Izen	December 23, 2006	TBA
