= Jone =

Jone may refer to:

- Jone (opera), an 1858 opera in four acts by Errico Petrella
- Jonê County, a county in Gansu, People's Republic of China
- Jone Pinto (born 1991), Brazilian footballer
- DJ JoN-E (born 1984), North American South Asian DJ and Radio Jockey
- Jone (singer), Norwegian singer

== See also ==
- Jones (disambiguation)
