= Ed, Edd n Eddy season 1 =

First season of animated television series Ed, Edd n Eddy

Ed, Edd n Eddy
- Season 1
- DVD cover
- No. of episodes: 13 (26 segments)

Release
- Original network: Cartoon Network
- Original release: January 4 – June 11, 1999

Season chronology
- Next → Season 2

The first season of the animated comedy television series Ed, Edd n Eddy, created by Danny Antonucci, originally aired on Cartoon Network in the United States. Although originally set to premiere in November 1998, the season ran from January 4, 1999, to June 11, 1999, and consists of 13 episodes. The series revolves around three adolescent boys collectively known as "the Eds," who live in a suburban cul-de-sac. Unofficially led by Eddy, the Eds frequently scheme to make money off their peers in order to purchase their favorite confectionery, jawbreakers. However, their plans usually fail, leaving them in various predicaments.

Adult cartoonist Antonucci conceived Ed, Edd n Eddy while working on a commercial design. Antonucci pitched the series to Nickelodeon, but the network declined to give him creative control and Antonucci refused. He then pitched the series to Cartoon Network. The network ended up commissioning the show after agreeing to let Antonucci have control of the show. After its debut, the series was a success in Nielsen ratings, popular among younger and older viewers. Met with generally positive reviews, the season earned Antonucci a Reuben Award for Best Television Animation.

The Complete First Season DVD was released in Region 1 in 2006 and Region 4 in 2007. Both Ed, Edd n Eddy DVD volumes, Edifying Ed-Ventures and Fools' Par-Ed-Ise, also featured season one episodes. All the DVDs were published by Warner Home Video. The entire season can also be purchased from the iTunes Store. The season was written by Antonucci, Jono Howard, Mike Kubat, and Rob Boutilier.

== Cast ==
Matt Hill, Samuel Vincent, and Tony Sampson were cast as Ed, Edd (Double D), and Eddy. David Paul Grove and Keenan Christenson played the parts of Jonny 2 × 4 and Jimmy, respectively, while Sarah was voiced by Janyse Jaud. Peter Kelamis voiced Rolf, while Kathleen Barr was cast as Kevin. Nazz was voiced by Tabitha St. Germain. Erin Fitzgerald played the part of May Kanker. The other two Kanker sisters, Marie and Lee, were voiced by Kathleen Barr and Janyse Jaud.

== Reception ==
=== Ratings ===
Although originally set to premiere on November 7, 1998, it aired on January 4, 1999, as the 6th Cartoon Cartoon, due to minor post-production delays. According to Cartoon Network executive Linda Simensky, the first season did "remarkably well" in ratings following its premiere, becoming one of the top-rated series on the network, prompting Cartoon Network to quickly order-up a second season for a November 1999 premiere, and later a third and fourth.

=== Reviews and accolades ===
Reception of the first season was generally positive, though not as acclaimed as its second season. Despite giving the Edifying Ed-Ventures DVD a negative review, IGN's Mike Drucker praised the show, saying: "Every bit of the show is played for the maximum comic effect, and the interactions between the characters are usually very fun," and particularly praised the season finale, "Avast Ye Eds", saying that it is a "good example of how the animators developed a clever, surreal environment that most kids could probably relate to. They simply go wild and allow regular childhood adventures turn into comedic epics, very over-the-top, but still linked to the way that kids act and react to strange situations." While calling it a "gem" and of "entertaining nature", he criticized the storylines as "repetitive" and said the show "lacks the genius of SpongeBob". Terrence Briggs of Animation World Magazine considered every second of the show "filler" and lamented that the main characters are drawn as "products from the school of acid-trip caricature." After Briggs' review was published, a large number of letters supportive of the show were sent to the magazine, prompting it to "take a second look" at the show. Different reviewers then gave it a positive review, calling it a "fresh show with very different approaches."

The season earned Antonucci a Reuben Award for Best Television Animation. The season had a slight impact on popular culture. A journalist in Tallahassee, Florida wrote a column in his local newspaper about his search for the huge jawbreakers his children saw on Ed, Edd n Eddy. During the run of the first season, a number of fansites were already being set up.

=== Home media ===
Warner Home Video released a number of Ed, Edd n Eddy DVDs, two of which were DVD volumes. The first, titled Edifying Ed-Ventures, was released on May 10, 2005, in region 1 and on May 15, 2006, in region 2, featuring three season one episodes, "Sir Ed-a-Lot", "Who, What, Where, Ed!", and "Avast Ye Eds", out of a total six. It was followed by Fools' Par-Ed-Ise on March 21, 2006, but only featured on episode from the season, "Fool on the Ed".

The Complete First Season 1.33:1 aspect ratio 294-minute two-disc set was released in region 1 on October 10, 2006, and in region 4 on July 18, 2007. The DVD is in English (Dolby Digital Stereo), and is dubbed in French and Spanish, with subtitles in English, Spanish, and French. The set includes special features such as an interview with the creator, "How to make an Ed, Edd n Eddy cartoon", "How to Draw Eddy" and a Cartoon Network commercial bumper featuring Jimmy and Plank. In 2019, this DVD was re-released with a new slipcover after having long been considered out-of-print.

The season is available for download on the iTunes Store. The Fools' Par-Ed-Ise and The Complete First Season DVDs can also be purchased on the Cartoon Network Shop.

== Episodes ==
Every episode of this season is directed by Danny Antonucci.

No. overall	No. in season	Title	Directed by	Written by	Storyboard by	Original release date	Prod. code
1	1	"The Ed-touchables"	Danny Antonucci	Jono Howard & Danny Antonucci	Billy Zeats, Conrad Schmidt, Leah Waldron, Karen Lloyd, & Rob Boutilier	January 4, 1999	102
1	1	"Nagged to Ed"	Danny Antonucci	Mike Kubat (uncredited), Jono Howard, & Danny Antonucci	Gerry Fournier & Jeff Barker	January 4, 1999	102
"The Ed-touchables" – Edd's magnifying glass and Sarah's doll go missing so the Eds think that there is a "serial toucher" stealing people's belongings, and accuse Jonny and Plank of doing it.; "Nagged to Ed" – Lee, May, and Marie Kanker, collectively known as "the Kanker Sisters", lure Ed, Edd, and Eddy into their trailer park home. Once there, the Kankers make the Eds feel right at home by letting them wear their fathers' robes and serving them lunch while the Eds enjoy a movie. The Eds enjoy this hospitality at first, but slowly the sisters reveal that they each have a crush on the three boys.; Note – This episode was originally set to premiere on November 7, 1998 as the series pilot, but was postponed to January 4, 1999 due to minor post-production delays.
2	2	"Pop Goes the Ed"	Danny Antonucci	Jono Howard & Danny Antonucci	Unknown	January 11, 1999	101
2	2	"Over Your Ed"	Danny Antonucci	Jono Howard & Danny Antonucci	Unknown	January 11, 1999	101
"Pop Goes the Ed" – When the cul-de-sac is hit by a heat wave, the Eds crash Nazz's sprinkler party in speedos, which snap off.; "Over Your Ed" – After an energy drink stand is ruined by Ed's poor hygiene, Edd and Eddy decide to clean him up and give him a makeover, which turns out to be a great moneymaker for the Eds, until the Kanker Sisters show up.; Note 1 – These are the only episodes to have a voice of Tabitha St. Germain as Nazz in the pilot.; Note 2 – This is the only episode to have a prototypical end credits that is not seen in the rest of the series.
3	3	"Sir Ed-a-Lot"	Danny Antonucci	Jono Howard & Danny Antonucci	Joel Dickie & Scott "Diggs" Underwood	January 18, 1999	103
3	3	"A Pinch to Grow an Ed"	Danny Antonucci	Jono Howard & Danny Antonucci	Unknown	January 18, 1999	103
"Sir Ed-a-Lot" – Ed has to babysit his younger sister Sarah. Edd and Eddy show up and reluctantly join Sarah's tea party. The Eds spend the rest of the afternoon trying to please "Queen" Sarah and "Prince" Jimmy, who torture them for amusement.; "A Pinch to Grow an Ed" – After Eddy is made fun of for being short, Edd invents a pair of elevator boots for him. Eddy is enjoying himself until the Kankers show up and ruin everything.; Note 1 – "Sir Ed-a-Lot" contains both the first mention of Rolf's name and the town of Peach Creek.; Note 2 – This the first episode to have a voice of Erin Fitzgerald as Nazz for rest of the series.
4	4	"Dawn of the Eds"	Danny Antonucci	Jono Howard, Danny Antonucci, & Rob Boutilier	Unknown	January 25, 1999	104
4	4	"Virt-Ed-Go"	Danny Antonucci	Mike Kubat & Danny Antonucci	Unknown	January 25, 1999	104
"Dawn of the Eds" – Ed wants to see the newest science fiction film, Robot Rebel Ranch, but the Eds will not be able to get in, as the movie is rated R. They try to devise a plan to sneak in while riding a bicycle to the theater, but take a wrong turn and end up in the junkyard, where their imaginations go crazy. While there, they pretend they're on a distant alien planet.; "Virt-Ed-Go" – The Eds are beat after a bird steals their hard-earned quarter. They soon spot a passing plane towing a sign advertising Joe's Clubhouse, which inspires them to start a club and charge for membership. Once again, however, the Kanker Sisters ruin the Eds' plans by taking over the clubhouse before the Eds make any profit.
5	5	"Read All About Ed"	Danny Antonucci	Mike Kubat & Danny Antonucci	Unknown	February 1, 1999	105
5	5	"Quick Shot Ed"	Danny Antonucci	Mike Kubat & Danny Antonucci	Unknown	February 1, 1999	105
"Read All About Ed" – Edd is assigned an early newspaper delivery route to save up for an electron microscope. Eddy is immediately lured, thinking about how much could be earned from multiple paper routes, but did not figure on Ed's incompetence, or the sudden downpour.; "Quick Shot Ed" – The Eds find an old instant-develop camera in Eddy's attic, who comes up with a scam to take pictures of the cul-de-sac children and sell them back to the children in a form of a calendar, which ends up being more difficult than expected.
6	6	"An Ed Too Many"	Danny Antonucci	Mike Kubat, Jono Howard, & Danny Antonucci	Unknown	February 8, 1999	106
6	6	"Ed-n-Seek"	Danny Antonucci	Jono Howard & Danny Antonucci	Unknown	February 8, 1999	106
"An Ed Too Many" – After Edd gives Sarah a flower, she falls in love with him, abandons Jimmy, and follows him wherever he goes, so Ed and Eddy have to get her back together with Jimmy.; "Ed-n-Seek" – The cul-de-sac children are playing hide-and-seek and the Eds participate in the game.
7	7	"Look Into My Eds"	Danny Antonucci	Jono Howard & Danny Antonucci	Unknown	March 1, 1999	107
7	7	"Tag Yer Ed"	Danny Antonucci	Jono Howard & Danny Antonucci	Unknown	March 1, 1999	107
"Look Into My Eds" – After another scam of Eddy's failed, Edd receives a psychology manual in the mail with a hypnotizing wheel inside, with which Eddy controls the cul-de-sac children, until the Kanker Sisters controls the three.; "Tag Yer Ed" – After Kevin and Rolf ridicule Edd for being physically weak, Eddy decides to toughen him up by putting him through a training program, which leads to a wrestling match with the Kankers.
8	8	"Fool on the Ed"	Danny Antonucci	Jono Howard & Danny Antonucci	Unknown	March 8, 1999	108
8	8	"A Boy and His Ed"	Danny Antonucci	Jono Howard & Danny Antonucci	Unknown	March 8, 1999	108
"Fool on the Ed" – Eddy is the best prankster in the cul-de-sac until a mysterious "Prank Master" starts pranking all the children.; "A Boy and His Ed" – Kevin tells the Eds he wants to give them something; Eddy does not believe him, however, and sends him away. After finding out that Kevin was actually giving out jawbreakers to all the children, the Eds try various attempts to befriend him in order to get jawbreakers.
9	9	"It's Way Ed"	Danny Antonucci	Jono Howard & Danny Antonucci	Unknown	March 15, 1999	109
9	9	"Laugh Ed Laugh"	Danny Antonucci	Jono Howard & Danny Antonucci	Unknown	March 15, 1999	109
"It's Way Ed" – The Eds try to keep up with cul-de-sac kids for the latest fad.; "Laugh Ed Laugh" – A chickenpox epidemic hits the cul-de-sac, making Eddy go crazy since there is no one to scam, so Ed and Edd have to capture him.
10	10	"A Glass of Warm Ed"	Danny Antonucci	Jono Howard & Danny Antonucci	Unknown	April 12, 1999	110
10	10	"Flea Bitten Ed"	Danny Antonucci	Jono Howard & Danny Antonucci	Unknown	April 12, 1999	110
"A Glass of Warm Ed" – A peaceful night in the cul-de-sac is interrupted when Edd finds out that Ed is sleepwalking and devouring everyone's food while they are asleep. The next morning, the Eds sell it back to the other children.; "Flea Bitten Ed" – The Eds open up an animal grooming business and clean up all of Rolf's filthy animals. All goes smoothly until Ed's allergic reaction to Rolf's rabbits kicks in.
11	11	"Who, What, Where, Ed!"	Danny Antonucci	Mike Kubat & Danny Antonucci	Unknown	April 19, 1999	111
11	11	"Keeping Up with the Eds"	Danny Antonucci	Mike Kubat & Danny Antonucci	Unknown	April 19, 1999	111
"Who, What, Where, Ed!" – The Eds are hungry, and Eddy is treating them to omelets. After Ed manages to break every egg in the house, they decide to go to Rolf's to see if he will give them a chicken egg. However, to get the egg, the Eds must go through a series of trades.; "Keeping Up with the Eds" – Edd's father wants him to mow the lawn. Ed and Eddy decide to help, but after Ed ruins the yard, Eddy uses his father's "Montezuma's Free Range Manure" fertilizer to turn the cul-de-sac children's lawns into forests and plans to mow them for cash.
12	12	"Eds-Aggerate"	Danny Antonucci	Jono Howard & Danny Antonucci	Unknown	April 26, 1999	112
12	12	"Oath to an Ed"	Danny Antonucci	Jono Howard & Danny Antonucci	Unknown	April 26, 1999	112
"Eds-Aggerate" – After Edd accidentally ends up shooting an armchair at Kevin's house, Eddy makes up a quick lie, telling Kevin the "Mucky Boys" did it. Kevin is convinced, and soon all of the cul-de-sac children are searching for the mysterious Mucky Boys.; "Oath to an Ed" – After ruining their new clothes, the Eds hear about the "Urban Rangers", consisting of Jimmy, Johnny (and Plank), and their leader Rolf, and the fancy uniforms members receive, which prompts them to try to join the group, only to fail at each step.
13	13	"Button Yer Ed"	Danny Antonucci	Jono Howard & Danny Antonucci	Unknown	June 11, 1999	113
13	13	"Avast Ye Eds"	Danny Antonucci	Mike Kubat & Danny Antonucci	Unknown	June 11, 1999	113
"Button Yer Ed" – Ed puts a hole in Edd's screen door, letting a fly in. Trying to swat it, it gets lodged in Eddy's larynx, causing him to temporarily lose his ability to talk. This prompts Ed and Edd to use a bell for Eddy to help him communicate with them. When they can't understand him, they ask Rolf for help.; "Avast Ye Eds" – After a tire-swing scam goes awry, the Eds launch a cruise line on the local creek. The Eds make a cruise ship out of a big tire inner-tube and convince the children, particularly Jimmy, Jonny, and Plank, to go on the cruise. All goes well until the Kanker Sisters cause havoc.
