= Numb Chucks =

Canadian animated TV series

- Title card
- Genre: Adventure-comedy; Fantasy; Slapstick comedy
- Created by: Phil LaFrance; Jamie LeClaire
- Developed by: Jono Howard
- Directed by: Brad Ferguson; Dave Brown
- Voices of: Terry McGurrin; Lou Attia (season 1); Cory Doran (season 2); Bryn McAuley; Andrew Jackson; Robert Tinkler; Julie Lemieux; Joris Jarsky
- Theme music composer: Graeme Cornies
- Opening theme: "Numb Chucks!"
- Ending theme: "Numb Chucks!" (instrumental)
- Composer: Matt Davis
- Country of origin: Canada
- Original language: English
- No. of seasons: 2
- No. of episodes: 52 (104 segments)

Production
- Executive producers: Vince Commisso; Steven Jarosz; Kyle MacDougall
- Producer: Tristan Homer
- Running time: 22 minutes (11 minutes per segment)
- Production companies: Jam Filled Entertainment; 9 Story Media Group (Note: Known as 9 Story Entertainment for the first season.)

Original release
- Network: YTV
- Release: January 7, 2014 – December 1, 2016

Numb Chucks is a Canadian animated television series that was created by Phil LaFrance and Jamie LeClaire and premiered on YTV in Canada on January 7, 2014. The series focuses on Dilweed and Fungus, a pair of woodchucks with big hearts, who are obsessed with using their bungling kung-fu skills to protect the lives of the citizens in their town of Ding-a-Ling Springs. The series aired its final episode on December 1, 2016. 52 episodes were produced over two seasons.

== Plot ==
Dilweed and Fungus, two brother woodchucks, are inspired by a late-night-TV infomercial to order a kung-fu training video from Woodchuck Morris. Despite their negligence and silly antics, they decide to use their newfound skills to protect the citizens in their town of Ding-a-Ling Springs.

== Characters ==
=== Main ===
- Dilweed Chuck (voiced by Terry McGurrin) is a yellow woodchuck and the co-protagonist of the series. He likes to get along with the Ding-a-Ling Springs civilians and learn about kung fu fighting. "Age of Ignorance" reveals that Dilweed is the older twin by 15 seconds. He has a yellow belt.
- Fungus Chuck (voiced by Lou Attia in season 1 and Cory Doran in season 2) is a brown woodchuck and also the co-protagonist. He's just as silly as Dilweed, but even more sillier. He has a white belt and no visible ears.

=== Supporting ===
- Quills (voiced by Bryn McAuley) is a periwinkle porcupine who owns a bowling alley called Pinheads. She is good friends with Dilweed and Fungus unlike Hooves and Buford.
- Buford G. Butternut (voiced by Andrew Jackson) is a blue sheep with white wool and wears white sports socks. As the main antagonist, he despises the Numb Chucks due to their dim-witted immaturity and calls them "chuckleheads".
- Grandma Butternut (voiced by Julie Lemieux) is a yellow sheep and Buford's grandmother.
- Sir Rupert Van Der Hooves (voiced by Robert Tinkler) is a neurotic and German-accented yellow moose who also lives next door to Dilweed and Fungus.
- Woodchuck Morris (voiced by Joris Jarsky) is a golden woodchuck based on Chuck Norris who is the master of Dilweed and Fungus.

=== Minor ===
- Dawn Dingledash is a pink cougar who works as the reporter in Ding-a-Ling Springs.
- Scientist Bob is a brown scientist rabbit.
- Agnes "Granny" Sweetcorn is an old chicken and Grandma Butternut's enemy.
- Mr. Mayor is a blue wolf and the mayor of Ding-a-Ling Springs.
- Dr. Noodle is a kangaroo doctor who appears in the second season.
- Little Timmy is a young rodent kid who has a British accent and is very misfortunate.

=== Other voices ===
- Emilie-Claire Barlow
- David Berni as Reckless Randall, Additional Voices
- Seán Cullen
- Catherine Disher
- Laurie Elliott
- Dwayne Hill
- Howard Jerome
- Linda Kash
- Hadley Kay
- Ron Pardo
- Robert Tinkler
- Adrian Truss
- Pam Hyatt
- Andrew Jackson

== Episodes ==
=== Series overview ===
Season	Episodes	Originally released	
Season	Episodes	First released	Last released
1	26	January 7, 2014	December 9, 2014
2	26	March 17, 2015	December 9, 2016

=== Season 1 (2014) ===
No. overall	No. in season	Title	Written by	Original release date	Prod. code
1	1	"Chuck Be a Lady" / "Couch Potato"	Jono Howard	January 7, 2014	101
Dilweed and Fungus sneak into a school reunion attended by their friend Hooves to find their hero, Woodchuck Morris. The Chucks start a potato charity to impress some kids.
2	2	"Granny's Gone Wild" / "Mummies 'n Dummies"	Jono Howard	January 14, 2014	102
The Chucks take Grandma Butternut grocery shopping, but soon she starts stealing from the shop. The Chucks decorate Pin Heads for a party, but they also must fight a mummy who wandered in there.
3	3	"The Jar of Power" / "The Legend of Snacky Chan"	Brandon Lane Miles Smith	January 21, 2014	103
The Chucks buy a fake Woodchuck Morris fart in a jar from Buford, and the Chucks' new item makes them popular. The Chucks go on a rescue mission to save a vending machine from getting destroyed.
4	4	"Up with the Chucks" / "Attack of Hammer Fist Man"	Mike Kubat Robin J. Stein	January 28, 2014	104
Buford reluctantly aids Quills in throwing a surprise party for the Chucks. The Chucks believe that a villain known as the Hammer Fist Man is going to attack Hooves.
5	5	"Adventures in Bufordsitting" / "Enter the Sheep"	Hollis Ludlow-Carroll Mike Dratch	February 4, 2014	105
Buford is forced to be babysat by the Chucks while Granny's away. Buford acquires a black kung fu belt, which makes him invincible.
6	6	"A Toast to Love" / "Dr. Sinister"	Miles Smith	February 11, 2014	106
Fungus falls in love with a toaster, which makes Dilweed jealous. A new neighbor arrives, who has a secret evil identity that only the Chucks know about.
7	7	"Driving Mr. Buford" / "Who Put the Ding in Ding-a-Ling?"	Jeremy Winkels Mike Kubat	February 18, 2014	107
The Chucks help Buford get to the video game store after the latter breaks his leg. Buford disguises himself as the town's new mascot to do cruel things to the Chucks when no one is watching.
8	8	"D.E.R.P." / "Intelligence Not Included"	Hollis Ludlow-Carroll	February 25, 2014	108
Hooves buys a home security robot to keep the Chucks away from him. The Chucks' talking Woodchuck Morris doll gets reprogramed by Buford.
9	9	"Smell the Knowledge" / "Les Fancy Chucks"	Brandon Lane Mike Frolick	March 4, 2014	110
Dilweed thinks he's lost his kung fu abilities after Buford washes his headband. The Chucks try to get Hooves into a fancy club, but the club finds the obnoxious acts of the Chucks fancy.
10	10	"Breaking Badge" / "Wind Beneath My Wig"	Robin J. Stein Steve Westren	March 11, 2014	111
Fungus finds a "number one" badge in his cereal box, and anything it touches becomes praised by the Chucks. The Chucks teach Granny kung fu, which leads to her going on a rampage through Ding-a-Ling Springs.
11	11	"The Butt-Kick List" / "Hunk-o-Chuck"	Mike Drach Emil Sher	March 18, 2014	113
Fungus makes a list of things to do before a tree grows out of him at sundown. Fungus' new hair stands in the way of both his kung fu dreams and his brother.
12	12	"Swimming Fools" / "Fly Shui"	Emil Sher Mike Kubat	March 25, 2014	112
The Chucks invite themselves over to Hooves' new backyard pool. Fungus takes a liking to flies and uses his own house as a sanctuary for them.
13	13	"Chocolate Dipped Chucks" / "Beach Blanket Bozos"	Terry Saltsman Andrew Healey	April 1, 2014	114
A new chocolate business is stealing customers from Pin Heads. Buford wants Quills to do mouth-to-mouth resuscitation on him, but he keeps getting distracted by the Chucks.
14	14	"Chucky See, Chucky Do" / "Heartsy Fartsy"	Evan Thaler Hickey Allen Markuze	April 8, 2014	115
The Chucks blindfold themselves for an entire day. Granny's valentine is stolen, so the Chucks try to get it back.
15	15	"Old's Well That Ends Well" / "Quills Unleashed"	Hollis Ludlow-Carroll Amy Cole	April 15, 2014	116
Fungus is checked into a retirement home after a long bath makes his skin wrinkly. Quills unintentionally masters the Way of the Chuck.
16	16	"Evacuation Situation" / "Just Chucklax"	Steve Western Hollis Ludlow-Carroll	April 22, 2014	117
The Chucks try to rid a bug infestation in their town after accidentally eating the bug repellent. Granny opens a new hotel, and the Chucks decide to pay a visit.
17	17	"Sock and Awe" / "Recipe for Destruction"	Brandon Lane Hollis Ludlow-Carroll	May 13, 2014	118
Buford trains the duo for a match against two wrestlers they insulted. Granny Sweetcorn, a rival of Granny, steals a pie for a baking contest from her, and the Chucks must retrieve it.
18	18	"Cast Blast" / "Sleeping Hoovesy"	Terry McGurrin Emir Sher	May 27, 2014	119
The Chucks learn Woodchuck Morris is being hospitalized. The Chucks bring a sleeping Hooves to a family reunion.
19	19	"New Improved Chucks" / "Moosetaken Identity"	Aron Dunn Hollis Ludlow-Carroll	June 10, 2014	120
Pin Heads needs a promotion, and the Chucks try to think up of a campaign. The Chucks confuse Hooves with a similar looking robber.
20	20	"Hug-o-War" / "Fan Boy"	Hollis Ludlow-Carroll Miles Smith	June 24, 2014	121
Buford agrees to be Fungus' replacement in a pageant. Fungus befriends a kid, who attempts to kidnap him.
21	21	"Chucks Ahoy" / "Camp Chipper Chuck"	Andrew Healey	August 5, 2014	122
The Chucks and Buford find a treasure map and search for buried treasure. Dilweed and Fungus try to make Buford happy by taking him to camp.
22	22	"Huh Brother, Where Art You?" / "Moment of Tooth"	Andrew Healey Miles Smith	August 26, 2014	123
When Dilweed goes missing, Fungus clings on to Hooves. Dilweed is turned into a mindless minion by Dr. Sinister.
23	23	"Kung Fear" / "Tour Evildoer"	Hollis Ludlow-Carrol	September 9, 2014	124
Buford finds out that the Chucks are afraid of dryer lint. The Chucks take over a tour bus, believing that someone there is a villain.
24	24	"Big Foot Fungus" / "Far Encounters of the Dumb Kind"	Andrew Harrison Brandon Lane	September 23, 2014	125
Fungus and a baby Bigfoot swap positions. Aliens invade the town, and complications ensue when Fungus gets abducted.
25	25	"Mop of Majesty" / "Bubble Bubble Witchy Trouble"	Miles Smith	October 28, 2014	126
The Chucks clean the town with the Mop of Majesty. Everyone grows tired of the Chucks' pranks on Halloween.
26	26	"Deck the Hooves" / "A Buford Carol"	Hollis Ludlow-Carroll Steve Dylan	December 9, 2014	109
When Hooves is mistaken for the real Santa Claus, the Chucks turn his life into a North Pole nightmare. After Buford doesn't go to the Chucks' holiday party again, he finds himself in his own "Christmas Carol".

=== Season 2 (2015–16) ===
No. overall	No. in season	Title	Written by	Original release date	Prod. code
27	1	"Age of Ignorance" / "Orange Is the New Black Belt"	Andrew Harrison Ben Joseph	March 17, 2015	201
Fungus thinks he's older than Dilweed by fifteen seconds. Buford is granted a wish to ban kung fu in Ding-a-Ling Springs.
28	2	"The Ballad of Flappy Joe" / "Chucky Charms"	Josh Gal Shawn Kalb	March 24, 2015	202
Quills attempts to take the Chucks to Pin Heads to show them a new addition to the alley. The Chucks believe that Dilweed has a lucky foot.
29	3	"As the Worm Turns" / "Beaver Fever"	Mark Steinberg Shawn Kalb	April 7, 2015	203
Fungus completely changes in personality when a tapeworm takes refuge in him. After getting his tail flattened, Fungus ends up looking like a beaver.
30	4	"The Birds and the Trees" / "Good Quill Hunting"	Andrew Harrison Emer Connon	April 21, 2015	204
An army of birds invade Ding-a-Ling Springs after their trees are chopped down. After getting the hiccups scared from her, Quills loses her quills.
31	5	"From Dusk 'Til Dawn" / "Quills and Present Danger"	Ben Joseph Josh Saltzman	May 12, 2015	205
Dawn Dingledash is fired from news reporting and moves in with the Chucks. Quills is annoyed by the Chucks constantly trying to save her.
32	6	"Germs of Endearment" / "Artificial Dumbness"	Evan Thaler Hickey Mark Steinberg	May 26, 2015	206
Dilweed and Fungus accidentally create a snot monster that infects the town. Dilweed and Fungus obtain a robot version of Woodchuck Morris.
33	7	"Woodchuck Boris" / "Sheepover Party"	Josh Gal Andrew Harrison	July 14, 2015	207
The Chucks mistake a guy dressed as Woodchuck Morris for the real one. The Chucks have a sleepover party with the mayor's son, while Buford tries to break in.
34	8	"Hooves Line Is It Anyways?" / "End of the Vine"	Ben Joseph Andrew Harrison	July 28, 2015	208
The Chucks and Hooves discover suspicious behaviour from a game show host. The Chucks attempt to cook up a meal for Woodchuck Morris.
35	9	"Up Chuck" / "You Snooze You Bruise"	Josh Gal Evan Thaler Hickey	August 11, 2015	209
The Chucks search for a bunch of Hooves' missing belongings after misplacing them. The Chucks train kids to protect themselves while babysitting them.
36	10	"Tough Love" / "The Iceman Dumb-Eth"	Hollis Ludlow-Carroll Andrew Harrison	August 25, 2015	210
The Chucks attempt to get Hooves and Granny together. The duo unfreeze a caveman, who then kidnaps Quills.
37	11	"A Flock of Steven Seagulls" / "The Chuck Stops Here"	Josh Gal Mark Steinberg	October 6, 2015	211
Buford joins forces with a mysterious hero to scam the Chucks. After injuring the crossing guard, the Chucks vow to take his place.
38	12	"Back to the Kung Future" / "Witless to the Prosecution"	Shawn Kalb Evan Thaler Hickey	October 20, 2015	212
The Chucks are convinced by Buford that they woke up in the future. Dilweed and Fungus act as Buford's lawyers.
39	13	"Numbsicles" / "Are You Smarter Than a Woodchuck?"	Ben Joseph Andrew Harrison	November 3, 2015	213
Dilweed and Fungus mistake Buford's insult as a great nickname. Fungus wears an old pair of glasses, which causes him to act more intelligent.
40	14	"The Place Beyond the Porcupines" / "What About Winky?"	Andrew Harrison Ben Joseph	November 17, 2015	214
A group of bears arrive and start asking absurd questions, bringing up clues on Quills' identity. The Chucks become TV stars after attending a taping of their favorite show.
41	15	"When a Stranger Calls... and Calls... and Calls..." / "Dazed and Contused"	Laurie Elliot Evan Thaler Hickey	January 16, 2016	215
Dilweed and Fungus think Woodchuck Morris is trying to give them directions. Buford gets amnesia, which causes him to see the Chucks as friends.
42	16	"Bling-a-Ling Springs" / "Night Hooves"	Evan Thaler Hickey Andrew Harrison	January 30, 2016	216
Dilweed and Fungus become rich by accident. The Chucks discover Hooves is a member of a bizarre moose club.
43	17	"Dilligan's Island" / "Enter the Kraken"	Ben Joseph Andrew Harrison	April 2, 2016	217
Everyone in Ding-a-Ling Springs gets stranded on a deserted island. Continuing from "Dilligan's Island", the Chucks befriend a weird creature while escaping the island.
44	18	"Six More Weeks of Dumbness" / "The Verminator"	Hollis Ludlow-Carroll Josh Gal	April 9, 2016	218
Groundhog Day goes horribly wrong when Ding-a-Ling Springs is sentenced to six more weeks of winter. Dilweed is mistaken for a robot and gains electrical powers.
45	19	"Children of the Sweetcorn" / "Chuck It Forward"	Ben Joseph Josh Gal	April 16, 2016	220
The Chucks believe that Woodchuck Morris likes Granny Sweetcorn. The Chucks try to entertain a bunch of motorists on the road.
46	20	"Tongue Fu" / "Gum Fu Hustle"	Josh Gal Andrew Harrison	April 23, 2016	221
Fungus decides to start using his tongue after breaking every bone in his body. The Chucks have a misadventure with some gum.
47	21	"Chucks on a Plane" / "The Choptor Is In"	Andrew Harrison Ben Joseph	April 30, 2016	222
The Chucks help Quills overcome her fear of flying. Dilweed replaces Dr. Noodle because of his healing abilities.
48	22	"Skid Varks" / "Zen Fu"	Andrew Harrison Ben Joseph	May 7, 2016	223
The Chucks find aardvark rip-offs of themselves on TV. The Chucks try to find Woodchuck Morris' punching bag.
49	23	"Chucky Con Carny" / "Buford Protection Program"	Andrew Harrison Laurie Elliott	November 28, 2016	224
The Chucks get competitive at the carnival. The Chucks are hired to protect Buford from danger at all costs.
50	24	"The Chucks Get Stuck In a Hole" / "Ding-a-Ling's Toughest"	Josh Gal Stephen Senders	November 29, 2016	225
Everyone thinks that the Chucks are trapped in a hole and do everything they can to rescue them. After a good workout, the Chucks become stronger and bulkier.
51	25	"Spit-uation Critical" / "Get Him to Ding-a-Ling Springs"	Mark Steinberg	November 30, 2016	226
Buford is low on saliva and the Chucks try to get some donors to help him survive. Continuing from "Spit-uation Critical", the Chucks finally meet up with Woodchuck Morris and ask him to help Buford.
52	26	"'Twas the Fight Before Christmas" / "O Evil Tree, O Evil Tree"	Mark Steinberg Josh Saltzman	December 1, 2016	219
The Chucks must save Christmas after beating up Santa by mistake. The Chucks get themselves a Christmas tree that may have strange effects on the world around it.

== Production ==
The series was produced by Jam Filled Entertainment and 9 Story Media Group, in association with YTV, and was produced with the participation of The Canadian Film or Video Production Tax Credit, The Canada Media Fund, Ontario Film and Television Tax Credit, Ontario Computer Animation and Special Effects Tax Credit and with the financial participation of The Shaw Rocket Fund. On June 9, 2014, the series was renewed for a second and final season, which began airing on March 17, 2015, and ended on December 1, 2016.

== Telecast and home media ==
Numb Chucks premiered on YTV in Canada on January 7, 2014, until its final episode aired on December 1, 2016. The series formerly aired repeats on YTV, Teletoon (now Cartoon Network) and Nickelodeon.

On March 10, 2014, Cartoon Network announced the series as part of its 2014–15 season to air on the network in the United States. However, it was later moved to Boomerang and ran from January 10 to July 12, 2015.

Numb Chucks has also been sold to Cartoon Network (Latin America), ABC (Australia), Disney Channels (Central & Eastern Europe, Middle East & Africa, Asia, Israel and Benelux), TG4 (Ireland), Cartoon Network (Italy), Canal+ Family (France) and Super RTL (Germany). The series also aired on TVNZ 2 in New Zealand. The series premiered in the United Kingdom on November 1, 2015, on Pop and Pop Max, several months after Boomerang in the US dumped it.

In Israel, the series premiered on Disney Channel on May 7, 2014, to 2016. There were 26 episodes dubbed in Hebrew.

In Italy, the series premiered on Boing on October 20, 2014.

Currently, the series is now streaming on Tubi.

It also aired on Sony YAY! in India.

It is currently airing on ETB 3 in Basque Country.

No confirmed DVDs were ever released.
