= Justice Jones =

Justice Jones may refer to:

- Benjamin R. Jones (1906–1980), justice of the Pennsylvania Supreme Court
- Burr W. Jones (1846–1935), associate justice of the Wisconsin Supreme Court
- Charles Alvin Jones (1887–1966), chief justice of the Supreme Court of Pennsylvania
- Charles E. Jones (judge) (born 1935), justice of the Arizona Supreme Court
- Horatio M. Jones (1826–1906), associate justice of the Territorial Supreme Court of Nevada
- Hugh R. Jones (1914–2001), judge of the New York Court of Appeals
- Ira B. Jones (1851-1927), chief justice of the South Carolina Supreme Court
- Isaac Thomas Jones (1838–1907), associate justice of the Maryland Court of Appeals
- J. Fred Jones (1907–1991), associate justice of the Arkansas Supreme Court
- Jim Jones (judge) (born 1942), justice of the Idaho Supreme Court
- John Rice Jones (1759–1824), associate justice of the Missouri Supreme Court
- Norman L. Jones (1870–1940), associate justice of the Illinois Supreme Court
- Pleas Jones (1912–1986), associate justice of the Kentucky Court of Appeals and the Kentucky Supreme Court
- Richard L. Jones (1923–1996), associate justice of the Alabama Supreme Court
- Robert Byron Jones (1833–1867), associate justice of the Louisiana Supreme Court
- Robert E. Jones (judge) (born 1927), associate justice of the Oregon Supreme Court
- Theodore T. Jones (1944–2012), judge on New York State's Court of Appeals
- Thomas Jones (English judge) (1614–1692), chief justice of the Common Pleas
- Thomas Jones (Maryland judge) (1735–1812), associate justice of the Maryland Court of Appeals
- Thomas A. Jones (1859–1937), associate justice of the Ohio Supreme Court
- Warren Jones (Idaho judge) (1943–2018), justice of the Idaho Supreme Court
- William E. Jones (politician) (1808 or 1810–1871), associate justice of the Texas Supreme Court
- William J. Jones (1810–1897), associate justice of the Texas Supreme Court

== See also ==
- Judge Jones (disambiguation)
