= Judge Jones =

Judge Jones may refer to:

- Barbara S. Jones (born 1947), judge of the United States District Court for the Southern District of New York
- Bernard M. Jones (born 1979), judge of the United States District Court for the Western District of Oklahoma
- C. Darnell Jones II (born 1949), judge of the United States District Court for the Eastern District of Pennsylvania
- Charles Alvin Jones (1887–1966), judge of the United States Court of Appeals for the Third Circuit
- Courtney Dunbar Jones (born 1978), judge of the United States Tax Court
- Edith Jones (born 1949), chief judge of the United States Court of Appeals for the Fifth Circuit
- James G. Jones (1814–1872), Indiana Attorney General who later served as judge of the Indiana Fifteenth Circuit Court
- James McHall Jones (1823–1851), judge of the United States District Court for the Southern District of California
- James Parker Jones (born 1940), judge of the United States District Court for the Western District of Virginia
- John Bailey Jones (1927–2023), judge of the United States District Court for the District of South Dakota
- John E. Jones III (born 1955), judge of the United States District Court for the Middle District of Pennsylvania
- John Marvin Jones (1882–1976), judge of the United States Court of Claims
- John Rice Jones (1759–1824), judge of the Missouri Supreme Court
- Lake Jones (1867–1930), judge of the United States District Court for the Southern District of Florida
- Napoleon A. Jones Jr. (1940–2009), judge of the United States District Court for the Southern District of California
- Nathaniel R. Jones (1926–2020), judge of the United States Court of Appeals for the Sixth Circuit
- Norman L. Jones (1870–1940), Illinois Circuit Court judge and as Illinois Appellate Court judge before serving on the Illinois Supreme Court
- Okla Jones II (1940–1996), judge of the United States District Court for the Southern District of California
- Paul Jones (judge) (1880–1965), judge of the United States District Court for the Northern District of Ohio
- Richard A. Jones (born 1950), judge of the United States District Court for the Western District of Washington
- Robert Clive Jones (born 1947), judge of the United States District Court for the District of Nevada
- Robert E. Jones (judge) (1927–2025), judge of the United States District Court for the District of Oregon
- Robley D. Jones (1860–1917), associate judge of the Maryland First Judicial Court
- Shirley Brannock Jones (1925–2019), judge of the United States District Court for the District of Maryland
- Steve C. Jones (born 1957), judge of the United States District Court for the Northern District of Georgia
- Theodore T. Jones (1944–2012), judge of the New York Court of Appeals
- Thomas G. Jones (1844–1914), judge of the United States District Courts for the Middle and Northern Districts of Alabama
- Warren Leroy Jones (1895–1993), judge of the United States Court of Appeals for the Fifth Circuit and later for the Eleventh Circuit
- William Blakely Jones (1907–1979), judge of the United States District Court for the District of Columbia
- William Giles Jones (1808–1883), judge of the United States District Courts for the Northern, Middle, and Southern Districts of Alabama
- Woodrow W. Jones (1914–2002), judge of the United States District Court for the Western District of North Carolina

== See also ==
- Justice Jones (disambiguation)
