= Jones Township =

Jones Township may refer to the following townships in the United States:

- Jones Township, Elk County, Pennsylvania
- Jones Township, Beltrami County, Minnesota

== See also ==
- Madawaska Valley, Ontario, amalgamation of Sherwood, Jones and Burns Township with Radcliffe Township and Barry's Bay
