= Mrs. Jones =

Mrs. Jones or Miss Jones can refer to:

- Tulip Jones, a character in the Alex Rider media franchise
- "Mrs. Jones", song by The Iveys from Maybe Tomorrow, 1969
- Miss Jones (radio personality)
- Mrs. Jones, a fictional character in Zig and Zag
- Miss Jones, a character in 1970s comedy Rising Damp

== See also ==
- Mrs. Jones' Birthday, a 1909 film starring Fatty Arbuckles
- Mrs. Jones Entertains, a 1909 film directed by D. W. Griffith
- Miss Jones and Son, a British comedy TV series
- "Me and Mrs. Jones", a song
- Me and Mrs Jones (TV series)
- Me and Mrs. Jones (album), a Johnny Mathis album
