= Keeping up with the Joneses (disambiguation) =

"Keeping up with the Joneses" is an English idiom for trying to match the lifestyle of one's neighbors.

Keeping up with the Joneses may also refer to:

== Music ==
- Keepin' Up with the Joneses, a 1958 album by The Jones Brothers: Thad Jones, Hank Jones and Elvin Jones
- "Keepin' Up with the Joneses", a 1958 song by The Jones Brothers, the title track of the eponymous album Keepin' Up with the Joneses
- "Keepin' Up with the Joneses", a 1977 song by Little Feat off the album Time Loves a Hero
- "Keeping Up with the Joneses", a track from the Indiana Jones and the Last Crusade soundtrack

== Other uses ==
- Keeping Up with the Joneses (comics), a comic strip by Pop Momand that originated the phrase
- Keeping Up with the Joneses (film), a 2016 American film
- Keeping up with the Joneses (TV series), a 2010–2011 Australian reality series
