= Jono Howard =

Canadian writer

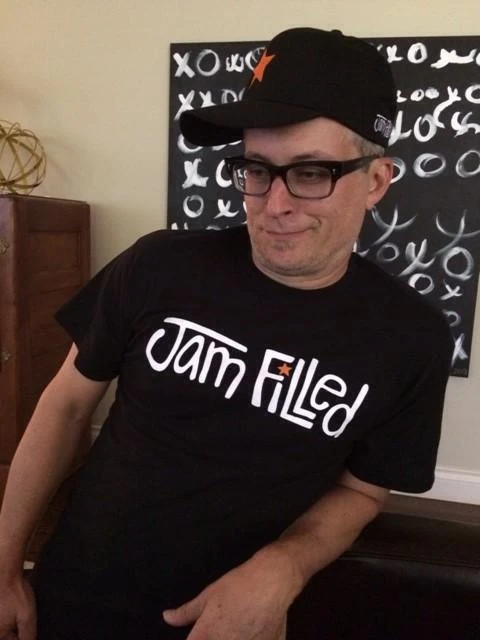
Jono Howard posing wearing merchandise for Jam Filled Entertainment.

Jono Howard is a Canadian writer who works primarily on animated children's shows.

== Career ==
For the majority of his career, Howard worked closely with animator Danny Antonucci.

In 2005, Howard's writing was nominated for a Leo Award. Howard was nominated for a Best Screenwriting award for his script for the 'Atomic Roger' episode of Atomic Betty.

Howard's work has also appeared in print in various publications and issues of Cartoon Network's comic book line (published under the 'Johnny DC' children's imprint of DC Comics). He also co-wrote, with Brendan McCarthy, Tom O'Connor and Robbie Morrison, the final issue of the DC Comics title, Solo.

In July 2005, Howard left Antonucci's a.k.a. Cartoon production company to work on his own material.

Howard and creative partner Jon Izen subsequently produced The Very Good Adventures of Yam Roll in Happy Kingdom, a Flash-animated 11-minute show about an animated piece of sushi, Yam Roll, who must save his unrequited love interest, Minimiko, from various dangers in the city. All of the characters are based on oriental food items. Yam Roll, a cowboy who drives a taxi, vies for Minimiko's attentions with his main rival, a milk carton. Thirty-nine 11-minute episodes were produced.

== Filmography ==
He worked as a staff writer on the following shows:

- ReBoot (1994–1998)
- The Brothers Grunt (1994)
- Santo Bugito (1995)
- Billy the Cat (1996)
- Cybersix (1999–2000)
- Ed, Edd n Eddy (1999–2009)
- Transformers: Armada (2002–2003)
- Yakkity Yak (2002–2003)
- Atomic Betty (2004)
- The Very Good Adventures of Yam Roll in Happy Kingdom (co-creator) (2006)
- Uncle Joe's Cartoon Playhouse (2006)
- G2G: Got to Go! (2008)
- Dex Hamilton: Alien Entomologist (2008)
- Pet Squad (2011–2012)
- Mia and Me (2011–2012)
- Numb Chucks (2014–2016)
- Pirate Express (2015)
- Angry Birds: Summer Madness (2022)
- Dragon Striker (2026)

== Awards and recognition ==
The Very Good Adventures of Yam Roll in Happy Kingdom won the Best Short Animation award at the 2005 Maple Shorts Canadian Animators' Flash Film Festival.
