= Mike Kubat =

Canadian–American television writer and story editor

- Citizenship: Canada; United States
- Occupation: Television writer
- Years active: 1997–present
- Known for: Atomic Betty; Chop Socky Chooks; Ed, Edd n Eddy

Mike Kubat is a Canadian–American television writer. He has worked on such animated series as Mickey and the Roadster Racers, Atomic Betty, Chop Socky Chooks, and Ed, Edd n Eddy. In 2005, he received a Leo Award nomination for Best Screenwriter in an Animation Program or Series for the Atomic Betty episode "Spindly Tam Kanushu". Kubat originally started out wanting to be in a rock band, later becoming an accountant, and finally settling comfortably in his career writing for animation.

== Television work ==
Year	Work	Role	Notes
1999–2009	Ed, Edd n Eddy	Co-writer	33 episodes
2004–2008	Atomic Betty	Writer; story editor	28 episodes
2006	Yam Roll	Writer	2 segments
2008	Chop Socky Chooks	Writer	1 episode
2009	Ed, Edd n Eddy's Big Picture Show	Co-writer	TV movie
2009	Gormiti: The Lords of Nature Return!	Writer	3 episodes
2012	League of Super Evil	Writer	1 episode
2014	Numb Chucks	Writer	3 episodes
2017–2019	Mickey and the Roadster Racers	Writer	12 episodes
