= List of Cartoon Network original films =

This is a list of films that had involvement with Cartoon Network. Films that aired on Adult Swim are included.

== Animated films ==
Original air/release date	Title	Director(s)	Creator(s)/ Developer(s)	Production company(s)	Format	Note(s)
December 10, 1999	Dexter's Laboratory: Ego Trip	Genndy Tartakovsky		Hanna-Barbera	Television premiere	Originally served as the series finale
August 10, 2001	Samurai Jack: The Premiere Movie	Genndy Tartakovsky		Cartoon Network Studios	Television premiere	Three-part series premiere
November 3, 2001	The Flintstones: On the Rocks	David Smith; Chris Savino	William Hanna; Joseph Barbera	Cartoon Network Studios	Television premiere	
July 3, 2002	The Powerpuff Girls Movie	Craig McCracken		Cartoon Network Studios	Theatrical release	
February 27, 2004	Party Wagon	Craig Bartlett; Tuck Tucker	Craig Bartlett	Cartoon Network Studios; Snee-Oosh Productions	Television premiere	
August 13, 2004	Foster's Home for Imaginary Friends: House of Bloo's	Craig McCracken	Craig McCracken; Lauren Faust; Mike Moon	Cartoon Network Studios	Television premiere	Three-part series premiere
August 11, 2006	Codename: Kids Next Door: Operation: Z.E.R.O.	Mr. Warburton		Curious Pictures	Television premiere	
September 15, 2006	Teen Titans: Trouble in Tokyo	Michael Chang; Ben Jones; Matt Youngberg	Glen Murakami; Sam Register	Warner Bros. Animation; Kadokawa Shoten; DC Entertainment	Television premiere	Served as the series finale
November 23, 2006	Foster's Home for Imaginary Friends: Good Wilt Hunting	Craig McCracken		Cartoon Network Studios	Television premiere	
January 14, 2007	My Gym Partner's a Monkey: The Big Field Trip	Timothy Cahill	Julie McNally Cahill; Timothy Cahill	Cartoon Network Studios	Television premiere	
February 18, 2007	Camp Lazlo: Where's Lazlo?	Joe Murray		Cartoon Network Studios; Joe Murray Productions	Television premiere	
March 30, 2007	Billy & Mandy's Big Boogey Adventure	Shaun Cashman; Kris Sherwood; Gordon Kent; Matt Engstrom; Eddy Houchins; Sue Perrotto; Robert Alvarez; Russell Calabrese; Phil Cummings; Mike Lyman; Christine Kolosov	Maxwell Atoms	Cartoon Network Studios	Television premiere	
April 13, 2007	Aqua Teen Hunger Force Colon Movie Film for Theaters	Matt Maiellaro; Dave Willis		Williams Street	Theatrical release	
July 6, 2007	Billy & Mandy: Wrath of the Spider Queen	Matt Engstrom; Gordon Kent; Kris Sherwood	Maxwell Atoms	Cartoon Network Studios	Television premiere	
August 10, 2007	Ben 10: Secret of the Omnitrix	Sebastian O. Montes III; Scooter Tidwell	Man of Action	Cartoon Network Studios; Man of Action Entertainment	Television premiere	
August 31, 2007	Chill Out, Scooby-Doo!	Joe Sichta	Joe Ruby; Ken Spears	Warner Bros. Animation	Television premiere	
January 21, 2008	Codename: Kids Next Door: Operation: I.N.T.E.R.V.I.E.W.S.	Mr. Warburton		Curious Pictures	Television premiere	44-minute series finale
October 12, 2008	Underfist: Halloween Bash	Shaun Cashman	Maxwell Atoms	Cartoon Network Studios	Television premiere	Originally written as a backdoor pilot for a planned spin-off of The Grim Adventures of Billy & Mandy
November 27, 2008	Foster's Home for Imaginary Friends: Destination: Imagination	Craig McCracken; Rob Renzetti	Craig McCracken; Lauren Faust; Mike Moon	Cartoon Network Studios	Television premiere	
November 8, 2009	Ed, Edd n Eddy's Big Picture Show	Danny Antonucci		a.k.a. Cartoon	Television premiere	Served as the series finale
November 24, 2010	Firebreather	Peter Chung		Cartoon Network Studios; Pistor Productions	Television premiere	
November 4, 2011	Johnny Bravo Goes to Bollywood	Van Partible		Cartoon Network Asia Pacific	Television premiere	
March 23, 2012	Ben 10: Destroy All Aliens	Victor Cook	Man of Action	Cartoon Network Studios; Man of Action Entertainment; Cartoon Network Asia Pacific	Television premiere	
December 16, 2012	Exchange Student Zero	Patrick Crawley; Maurice Argiro	Bruce Kane; Maurice Argiro; Patrick Crawley	Bogan Entertainment Solutions; Cartoon Network Asia Pacific	Television premiere	
November 30, 2013	Chakra: The Invincible	Sharad Devarajan	Stan Lee; Sharad Devarajan; Gotham Chopra	Graphic India; POW! Entertainment; Cartoon Network India	Television premiere	
October 31, 2014	Monster Beach	Patrick Crawley	Bruce Kane; Maurice Argiro; Patrick Crawley	Bogan Entertainment Solutions; Fragrant Gumtree Entertainment; Cartoon Network Asia Pacific	Television premiere	
November 25, 2015 (Note: The movie initially premiered at the Downtown Independent theater on August 14, 2015. And was then released on digital platforms on September 1, 2015 and DVD on October 13, 2015.)	Regular Show: The Movie	J. G. Quintel		Cartoon Network Studios	Television premiere	Had a limited theatrical release
July 22, 2018 (TCL Chinese Theatre) July 27, 2018	Teen Titans Go! To the Movies	Peter Rida Michail; Aaron Horvath	Michael Jelenic; Aaron Horvath	Warner Bros. Animation; DC Entertainment	Theatrical release	
July 21, 2019 (San Diego Comic-Con); September 24, 2019 (Digital) (Note: The film was released on Blu-ray & DVD on October 15, 2019, and then premiered on Cartoon Network on February 17, 2020.)	Teen Titans Go! vs. Teen Titans	Jeff Mednikow	Michael Jelenic; Aaron Horvath; Glen Murakami; Sam Register	Warner Bros. Animation; DC Entertainment	Direct-to-video release	Crossover between Teen Titans Go! & Teen Titans
September 2, 2019	Steven Universe: The Movie	Rebecca Sugar		Cartoon Network Studios	Television premiere	
June 30, 2020 (Digital) September 7, 2020	We Bare Bears: The Movie	Daniel Chong		Cartoon Network Studios	Television premiere	Served as the series finale
October 10, 2020	Ben 10 Versus the Universe: The Movie	Henrique Jardim; John McIntyre	Man of Action	Cartoon Network Studios	Television premiere	Theatrical Release in United Arab Emirates
June 20, 2021	Teen Titans Go! See Space Jam	Peter Rida Michail	Michael Jelenic; Aaron Horvath	Warner Bros. Animation; DC Entertainment	Television premiere	Made to promote the upcoming release of Space Jam: A New Legacy
September 14, 2021	Straight Outta Nowhere: Scooby-Doo! Meets Courage the Cowardly Dog	Cecilia Aranovich Hamilton	Joe Ruby; Ken Spears; John R. Dilworth	Warner Bros. Animation (Note: The film was originally in-production at Cartoon Network, but was switched to Warner Bros. Animation before completion.)	Direct-to-video release	Crossover between the Scooby-Doo! franchise & Courage the Cowardly Dog
May 24, 2022	Teen Titans Go! & DC Super Hero Girls: Mayhem in the Multiverse	Matt Peters; Katie Rice	Michael Jelenic; Aaron Horvath; Lauren Faust	Warner Bros. Animation; DC Entertainment	Direct-to-video release	Crossover between Teen Titans Go! & DC Super Hero Girls
November 8, 2022	Aqua Teen Forever: Plantasm	Matt Maiellaro; Dave Willis		Williams Street; Bento Box Entertainment	Direct-to-video release	
July 21, 2023	The Venture Bros.: Radiant is the Blood of the Baboon Heart	Jackson Publick	Jackson Publick; Doc Hammer	Williams Street; Astro Base GO! Titmouse, Inc	Direct-to-video release	
August 22, 2023	Metalocalypse: Army of the Doomstar	Brendon Small; Tommy Blacha		Williams Street; Titmouse, Inc	Direct-to-video release	
December 11, 2023 (Digital) January 13, 2024	Craig Before the Creek	Matt Burnett; Ben Levin	Matt Burnett; Ben Levin; Shauna McGarry	Cartoon Network Studios	Television premiere	Prequel of Craig of the Creek
October 23, 2025 (Mexico)	I Am Frankelda	Arturo and Roy Ambriz		Cinema Fantasma; Warner Bros. Discovery; Cine Vendaval; Woo Films	Theatrical release	Direct-to-streaming international release by Netflix on June 12, 2026
TBA	The Amazing World of Gumball: The Movie!	Ben Bocquelet; Mic Graves	Ben Bocquelet	Hanna-Barbera Studios Europe	TBA	
TBA	The Adventure Time Movie	TBA	Pendleton Ward	Cartoon Network Studios; Frederator Studios	TBA	
TBA	Untitled Powerpuff Girls film	TBA	Craig McCracken	Warner Bros. Pictures Animation; Cartoon Network Studios	Theatrical release	

== Live-action films ==
Title	Original air/release date	Director(s)	Creator(s)/ Developer(s)	Production company(s)	Format	Notes
Re-Animated	December 8, 2006	Bruce Hurwit	Tim McKeon; Adam Pava	Renegade Animation; Turner Studios	Television premiere	
Ben 10: Race Against Time	November 21, 2007	Alex Winter	Man of Action	Alive and Kicking, Inc.	Television premiere	Limited Theatrical Release in Mexico and Asia
Scooby-Doo! The Mystery Begins	September 13, 2009	Brian Levant	Joe Ruby; Ken Spears	Warner Premiere	Television premiere	
Ben 10: Alien Swarm	November 25, 2009	Alex Winter	Man of Action	Trouper Productions; Alive and Kicking, Inc.	Television premiere	Limited Threatrical Release in Australia and Asia
Scooby-Doo! Curse of the Lake Monster	October 16, 2010	Brian Levant	Joe Ruby; Ken Spears	Warner Premiere; Atlas Entertainment; Telvan Productions; Nine/8 Entertainment	Television premiere	
Level Up	November 23, 2011	Peter Lauer	Derek Guiley; David Schneiderman	D and D Productions; Alive and Kicking, Inc. Cartoon Network Studios	Television premiere	

== See also ==
- List of programs broadcast by Cartoon Network
- Cartoon Network Studios productions
