= List of Johnny Bravo episodes =

Johnny Bravo is an American animated television series created by Van Partible for Cartoon Network. The series initially debuted as a trio of animated shorts on Cartoon Network's World Premiere Toons (later renamed What a Cartoon!), an animated shorts showcase. What a Cartoon! premiered the first Johnny Bravo short on March 5, 1995. After a full series was greenlit by Cartoon Network, the shorts were later incorporated as the first episode of the show's first season, which premiered on the channel on July 14, 1997.

Following a change in the main character's theme from being a womanizing Elvis impersonator to a brawny halfwit, the series entered its second season, which premiered on July 2, 1999. Partible left the series after the first season, but he returned for its fourth, which premiered on February 20, 2004, and ended on August 27, 2004.

== Series overview ==
Season	Segments	Episodes	Originally released		
Season	Segments	Episodes	First released	Last released	Network
1	38	13	March 5, 1995	December 15, 1997	Cartoon Network
2	66	22	July 2, 1999	January 28, 2000	Cartoon Network
3	51	17	August 11, 2000	June 14, 2002	Cartoon Network
Specials	N/A	2	December 7, 2001	February 14, 2003	Cartoon Network
4	24	13	February 20, 2004	August 27, 2004	Cartoon Network
Television film			2011		Cartoon Network (India)

== Episodes ==
=== Season 1 (1995–97) ===
The first three segments aired as part of World Premiere Toons, later renamed What a Cartoon!. They all later incorporated into the show's first season as the first episode.

No. overall	No. in season	Title	Directed by	Written by	Storyboard by	Original release date	Prod. code
1a	1a	"Johnny Bravo"	Van Partible	Van Partible	Travis Cowsill	March 5, 1995 (World Premiere Toons)	WPT01
A dimwitted man named Johnny Bravo plays the role of a superhero as a 900-pound gorilla escapes from the zoo.
1b	1b	"Jungle Boy in Mr Monkeyman"	Van Partible	Van Partible	Butch Hartman	October 9, 1996 (World Premiere Toons)	WPT02
The evil King Raymond (Michael McKean) attempts to frame Jungle Boy to reclaim the praise that the other animals used to give him.
1c	1c	"Johnny Bravo and the Amazon Women"	Van Partible	Van Partible	Robert Ramirez	January 1, 1997 (World Premiere Toons)	HH00615-94052
In what seems to be a dream come true for Johnny, he falls off a ship and finds himself on an island surrounded by beautiful Amazon women.
2a	2a	"Super Duped"	Rumen Petkov	Butch Hartman	Cos Anzilotti & Brad Vandergrift	July 14, 1997	96-001
In an effort to impress Suzy's beautiful teacher, Johnny goes along with a gag that he is "Bravo-Man", his superhero alter-ego.
2b	2b	"Bungled in the Jungle"	Rumen Petkov	Steve Marmel	Zac Moncrief & Eugene Mattos	July 14, 1997	96-002
Flying high above the jungle on a plane, Johnny makes a stewardess angry by his constant flirting with her. As a result, the stewardess boots Johnny off the airplane mid-flight. When Johnny comes down, he soon meets Jungle Boy.
2c	2c	"Bearly Enough Time!"	Butch Hartman	Steve Marmel	Butch Hartman & Barrington Bunce	July 14, 1997	96-004
When Johnny has reason to believe that his mother, Bunny Bravo, is out in the forest lost, he goes on a quest to find her, only to awaken Chronos the Bear (Brock Peters), a very large and hungry grizzly bear.
3a	3a	"The Sensitive Male!"	Butch Hartman	Story by : Steve Marmel; Teleplay by : Seth MacFarlane	Butch Hartman & Don Manuel	July 21, 1997	96-003
Johnny tries to get a date with a girl who is in love with a sensitive dancer. A man (Jack Sheldon, of Schoolhouse Rock! fame) comes along and offers Johnny lessons on how to be the kind of sensitive guy that women want.
3b	3b	"Bravo Dooby-Doo"	John McIntyre	Michael Ryan	Seth MacFarlane & Brad Vandergrift	July 21, 1997	96-008
When Johnny's elderly aunt, Aunt Jebedissa Bravo, disappears, he enlists the help of Scooby-Doo, Shaggy Rogers (played by Casey Kasem), Fred Jones, Daphne Blake, and Velma Dinkley to crack the case and capture a Ghost.
4a	4a	"Date with an Antelope"	John McIntyre	Seth MacFarlane	Sean Bishop	July 28, 1997	96-006
A lonely Johnny decides to try internet dating, but unwittingly to be set up with a female antelope named Carol (Gabrielle Carteris).
4b	4b	"Did You See a Bull Run by Here?"	Rumen Petkov	Story by : Van Partible; Teleplay by : Michael Ryan	Barrington Bunce	July 28, 1997	96-007
Johnny pays a visit to Pamplona to watch the running of the bulls, but he ends up in a bullfight of his own.
4c	4c	"Cookie Crisis"	Butch Hartman	Butch Hartman	Zac Moncrief	July 28, 1997	96-016
Little Suzy plays a Buttercup Scout who is determined to get Johnny to buy some of her delicious cookies. Johnny, not wanting to break his strict diet, travels all across town to escape Suzy, who foils his every attempt to get away. The episode spoofs Dr. Seuss' Green Eggs and Ham.
5a	5a	"I Used to Be Funny"	John McIntyre	Story by : Van Partible; Teleplay by : Michael Ryan & Steve Marmel	Eugene Mattos	August 4, 1997	96-009
Two clowns – one more old-fashioned (Jonathan Winters), one trendier (Kevin McDonald), each lay claim to a particular street corner in Aron City, and decide to play a series of pranks on an unsuspecting bystander to determine which of them is funnier. That bystander happens to be the clown-hating Johnny, who finds himself repeatedly humiliated by their practical jokes.
5b	5b	"My Fair Dork"	John McIntyre	Seth MacFarlane	Eugene Mattos	August 4, 1997	96-010
When the school geek wants to take Suzy to the school dance, Johnny decides to help. However, he soon learns that his lady-grabbing tactics work better for the geek than they do for him, as the student becomes the master.
5c	5c	"'Twas the Night"	Rumen Petkov	Story by : Butch Hartman & Steve Marmel; Teleplay by : Steve Marmel	Brad Vandergrift	August 4, 1997	96-011
When Johnny mistakes Santa Claus for a burglar and knocks out jolly old Saint Nick (Tom Bosley), he must don the red cap to save Christmas.
6a	6a	"Blarney Buddies"	Butch Hartman	Butch Hartman	Jeff DeGrandis	August 11, 1997	96-012
Johnny is in Ireland and reads about the Blarney Stone, which he mistakes for a leprechaun named Barney Stone (Frank Gorshin), who can grant wishes. Johnny tries to track Barney down, and after much coaxing, Barney finally grants Johnny his wish, which is to be attracted by chicks. But it turns out Johnny becomes attractive to chickens.
6b	6b	"Over the Hump!"	Butch Hartman	Butch Hartman	Kirk Hanson	August 11, 1997	96-017
Johnny accidentally joins the French Foreign Legion and soon finds himself on a game show in Ancient Egypt, where he must find a way through the desert with the help of a reluctant camel named Lawrence (Michael Jeter).
6c	6c	"Johnny Meets Farrah Fawcett"	Rumen Petkov	Story by : Van Partible; Teleplay by : Michael Ryan	Zac Moncrief	August 11, 1997	96-014
Suzy invites Johnny to her birthday party, but Johnny refuses. All of that changes when Johnny finds out that Farrah Fawcett, Suzy's cousin, will be at the party.
7a	7a	"Blanky Hanky Panky"	Rumen Petkov	Steve Marmel	Eugene Mattos	August 18, 1997	96-015
All the wool in the city (including Johnny's blanky) is being stolen by an evil, wool-loving thief named Dr. Filaniest (Jeffrey Tambor) and his kind pet kitten, Pooky the Cat (Billy West). Johnny plays the role of hero, as he tracks down and defeats Dr. Filaniest.
7b	7b	"Talk to Me, Baby"	John McIntyre	Steve Marmel	Eugene Mattos	August 18, 1997	96-005
Johnny goes on a television talk show hosted by a model named Vendela.
7c	7c	"Hip Hop Flop"	John McIntyre	Steve Marmel	Mucci Fassett	August 18, 1997	96-013
Johnny tries to get a date with a female hip-hop fan by claiming he knows "The Round Pound," her favorite group. As it happens, the rappers of the Round Pound need help replacing some equipment, and when Johnny provides it, they agree to teach him how to become a hip-hop star.
8a	8a	"Beach Blanket Bravo"	John McIntyre	Story by : Michael Ryan & Robert Ramirez; Teleplay by : Michael Ryan	Barrington Bunce	August 25, 1997	96-018
When Johnny takes a trip to the beach, he winds up at a party, where a hot girl named Franny (Maureen McCormick) uses him to make her rude and selfish boyfriend, Andy (Rick Springfield), jealous. An angry Andy challenges Johnny to the "King of the Beach" contest to determine which of them will get to win Franny's heart. Along the way, they must escape a great white shark named Buster (name unmentioned in the episode) who pretends he's Richard Nixon and later Martha Washington so he can eat swimmers.
8b	8b	"The Day the Earth Didn't Move Around Very Much"	Butch Hartman	Seth MacFarlane	Don Manuel	August 25, 1997	96-019
Johnny is brought before a courtroom to explain his actions from the previous day. A flashback begins, and Johnny explains that after seeing his blinking alarm clock that morning, he firmly believed that time had frozen and left him the only person able to move. A series of incredibly odd coincidences repeatedly affirms Johnny's claim, and he abuses his power by stealing candy, dining in a high-class restaurant, and sleeping in a five-star hotel without paying.
8c	8c	"The Aisle of Mixed-Up Toys"	Rumen Petkov	Story by : Michael Ryan; Teleplay by : Seth MacFarlane	Cos Anzilotti	August 25, 1997	96-020
When Johnny wants a little girl's older sister to fall for him, he must go into the discount toy-aisle to buy some toys for them.
9a	9a	"Substitute Teacher"	John McIntyre	Michael Ryan	Barrington Bunce	September 1, 1997	96-021
When a criminal (Mark Hamill) robs Johnny's karate dojo, he dupes Johnny into believing he is the substitute teacher.
9b	9b	"A Wolf in Chick's Clothing"	Butch Hartman	Butch Hartman	Ace Conrad	September 1, 1997	96-022
Johnny meets an amazing, seductive girl named Fluffy (Anne Bloom), only to find out she is actually a werewolf. She promises that she will offer Johnny a great time if he can make it through one night with her transformed state. Unfortunately, on Wednesdays, she turns into a fat, short, bald, and annoying man named Melvin who collects stamps.
9c	9c	"Intensive Care"	Rumen Petkov	Story by : Michael Ryan & Robert Ramirez; Teleplay by : Michael Ryan	Butch Hartman	September 1, 1997	96-023
Johnny goes to the hospital to visit Suzy, only to find a beautiful nurse tending to her. Unfortunately, another employee continues to get in his way.
10a	10a	"Jumbo Johnny"	Rumen Petkov	Story by : Steve Marmel; Teleplay by : Seth MacFarlane	Eugene Mattos & Zac Moncrief	September 8, 1997	96-024
Johnny, hoping to gain more muscle, buys a protein shake called "Uber Mass" from a shady scientist (John Astin) at the gym. He ignores the instructions in favor of drinking it all at once, and bloats up to a massively obese size. After drinking even more Uber Mass, Johnny grows to Godzilla-like proportions and decides to seek an antidote.
10b	10b	"The Perfect Gift"	John McIntyre	Steve Marmel	Bob Onorato	September 8, 1997	96-025
With Mother's Day just around the corner, Johnny tries to find a way to make money to buy his mama a gift. While Suzy becomes ridiculously wealthy with her simple lemonade stand, Johnny goes through all manner of jobs in an effort to raise the cash he needs.
10c	10c	"Bravo, James Bravo"	Butch Hartman	Steve Marmel	Brad Vandergrift	September 8, 1997	96-033
Johnny hits on a beautiful woman named Jane (Moira Quirk), who turns out to be a secret agent. When Johnny compromises security at Jane's headquarters, her boss makes them work together to defeat the evil Dr. Pencilneck (Richard Steven Horvitz) and thwart his nefarious–yet incredibly politically correct–scheme.
11a	11a	"Going Batty"	Rumen Petkov	Steve Marmel	Eugene Mattos	December 1, 1997	96-027
A beautiful vampire named Lois (Alison La Placa) decides to use Johnny to make Woody (Marvin Kaplan), her current boyfriend, jealous.
11b	11b	"Berry the Butler"	Butch Hartman	Butch Hartman	Zac Moncrief	December 1, 1997	96-035
Bunny wins a contest, that makes Berry Vanderbolten (Tom Kane), a famous singer, be her butler for the day. Yet, Johnny takes advantage of the situation and abuses it, as he nearly makes Berry his slave.
11c	11c	"Red Faced in the White House"	John McIntyre	Steve Marmel	Cos Anzilotti	December 1, 1997	96-029
Johnny goes on a date with the President's daughter, Bonnie (Mayim Bialik), only to outrage and humiliate her with his lack of knowledge of Washington by accident. Johnny then finds himself, beaten up by her bodyguards (who are secret service agents), Agent Pim and Agent Shlomo. However, Pim and Shlomo are more skilled as fighters than Johnny is in karate, jujitsu, and interpretive dance.
12a	12a	"The Man Who Cried 'Clown'"	Rumen Petkov	Michael Ryan	Barking Bullfrog Cartoon Company, Inc.	December 8, 1997	96-030
Johnny and Bunny book passage on a plane. When Johnny sees a clown on the wing of the plane, he tries to warn everyone of the danger. When no one believes him, Johnny takes matters into his own hands and removes one of the clowns by pushing him off the plane. His actions embarrasses everyone when the furious pilots explains the hiring of the clowns and punishes him by being a clown himself.
12b	12b	"Johnny Real Good"	John McIntyre	Seth MacFarlane	Barking Bullfrog Cartoon Company, Inc.	December 8, 1997	96-031
Johnny answers an ad to babysit for a boy named Timmy (Kevin McDonald), who has god-like superpowers. Johnny's sheer idiocy puts him at odds with the omnipotent Timmy, who repeatedly transports him to a cornfield just outside the house.
12c	12c	"Little Talky Tabitha!"	Butch Hartman	Butch Hartman	Barking Bullfrog Cartoon Company, Inc.	December 8, 1997	96-032
Suzy has a new doll named Talky Tabitha (Jean Kasem), and invites Johnny over for a tea party to play with her – but Tabitha starts talking independently, and says she doesn't like Johnny. Johnny squares off against the doll, who repeatedly thwarts his efforts to destroy her.
13a	13a	"Johnny Bravo Meets Adam West!"	Butch Hartman	Butch Hartman & Seth MacFarlane	Barrington Bunce	December 15, 1997	96-026
Johnny watches Adam West solve children's problems on TV while waiting for Bunny to return home from her trip to the market. When she is a minute late, Johnny immediately assumes that something has gone wrong, and seeks out West's help to find her. The TV hero proves to be truly bizarre and illogical, and leads Johnny on a wild goose chase by interpreting "clues" such as trash and Chinese restaurant names.
13b	13b	"Under the Big Flop"	Rumen Petkov	Michael Ryan	Barrington Bunce	December 15, 1997	96-028
Johnny takes Suzy to the circus, only to find that an evil ringmaster named Vivian Vixen (Suzie Plakson) has Jungle Boy under a mind control device.
13c	13c	"Johnny Meets Donny Osmond"	John McIntyre	Seth MacFarlane	Don Manuel	December 15, 1997	96-034
Bunny fears that Johnny has grown out of control without supervision, and decides to hire him a nanny. She settles on Donny Osmond, whose overly cheerful attitude and childish ideas of fun drive Johnny crazy.

=== Season 2 (1999–2000) ===
No. overall	No. in season	Title	Directed by	Written by	Storyboard by	Original release date	Prod. code
14a	1a	"Bikini Space Planet!"	Russell Calabrese	Jed Spingarn	Lynell H. Forestall, Drew Graybeal, and Michael Diederich	July 2, 1999	201a
Johnny is kidnapped by two beautiful female aliens, who believe him to be the perfect human specimen.
14b	1b	"Moby Jerk"	Kirk Tingblad	Story by : Wendell Morris & Jed Spingarn; Teleplay by : Jed Spingarn & Gene Grillo	Mary Hanley	July 2, 1999	201b
After winning a cruise on a boat, Johnny accidentally gets on the wrong boat. Here, Johnny meets Captain Spleen, who expects Johnny to catch a legendary bad-mouth merman named Moby Jerk.
14c	1c	"A Gel for Johnny"	Kirk Tingblad	Jed Spingarn	Lynell H. Forestall	July 2, 1999	201c
One of Johnny's worst nightmares becomes reality when he runs out of "Mr. Kevin's Triple-Strength Hair Cement", his hair gel.
15a	2a	"Johnny Get Your Tutu"	Russell Calabrese	Jed Spingarn	Michael Diederich	July 30, 1999	202a
After accidentally sending a picture of Suzy with his career test, Johnny is selected as a ballerina in a studio.
15b	2b	"Johnny's Inferno"	Russell Calabrese	Gene Grillo & Jed Spingarn	Doug Compton	July 30, 1999	202b
Johnny unwittingly follows the instructions of a satanic notebook in an attempt to get buff, thus summoning a devil named Derek that enlists him to join on an evil rampage. When Johnny's attempts to help him end up becoming good things, he possesses Johnny to use his body to wreak havoc on the entire world.
15c	2c	"Forest Chump"	Kirk Tingblad	Jed Spingarn & Gene Grillo	Neal Sternecky	July 30, 1999	202c
After being swept over a waterfall, Johnny and Carl come across hot native chicks.
16a	3a	"Karma Krisis"	Russell Calabrese	Gene Grillo	Bob Onorato	August 6, 1999	203a
Johnny does not listen to Bunny's advice, and he rips up a chain letter. This results in a long run of bad luck, and a timely appearance by Dionne Warwick.
16b	3b	"A Star Is Bruised"	Kirk Tingblad	Jed Spingarn	Bob Jaques	August 6, 1999	203b
Johnny meets his hero, Squint Ringo, and performs the stuntman for his show.
16c	3c	"The Prince and the Pinhead"	Russell Calabrese	John Crane, Gene Grillo, & Jed Spingarn	Michael Diederich	August 6, 1999	203c
A prince from a far kingdom is bored of being ruler and sees that Johnny looks exactly like him. Thus, the two switch places, and Johnny gets to be prince.
17a	4a	"Claws"	Kirk Tingblad	Jed Spingarn	Mary Hanley	August 13, 1999	204a
To make a special dinner for his mother, Johnny buys a lobster. Unfortunately, the lobster will not cooperate.
17b	4b	"To Helga and Back"	Kirk Tingblad	Gene Grillo	Lynell H. Forestall	August 13, 1999	204b
Johnny sends away for a mail order perfect woman, but accidentally picks a Swedish fat woman named Helga instead. In an effort to ruin their "relationship", Johnny takes Helga to Steel Cage wrestling.
17c	4c	"Cover Boy"	Russell Calabrese	Gene Grillo	Tom Mazzocco	August 13, 1999	204c
With a little help from Carl and Pops, Johnny gets a job as a fashion model (so he can meet female models). Unfortunately, Johnny gets exposed to poison ivy, and gets fired in the process.
18a	5a	"Endless Bummer"	Russell Calabrese	John Crane & Gene Grillo	Tom Mazzocco	August 20, 1999	205a
Johnny plays lifeguard in hopes to attract chicks.
18b	5b	"Jailbird Johnny"	Russell Calabrese	Jed Spingarn	Dave Schwartz	August 20, 1999	205b
A mistake in the judicial system gets Johnny thrown into a women's prison.
18c	5c	"Bravo 13"	Kirk Tingblad	Gene Grillo & Jed Spingarn	Lynell H. Forestall	August 20, 1999	205c
Johnny becomes an astronaut when he is mistakenly launched into space with an annoying chimpanzee.
19a	6a	"Doomates"	Russell Calabrese	Gene Grillo and John Crane	Michael Diederich	August 27, 1999	206a
When Bunny puts in a V-chip to limit Johnny's TV-watching, he moves into a trailer, with Carl as his new roommate. Johnny and Carl soon begin to argue about the TV, and Carl wins the battle, only for the trailer to fall down a cliff, sending Johnny and Carl tumbling down.
19b	6b	"Johnny's Telethon"	Kirk Tingblad	Jed Spingarn	Neal Sternecky	August 27, 1999	206b
When it is announced that Johnny's favorite beef jerky store will be going out of business, Johnny decides to stage a telethon to save it.
19c	6c	"Johnny's Guardian Angel"	Russell Calabrese	Jed Spingarn & Gene Grillo	Doug Compton	August 27, 1999	206c
After causing numerous disasters for Carl, Bunny, and Suzy, Johnny wishes that he had never been born. Maurice, Johnny's guardian angel, shows him what life would be like if he was never born, which actually turns out to be much better.
20a	7a	"I, Fly"	Kirk Tingblad	John Crane, Gene Grillo, & Jed Spingarn	TBA	September 3, 1999	207a
While guarding Carl's science project, Johnny accidentally turns himself into a fly.
20b	7b	"Schnook of the North"	Russell Calabrese	Gene Grillo	Tom Mazzocco	September 3, 1999	207b
When Johnny loses Bunny in a grocery store, he is given away to a foster family in Antarctica.
20c	7c	"Charm School Johnny"	Kirk Tingblad	John Crane, Gene Grillo, & Jed Spingarn	Mary Hanley	September 3, 1999	207c
Johnny talks to a beautiful woman eating at Pops' restaurant, and she tells Johnny that he is no gentleman. Pops attempts to take Johnny and turn him into a gentleman, worthy of high society, within seven days.
21a	8a	"Johnny and the Beanstalk"	Russell Calabrese	Russell Calabrese and Dave Schwartz	Dave Schwartz	September 10, 1999	208a
Parodying with Jack and the Beanstalk, Johnny trades the family cow for some magical hair tonic.
21b	8b	"A Boy and His Bird"	Kirk Tingblad	Jed Spingarn & Gene Grillo	Neal Sternecky	September 10, 1999	208b
In an attempt to get a date with a beautiful dog-loving chick, Johnny adopts a pet emu, which proves to be more than he bargained for.
21c	8c	"Ape Is Enough"	Russell Calabrese	Jed Spingarn, Gene Grillo, and Wendell Morris	Michael Diederich	September 10, 1999	208c
Johnny visits the South Seas, where a giant female gorilla falls in love with him.
22a	9a	"Panic in Jerky Town"	Kirk Tingblad	John Crane & Gene Grillo	Lynell H. Forestall	September 17, 1999	209a
Johnny wins a free trip to Jerky Town and takes Pops with him. Johnny is going to be named successor of Jerky Town until Pops finds out the secret ingredient in the jerky. Pops reveals it, and Jerky gets Johnny and Pops thrown out.
22b	9b	"Alien Confidential"	Russell Calabrese	Jed Spingarn	Tom Mazzocco	September 17, 1999	209b
An alien lands on Earth with the secret of universal peace. After Johnny takes the alien to Pops, a mob starts chasing them.
22c	9c	"Mama's New Boyfriend"	Kirk Tingblad	Gene Grillo & Jed Spingarn	Mary Hanley	September 17, 1999	209c
Bunny gets a new boyfriend named Raul Montoya, but Johnny thinks that he is only dating her for her money.
23a	10a	"Welcome Back, Bravo"	Russell Calabrese	John Crane, Gene Grillo, & Jed Spingarn	Dave Schwartz	September 24, 1999	210a
A clerical error results in Johnny having to pass the 4th grade all over again.
23b	10b	"The Man with the Golden Gut"	Kirk Tingblad	John Crane, Gene Grillo, & Jed Spingarn	Neal Sternecky	September 24, 1999	210b
Johnny orders an ab machine, but instead of getting a six pack, his muscles form the shape of Mount Rushmore, making him a tourist attraction. Then, he gets a big fat belly.
23c	10c	"Aunt Katie's Farm"	Russell Calabrese	John Crane, Gene Grillo, & Jed Spingarn	Doug Compton	September 24, 1999	210c
Johnny takes Suzy to her favorite children's show and ends up as one of the stars.
24a	11a	"A League of His Own"	Kirk Tingblad	Gene Grillo & Jed Spingarn	Mary Hanley	October 1, 1999	211a
Johnny poses as a girl who is "large for her age" to help out Bunny and Suzy's softball team.
24b	11b	"Johnny Goes to Camp"	Russell Calabrese	Gene Grillo & Jed Spingarn	Michael Diederich	October 1, 1999	211b
Johnny gets on the wrong bus and ends up at computer camp, with Carl as his counselor.
24c	11c	"Buffoon Lagoon"	Kirk Tingblad	John Crane & Gene Grillo	Lynell H. Forestall	October 1, 1999	211c
Johnny is shipwrecked with a pretty woman who is very cranky and spends her time running away from him.
25a	12a	"Brave New Johnny"	Russell Calabrese	Gene Grillo	Michael Diederich	October 8, 1999	212a
Johnny falls into a pool of hair gel and is broken out of the amber-like mass 500 years into the future by Carl Chryniszzswics the 6th.
25b	12b	"Witless"	Kirk Tingblad	Jed Spingarn & Gene Grillo	Neal Sternecky	October 8, 1999	212b
Johnny joins an Amish community, and everybody thinks that Johnny is a relative from very far.
25c	12c	"Carl Be Not Proud"	Russell Calabrese	Jed Spingarn & Gene Grillo	Doug Compton	October 8, 1999	212c
Johnny decides to be nice to Carl, thinking that he is going to die, but Carl takes advantage of him.
26a	13a	"El Bravo Magnifico"	Kirk Tingblad	Gene Grillo & Jed Spingarn	Lynell H. Forestall, Mary Hanley, Dave Schwartz, and Neal Sternecky	October 15, 1999	213a
Johnny is mistaken for a karate expert, and agrees to help a "South of the border" town defeat an evil Mexican thief.
26b	13b	"Johnny-O & Juliet"	Kirk Tingblad	Gene Grillo	Lynell H. Forestall	October 15, 1999	213b
Johnny tries to end the feud between Bunny and Mona Herschbum, the new next door neighbor, so he can go on a date with Mona's beautiful tuba-playing daughter, Juliet "Julie" Herschbum.
26c	13c	"Clan of the Cave Boob"	Russell Calabrese	Gene Grillo & Jed Spingarn	Dave Schwartz	October 15, 1999	213c
On an archeological dig, Carl tells Johnny of what he was like as a caveman, who struggled to find a home for himself.
27a	14a	"Galaxy Boy"	Kirk Tingblad	Gene Grillo & Jed Spingarn	Alejandro Almaguer	October 22, 1999	301a
Johnny bumps into a starship captain in the park and is beamed aboard his ship. There Johnny wages war against Kharlok, the evil alien captain.
27b	14b	"Damien's Day Out"	Russell Calabrese	Gene Grillo & Jed Spingarn	Michael Diederich	October 22, 1999	301b
Johnny takes care of a little baby left on his porch, but he realizes that the baby can unleash evil powers.
27c	14c	"Noir Johnny"	Kirk Tingblad	Gene Grillo	Mary Hanley	October 22, 1999	301c
Johnny becomes a detective and takes the case of Suzy's missing doll.
28a	15a	"Hail to the Chump"	Kirk Tingblad	John Crane, Gene Grillo, & Jed Spingarn	Lynell H. Forestall	October 29, 1999	302a
When the entire town council comes down with food poisoning at the annual picnic, Johnny is given the duty of mayor.
28b	15b	"A Fool for Sister Sara"	Russell Calabrese	Gene Grillo	Dave Schwartz	October 29, 1999	302b
Sister Sara helps Johnny after a cologne-induced hallucination and tells him she would have a date with him if he is nice.
28c	15c	"Days of Blunder"	Russell Calabrese	John Crane, Gene Grillo, & Jed Spingarn	Doug Compton	October 29, 1999	302c
When Johnny takes Bunny's hot rod, Carl convinces him to enter an auto race, where Carl controls it by a joystick. When the joystick short-circuits, Johnny is left to drive on his own.
29a	16a	"Pop Art Johnny"	Kirk Tingblad	John Crane, Gene Grillo, & Jed Spingarn	Mary Hanley	November 5, 1999	303a
Johnny takes Suzy to an art museum, and Johnny becomes an artist after he makes a butt print on the wall. The fame then starts to go to his head.
29b	16b	"Dude Ranch Doofus"	Russell Calabrese	Gene Grillo	Mark Zoeller	November 5, 1999	303b
Johnny and Bunny spend a day at a dude ranch where Johnny attempts to train a horse named Diablo to win a woman's heart.
29c	16c	"A Cake Too Far"	Kirk Tingblad	Jed Spingarn and Kirk Tingblad	Charles Visser	November 5, 1999	303c
Bunny and Suzy enter a baking contest, but after Bunny accidentally injures herself playing football, Johnny has to take her place. Unfortunately, Johnny loses the recipe by accident.
30a	17a	"Look Who's Drooling"	Kirk Tingblad	John Crane and Tammy K. List	Lynell H. Forestall	November 12, 1999	304a
When Johnny takes a bite out of Pops' hot chili, he uses Carl's fountain of youth potion to cool down the flames. This makes Johnny revert to a baby until 4:00 PM, but Bunny likes the idea of Johnny being little again.
30b	17b	"Law and Disorder"	Russell Calabrese	John Crane, Jed Spingarn, & Gene Grillo	Doug Compton	November 12, 1999	304b
Johnny becomes a security guard at the mall for a power trip. Instead of stopping thieves, Johnny tries to pick up chicks and plays video games. Bunny comes to the rescue when Johnny is held hostage by a thief.
30c	17c	"Tooth or Consequences"	Russell Calabrese	Gene Grillo & Jed Spingarn	Michael Diederich	November 12, 1999	304c
Johnny poses as the Tooth Fairy after feeling guilty for telling little Suzy that she was not real. To prove that Johnny truly is the Tooth Fairy, Suzy forces him to grant her three wishes.
31a	18a	"The Unsinkable Johnny Bravo"	Kirk Tingblad	John Crane, Gene Grillo, & Jed Spingarn	Charles Visser	November 19, 1999	305a
Johnny is a poor second class peasant who falls in love with a rich first class girl named Shelia on board the lake-tour liner, the S S Muronic. The boat sinks when it hits a tin can, and Shelia breaks up with Johnny and throws the ring he gave her into the (shallow) water.
31b	18b	"Rashomoron"	Kirk Tingblad	Jed Spingarn	Alejandro Almaguer	November 19, 1999	305b
Three different variations on a story taken place in the part where everyone is hurt, told by Carl, Suzy, and Johnny.
31c	18c	"Free Pookey"	Russell Calabrese	John Crane & Gene Grillo	Dave Schwartz	November 19, 1999	305b
The annual Weasel Roundup is interrupted by a beautiful animal rights activist. She says she would think differently of Johnny if he would help animals. With the best of intentions, Johnny saves a piñata he names Pookey to return it to its native Mexico.
32a	19a	"Good Knight Johnny"	Russell Calabrese	Gene Grillo & Jed Spingarn	Doug Compton	January 7, 2000	306a
Johnny follows a hot girl dressed as a princess to a renaissance carnival. He believes that he has gone through a time portal and is really back in the Middle Ages. He attempts to impress the locals with his 20th century knowledge, only to ruin all of the events at the carnival by accident.
32b	19b	"Balloon Platoon"	Kirk Tingblad	Gene Grillo and Lynell H. Forestall	Mary Hanley	January 7, 2000	306b
After getting hit by a kid with a crush on Suzy, Johnny recruits the best that he can to overcome their evil forces.
32c	19c	"The Clueless Kid"	Russell Calabrese	Gene Grillo & Jed Spingarn	Michael Diederich	January 7, 2000	306c
Master Hamma claims the worst of his students could beat the best of his rival's. Hamma's rival takes him up on the challenge, and to protect the honor of the dojo, Johnny must utilize all he has learned to defeat the rival's student.
33a	20a	"Yukon Yutz"	Kirk Tingblad	Gene Grillo	Lynell H. Forestall	January 14, 2000	307a
Johnny and Bunny go to Canada, and Johnny attempts to get a mountie girl. He ends up catching a criminal called Will Joon Gi by accident.
33b	20b	"Prep School Johnny"	Russell Calabrese	Gene Grillo and John Crane	Dave Schwartz	January 14, 2000	307b
Johnny goes to a prep school, and three students named Nigel, Eurhart, and Piggy attempt to get him in trouble.
33c	20c	"Send in the Clones"	Russell Calabrese	Gene Grillo	Doug Compton	January 14, 2000	307c
Bunny has Johnny deliver the cable TV bill, but he accidentally goes to a mad scientist's laboratory, where he is cloned. Johnny must prove to everyone else that he is the real Johnny.
34a	21a	"Loch Ness Johnny"	Russell Calabrese	Gene Grillo & Jed Spingarn	Vaughn Tada	January 21, 2000	308a
Johnny and Bunny go to Scotland, and Johnny buys himself some haggis, causing problems when the Loch Ness Monster attempts to claim the dish for her own.
34b	21b	"Den Mother Johnny"	Kirk Tingblad	Jed Spingarn & Gene Grillo	Mary Hanley	January 21, 2000	308b
Johnny gives his mother smushweed (which she is allergic to), and Johnny has to take over Bunny's duties as den mother to Suzy's troop.
34c	21c	"Quo Doofus"	Kirk Tingblad	Gene Grillo & Jed Spingarn	Alejandro Almaguer	January 21, 2000	308c
Carl shoves Johnny through a time portal prop he bought from a TV show. The portal works, and Johnny is sent back to Ancient Rome, where he meets Julius Caesar, foils Brutus, and eventually ends up in the Coliseum. The timely eruption of Mt. Vesuvius sends Johnny back home.
35a	22a	"As I Lay Hiccupping"	Russell Calabrese	John Crane & Gene Grillo	Michael Diederich	January 28, 2000	309a
Johnny eats too quickly and gets a severe case of the hiccups. He visits a beautiful doctor who tells him that if his hiccups persist, he can come back for her hands-on treatment. To keep his hiccups going, Johnny tries to avoid the remedies of everyone in town.
35b	22b	"Marine Maroon"	Kirk Tingblad	Jed Spingarn & Gene Grillo	Charles Visser	January 28, 2000	309b
Johnny is taken to Sea Land when he is caught in a fishing net after he was sucked into the sea by a riptide. However, Johnny believes that he found the lost city of Atlantis.
35c	22c	"Thunder God Johnny"	Kirk Tingblad	Gene Grillo & Jed Spingarn	Lynell H. Forestall	January 28, 2000	309c
Johnny pulls a hammer from a block of ice and becomes a Viking god with all sorts of power. Johnny is told by the Gods that he must fight an ice giant.

=== Season 3 (2000–02) ===
No. overall	No. in season	Title	Directed by	Written by	Storyboard by	Original release date	Prod. code
36a	1a	"Luke Perry's Guide to Love"	Kirk Tingblad	Jed Spingarn	Alejandro Almaguer	August 11, 2000	310a
When Johnny saves Luke Perry's life, Luke reluctantly agrees to coach Johnny on one date, using a microscopic headphone placed in Johnny's ear.
36b	1b	"In the Line of Johnny"	Russell Calabrese	John Crane & Gene Grillo	Dave Schwartz	August 11, 2000	310b
Johnny becomes a security guard for the Soy's Harvest Parade, but he spends all his times fighting things that were actually never to happen.
36c	1c	"Fugitive Johnny"	Russell Calabrese and Kirk Tingblad	Gene Grillo	Vaughn Tada	August 11, 2000	310c
Johnny is on the run when the police believe he stole a fresh batch of chocolate chip cookies at their bakery sale.
37a	2a	"Virtual Johnny"	Kirk Tingblad	Gene Grillo and Kirk Tingblad	Mary Hanley	August 18, 2000	311a
Johnny takes Suzy to the toy store and suddenly becomes interested in the Biff Proton VR game and decides to play it. As Johnny progress through the game, his actions begin to have an effect on reality.
37b	2b	"Hold That Schmoe"	Russell Calabrese	Gene Grillo	Doug Compton	August 18, 2000	311b
Knowing that it will sell millions, Johnny attempts to get the first issue of "Man Bean, the Bean That Walks Like a Man". The comic is guarded by a ghost, and Johnny and Carl attempt to take it on—Ghostbusters style.
37c	2c	"Hunted!"	Kirk Tingblad	John Crane & Gene Grillo	TBA	August 18, 2000	311c
Bunny gambles Johnny away to Colonel Fatman, where Johnny is forced to be hunted. But when it comes to hunting down Johnny, he is no professional in hiding!
38a	3a	"Candidate Johnny"	Kirk Tingblad	John Crane, Gene Grillo, & Jed Spingarn	Drew Graybeal	September 1, 2000	312a
Johnny and Carl both run for Litter Commissioner to pick up girls.
38b	3b	"Air Bravo"	Kirk Tingblad	Gene Grillo & Jed Spingarn	Michael Diederich	September 1, 2000	312b
Johnny meets Enormous Ferguson, the famous basketball player. Johnny wants to help Ferguson and the Pogatuck Ferrets take on the Townsville Titans.
38c	3c	"Johnny B. Badd"	Kirk Tingblad	John Crane, Gene Grillo, & Jed Spingarn	Lynell H. Forestall	September 1, 2000	312c
Suzy's "Funky Monkey" song is a hit with the neighbors. Pops decides to make Suzy, Carl, and Bunny stars, but Johnny wants to be the lead singer. Pops cuts his microphone chord to make things safe.
39a	4a	"Scoop Bravo"	Kirk Tingblad	John Crane & Gene Grillo	Alejandro Almaguer	September 8, 2000	313a
To impress a beautiful newspaper editor, Johnny attempts to follow a story that proves cats are actually aliens from outer space.
39b	4b	"The Incredible Shrinking Johnny"	Kirk Tingblad	Gene Grillo & Jed Spingarn	Dave Schwartz	September 8, 2000	313b
Johnny begins shrinking after a mysterious person casts a spell on him.
39c	4c	"Backdaft"	Kirk Tingblad	John Crane, Gene Grillo, & Jed Spingarn	Charles Visser	September 8, 2000	313c
Johnny signs up to be a fireman to impress girls, but he cannot do anything right.
40a	5a	"The Johnny Bravo Affair"	Kirk Tingblad	Gene Grillo	Vaughn Tada	September 22, 2000	401a
Johnny falls asleep in a mummy casket and is awoken when a cat burglar attempts to steal the world's largest piece of cubic zirconia. After Johnny accidentally eats it, he is kidnapped and taken back to her place (to his excitement), where Bunny saves Johnny.
40b	5b	"Biosphere Johnny"	Kirk Tingblad	Gene Grillo & Jed Spingarn	Mary Hanley	September 22, 2000	401b
Johnny locks himself in the biosphere with a pretty lady scientist, Carl, and others, where he destroys all of their resources.
40c	5c	"Spa Spaz"	Kirk Tingblad	John Crane, Gene Grillo, & Jed Spingarn	Doug Compton	September 22, 2000	401c
Johnny checks into a spa to get pampered and meet hot chicks. The manager sees how many toxins are in Johnny's system and decides that she will take him as her project that will "put her spa on the map".
41a	6a	"Fool for a Day"	Kirk Tingblad	John Crane, Gene Grillo, & Jed Spingarn	Michael Diederich	October 13, 2000	402a
After being the butt of everyone's April Fool's jokes (including Suzy's class), Johnny thinks of a way to get revenge on their teacher, but when he does, it is not April Fool's anymore, and the teacher beats him up.
41b	6b	"In Your Dreams"	Kirk Tingblad	Gene Grillo & Jed Spingarn	Lynell H. Forestall	October 13, 2000	402b
Johnny finally meets the girl of his dreams, due to the fact it really is a dream, causing things to go awry when he keeps dreaming things to go wrong.
41c	6c	"Some Like It Stupid"	Kirk Tingblad	Gene Grillo & Jed Spingarn	Dave Schwartz	October 13, 2000	402c
On the run from Fish Lips Malone, Johnny and Carl disguise themselves as women for the Miss Perky beauty pageant.
42a	7a	"Dental Hijinks"	Kirk Tingblad	Jed Spingarn & Gene Grillo	Doug Compton	November 3, 2000	403a
Johnny has to go to the dentist because of a toothache, but he tries to escape.
42b	7b	"Little Red Riding Johnny"	Kirk Tingblad	Gene Grillo	Troy Adomitis	November 3, 2000	403b
Johnny is trying to get Squid Ringo's tungsten knuckles, but they do not have any more of Krelmann's Prune Spread. Johnny thinks that Suzy is taking some to her grandmother in the woods.
42c	7c	"Pouch Potato"	Kirk Tingblad	Gene Grillo & Jed Spingarn	Alejandro Almaguer	November 3, 2000	403c
After being kicked off an outback tour, Johnny is adopted by a mother kangaroo. He is an outcast until he defends the herd from the infamous Boomerang Caine.
43a	8a	"Jurassic Dork"	Kirk Tingblad	Paul Kozlowsky & Gene Grillo	Lynell H. Forestall	November 17, 2000	404a
Johnny gets his hands on a real prehistoric dinosaur egg, which hatches. Johnny thinks that the dinosaur is a hamster, and he must keep his new pet (named Mr. Wuggles) from wreaking havoc in Anytown.
43b	8b	"Mascot Academy"	Kirk Tingblad	Paul Kozlowsky, Jed Spingarn, & Gene Grillo	Alejandro Almaguer	November 17, 2000	404b
Johnny wants to be admired by football cheerleaders, but he has no chance of being a player. Instead, he joins the Mascot Academy as a "stinky fish head" to get the cheerleaders to go out with him.
43c	8c	"Full Metal Johnny"	Kirk Tingblad	Gene Grillo	Vaughn Tada	November 17, 2000	404c
While applying for dodgeball camp, Johnny accidentally signs up for the army and has to deal with the roughest drill instructor ever, Sergeant Trixie.
44a	9a	"Johnny on Ice!"	Kirk Tingblad	Paul Kozlowski, Gene Grillo, & Jed Spingarn	Alejandro Almaguer	November 17, 2000	405a
While on a trip to the mountains, Johnny is frozen and thawed out by a scientist who thinks that he is a primitive caveman. Upon catching a glimpse of the scientist's lovely daughter, Johnny plays along.
44b	9b	"Robo-Mama"	Kirk Tingblad	Paul F. Kozlowski, Gene Grillo, & Jed Spingarn	Troy Adomitis	November 17, 2000	405b
When Bunny has to go away to Vegas for a Bingo tournament, leaving Johnny by himself for a few days, she gets a mail-order robot mother to replace her.
44c	9c	"20,000 Leagues Over My Head"	Kirk Tingblad	Gene Grillo & Jed Spingarn	Lynell H. Forestall	November 17, 2000	405c
While searching for Clam-League 9000 toys, Johnny works with an environmentalist named Debbie to save fishes.
45a	10a	"I Dream of Johnny"	Kirk Tingblad	Gene Grillo, Paul F. Kozlowski, & Jed Spingarn	Dave Schwartz	December 15, 2000	406a
Johnny finds a magic lamp and is given three wishes.
45b	10b	"One Angry Bravo"	Nathan Chew	Gene Grillo & Jed Spingarn	Michael Diederich	December 15, 2000	406b
Johnny is forced into jury service.
45c	10c	"Carnival of the Darned"	Nathan Chew	Gene Grillo	Vaughn Tada	December 15, 2000	406c
Johnny becomes the star attraction at the circus when he runs away from home.
46a	11a	"A Walk on the Stupid Side"	Kirk Tingblad	Paul F. Kozlowski, Gene Grillo, & Jed Spingarn	Mary Hanley	February 2, 2001	407a
Suzy convinces Johnny to walk for charity. After accidentally walking around the world, they must stop him or else with their donations they will need to pay billions of dollars.
46b	11b	"Lone Star Bravo"	Kirk Tingblad	Gene Grillo, Jed Spingarn, and Paul F. Kozlowski	Alejandro Almaguer	February 2, 2001	407b
While looking at the family scrapbook, Mama tells Johnny the tale of Lonestar Bravo and how he became the sheriff of Moist Rock to impress frontier chicks.
46c	11c	"Enter the Chipmunk"	Nathan Chew	Gene Grillo, Paul F. Kozlowski, & Jed Spingarn	Doug Compton	February 2, 2001	407c
When a chipmunk falls in Johnny's shirt during a karate match and ends up leveling everyone, his master's rival is so impressed he kidnaps Johnny until he will teach him his move.
47a	12a	"The Great Bunny Book Ban"	Kirk Tingblad and Dave Schwartz	Jed Spingarn, Gene Grillo, and Paul F. Kozlowski	Lynell H. Forestall	February 23, 2001	408a
The "Harold and the Fuzzy Bunny Book" has been taken off all library shelves by a greedy censorer named Mr. Blowhart, and Suzy must make him change his mind.
47b	12b	"Toy Boy Johnny"	Nathan Chew	Paul F. Kozlowski, Gene Grillo, & Jed Spingarn	Alejandro Almaguer	February 23, 2001	408b
Johnny is named CEO of a major toy conglomerate and invents (defective) action figures of himself for the holiday season.
47c	12c	"Frankenbravo"	Kirk Tingblad	Gene Grillo, Paul F. Kozlowski, & Jed Spingarn	Gary Hartle	February 23, 2001	408c
Johnny meets a mad scientist who has made the perfect female monster, and she and Johnny are on the run from an angry mob.
48a	13a	"Lodge Brother Johnny"	Nathan Chew	Gene Grillo, Paul F. Kozlowski, & Jed Spingarn	Michael Diederich	April 6, 2001	409a
When Johnny agrees to take the initiation trial for the "Brotherhood of the Gnu", a fraternity that Pops and Carl are members of, he must face the daunting tasks of eating one potato chip and listening to Brother Ernie's unnecessarily long story of buying a new couch.
48b	13b	"Chain Gang Johnny"	Nathan Chew	Gene Grillo, Paul F. Kozlowski, & Jed Spingarn	Vaughn Tada	April 6, 2001	409b
Johnny and Carl get arrested and try to escape from jail.
48c	13c	"Lumberjack Johnny"	Kirk Tingblad	John Crane, Gene Grillo, & Jed Spingarn	Lynell H. Forestall	April 6, 2001	409c
Johnny becomes a lumberjack.
49a	14a	"Lord of the Links"	Kirk Tingblad	John Crane, Gene Grillo, & Jed Spingarn	Alejandro Almaguer	April 27, 2001	410a
Johnny becomes a golfer to earn money.
49b	14b	"Bootman"	Kirk Tingblad	Paul F. Kozlowski, Gene Grillo, & Jed Spingarn	Mary Hanley	April 27, 2001	410b
When the Green Swoosh (a Green Lantern-like superhero) gets injured by a falling meteor, Johnny gets his super boots, the source of his power. Armed with super strength and speed, Johnny tries his hand at being a superhero.
49c	14c	"Freudian Dip"	Nathan Chew	Gene Grillo, Paul F. Kozlowski, & Jed Spingarn	Dave Schwartz	April 27, 2001	410c
Johnny keeps having horrible nightmares about a monster, and it is driving Mama crazy. Suzy, armed with a degree in psychology she earned over the internet, decides to psychoanalyze Johnny and find the root of his terrifying dreams.
50a	15a	"Auteur! Auteur!"	Nathan Chew	Gene Grillo, Paul F. Kozlowski, & Jed Spingarn	Doug Compton	May 11, 2001	411a
Johnny is a film director, writer, and a star of a new movie that he created using a $7 million arts grant from the government of the United States of America.
50b	15b	"Runaway Train"	Kirk Tingblad	Paul F. Kozlowski, Gene Grillo, & Jed Spingarn	TBA	May 11, 2001	411b
Johnny mistakenly boards the Blue Goose 9000, a supersonic train prototype, instead of a commuter train heading to visit his aunt.
50c	15c	"A Reject Runs Through It"	Nathan Chew	Gene Grillo, Paul F. Kozlowski, & Jed Spingarn	Michael Diederich	May 11, 2001	411c
Carl and Pops dare Johnny to travel to Alaska and catch a rare fish, the "sassy-mouth salmon".
51a	16a	"The Island of Mrs. Morceau"	Nathan Chew	Gene Grillo, Paul F. Kozlowski, & Jed Spingarn	Vaughn Tada	June 7, 2002	412a
After traveling to an island to meet babes, Johnny is turned into half-man, half-hamster. Enraged by this, Johnny vows to destroy the mutating machine.
51b	16b	"The Color of Mustard"	Kirk Tingblad	Gene Grillo, Paul F. Kozlowski, & Jed Spingarn	Mary Hanley	June 7, 2002	412b
Johnny has retired from professional badminton because of a courtside accident, but after being challenged by a pretty girl and a prize of a date with her, he quickly agrees to a match.
51c	16c	"Third Dork from the Sun"	Nathan Chew	Gene Grillo, Paul F. Kozlowski, & Jed Spingarn	Dave Schwartz	June 7, 2002	412b
Johnny is sucked into an alien game show by an alien civilization. He wins the first two rounds and competes in a game called "Suck My Brain Out".
52a	17a	"The Hansel & Gretel Project"	Kirk Tingblad	Jed Spingarn, Gene Grillo, and Paul F. Kozlowski	Lynell H. Forestall	June 14, 2002	413a
Little Suzy and Carl convince Johnny to help them make a movie about the Hansel and Gretel witch who lives at the edge of town.
52b	17b	"I.Q. Johnny"	Kirk Tingblad	Jed Spingarn	Alejandro Almaguer	June 14, 2002	413b
Johnny buys a drink designed to make chimps smart. This makes Johnny smart just in time to save the town during a nuclear meltdown.
52c	17c	"Get Stinky!"	Nathan Chew	Gene Grillo, Paul F. Kozlowski, & Jed Spingarn	Alejandro Almaguer, Michael Diederich, Mary Hanley, Dave Schwartz, Vaughn Tada, and Lynell H. Forestall	June 14, 2002	413c
Johnny's childhood nemesis, Stinky Brownstein, moves back to town. She is now very beautiful and actually interested in him, but he is unable to see past the memories of all the practical jokes she played on him when they were children.

=== Specials (2001–03) ===
Title	Directed by	Written by	Storyboard by	Original release date	Prod. code
"A Johnny Bravo Christmas"	Robert Alvarez and Van Partible	Van Partible	Vaughn Tada and Brian Kindregan	December 7, 2001	S01
Johnny forgets to send a letter to Santa Claus and must reach the North Pole before Christmas. When the post office tells him there is no way to get the letters to the North Pole, Johnny journeys to the North Pole himself. Unsure of where Santa lives, he agrees to take little Suzy along with him. They at first become stowaways on a plane, but after getting dropped out along with circus animals, Suzy contacts a trucker to give them a ride to the airport. There they get a lift going towards the North Pole, along the way picking up the infamous Donny Osmond.
"It's Valentine's Day, Johnny Bravo!"	Robert Alvarez & Van Partible	Van Partible	Dan Haskett and Vaughn Tada	February 14, 2003	S02
In celebration of Valentine's Day, which is also Johnny's birthday, Johnny invites everyone as he goes out in search of the perfect date. However, it seems that his mother had already arranged a date for him. Refusing to go with a girl his mother decided for him, he goes out on his own. Despite all his attempts, every single woman rejects him as usual, and he becomes deeply depressed at the worst birthday in his life. Ultimately he ends up running into the woman his mother arranged for him, and she turns out to be an attractive, buxom redhead who, for all intents and purposes, is similar to Johnny in many ways. They end up going on a fantastic date, and Johnny decides that this was his best birthday ever.

=== Season 4 (2004) ===
No. overall	No. in season	Title	Directed by	Written by	Storyboard by	Original release date	Prod. code
53	1	"Johnny Bravo Goes to Hollywood"	Robert Alvarez & Van Partible	Van Partible & Craig Lewis	Dan Haskett & Vaughn Tada	February 20, 2004	501
Johnny Bravo is offered a role in the upcoming movie "Lunch Lady S'urprise" and will get to star with Don Knotts, Jessica Biel, a Hobbit, and Alec Baldwin. When his part gets written out of the script, he tries desperately to squeeze a few more seconds out of his 15 minutes of fame.
54a	2a	"Traffic Troubles"	Robert Alvarez & Van Partible	Craig Bartlett	Vaughn Tada	March 5, 2004	502a
A jaywalking incident lands Johnny in "Musical Comedy Traffic School". Unfortunately, Johnny cannot sing a note, and he seeks the help of a kindly old lady in figuring out how to make the grade and impress the Token Spunky Girl.
54b	2b	"My Funny Looking Friend"	James Tim Walker & Van Partible	Craig Lewis	Alex Almaguer	March 5, 2004	502b
Inspired by the antics of a fellow macho-man at the mall, Johnny enlists the aid of a funny-looking friend to impress girls. After looking high and low for the perfect funny-looking friend, Johnny finds a pro who knows how to reel in the chicks.
55a	3a	"Win an El Toro Guapo"	Robert Alvarez & Van Partible	Craig Bartlett	Jim Schumann	March 12, 2004	503a
Johnny tries to enter a contest to win an "El Toro Guapo" pick-up truck, and he must outlast a host of competitors in holding on to a rather talkative bull.
55b	3b	"Witch-ay Woman"	Robert Alvarez & Van Partible	Amy Keating Rogers	Dan Haskett & Charlie Bean	March 12, 2004	503b
Johnny gets on the bad side of a gypsy lady with his clumsy passes, and she casts a spell on him, turning him into a woman ("Jenny Brava").
56	4	"Home Alone"	James Tim Walker & Van Partible	Craig Lewis	Vaughn Tada & Alex Almaguer	March 19, 2004	404
Mama Bravo goes out of town on vacation, and Johnny convinces her to let him stay home alone for the week. Things do not go as well as Johnny would have hoped, as one disaster after another strikes his home, culminating in a band of fairy tale creatures storming into his house and throwing a wild party.
57a	5a	"Mini JB"	Robert Alvarez & Van Partible	Amy Keating Rogers	Octavio E. Rodriguez	March 26, 2004	405a
Johnny finds himself stuck looking after a baby boy and decides to teach the kid to be more like him in order to make the situation bearable. Much to his surprise, the ladies are quite smitten with what they believe to be a father-son duo, and Johnny plans on using the kid as a babe magnet.
57b	5b	"Back from the Future"	Robert Alvarez & Van Partible	Craig Bartlett	Jim Schumann	March 26, 2004	505b
After Johnny is knocked out by a woman he was flirting with, a band of sci-fi geeks find a dazed Johnny and become convinced he is a time traveler from 1963.
58a	6a	"That's Entertainment!"	Kevin Petrilak & Van Partible	Van Partible	Vaughn Tada	July 2, 2004	506a
When the Bravos' TV breaks on movie night, Mama suggests that she, Johnny, Little Suzy, and Donny Osmond (who shows up later on) take turns telling stories to keep themselves entertained.
58b	6b	"Non, Oui, Oui Pour Johnny"	David Brain & Van Partible	Amy Keating Rogers	Alex Almaguer	July 2, 2004	506b
Johnny takes up French class with Mama for their upcoming trip to Paris, France, but Johnny is a slow learner.
59a	7a	"Get Shovelized"	Robert Alvarez & Van Partible	Craig Lewis	Octavio E. Rodriguez	July 9, 2004	507a
Johnny orders a seemingly complex work-out device over the phone, which turns out to be a rusty, worn-out shovel.
59b	7b	"T Is for Trouble"	James Tim Walker & Van Partible	Craig Lewis	Jim Schumann	July 9, 2004	507b
Mr. T pays Johnny a visit to teach him about self-defense.
60a	8a	"Gray Matters"	Robert Alvarez & Van Partible	Amy Keating Rogers	Vaughn Tada	July 16, 2004	508a
Johnny freaks out when he awakens with a gray hair.
60b	8b	"Double Vision"	James Tim Walker & Van Partible	Craig Bartlett	Alex Almaguer	July 16, 2004	508b
Johnny goes home from the grocery store with a look-alike of his mother.
61a	9a	"It's a Magical Life"	Robert Alvarez & Van Partible	Craig Bartlett	Octavio E. Rodriguez	July 23, 2004	509a
Johnny believes a magician makes him invisible.
61b	9b	"The Hunk at the End of This Cartoon"	James Tim Walker & Van Partible	Craig Lewis	Jim Schumann	July 23, 2004	509b
Johnny fears the new hunk in town.
62a	10a	"The Time of My Life"	James Tim Walker & Van Partible	Story by : Amy Keating Rogers; Teleplay by : Van Partible	Vaughn Tada	July 30, 2004	510a
Johnny tells Suzy a story about his first crush, and how he went from skinny to muscular.
62b	10b	"Run Johnny Run"	Robert Alvarez & Van Partible	Craig Bartlett	Alex Almaguer	July 30, 2004	510b
Johnny has to make it to his blind date in time, but when he fails the first time, he grabs the remote and restarts the cartoon.
63a	11a	"Wilderness Protection Program"	James Tim Walker & Van Partible	Adam Pava	Octavio E. Rodriguez	August 6, 2004	511a
A moose pretends that she and Johnny are married elephants because she is on the run from people she thinks are a mob out to take over the world.
63b	11b	"A Page Right Out of History"	James Tim Walker & Van Partible	Amy Keating Rogers & Craig Bartlett	Jim Schumann	August 6, 2004	511b
In the distant past, a same-named ancestor of Johnny living in Bedrock is rescued by Fred Flintstone and soon finds himself doing Fred's chores as a way of repaying Fred.
64a	12a	"Some Walk by Night"	Robert Alvarez & Van Partible	Van Partible	Vaughn Tada	August 20, 2004	512a
Johnny ends up on a reality TV show as a detective.
64b	12b	"Adam West's Date-O-Rama"	James Tim Walker & Van Partible	Craig Lewis	Alex Almaguer	August 20, 2004	512b
Johnny is on a dating show and gets a blind date with the Black Widow.
65a	13a	"Johnny Makeover"	Robert Alvarez & Van Partible	Adam Pava	Dan Haskett & Octavio E. Rodriguez	August 27, 2004	513a
Johnny Bravo becomes the target of Don Knotts, "Weird Al" Yankovic, and the Blue Falcon for their reality show, Cartoon Makeover. The trio attempts to completely revamp him to make him a huge hit for the new youth generation, but their tactics only make things worse for Johnny.
65b	13b	"Back on Shaq"	James Tim Walker & Van Partible	Story by : Amy Keating Rogers; Teleplay by : Van Partible	Jim Schumann	August 27, 2004	513b
At a basketball game, Shaquille O'Neal discovers that Johnny Bravo brings him good luck. This holds true until Shaq's showdown match with Seth Green who has brought along his own good luck charm by the name of Huckleberry Hound.

=== Television film (2009) ===
On June 28, 2009, an episode titled Johnny Bravo Goes to Bollywood (not to be confused with the 2011 TV movie of the same name) was aired in India. It was created exclusively for the Indian market, and produced by Famous House of Animation in Mumbai. The show's creator, Van Partible, was the only American involved throughout the entire production. The episode can be found with English subtitles, as an extra feature, on the region 4 season 2 DVD released in Australia on December 10, 2009.

Title	Directed by	Written by	Storyboard by	Original release date
"Johnny Bravo Goes to Bollywood"	E. Suresh	Van Partible, E. Suresh, Keegan Pinto, and Keith Menon	Van Partible, Orlon Ross, Silas Hickey, and E. Suresh	November 4, 2011
After watching a True Hollywood Stories-type documentary in which he is considered a forgotten star, Johnny Bravo travels to Mumbai, the entertainment capital of India, to prove himself he is still popular, confusing Bollywood, India, with Hollywood and Indiana respectively. Eventually Johnny finds himself in the middle of a murder plot to kill Bollywood's greatest star, Jiggy (Johnny's Indian equivalent and rival).
