= Johnny Bravo Goes to Bollywood =

2011 film by Van Partible

- Promotional poster
- Based on: Johnny Bravo by Van Partible
- Written by: Van Partible; Shayne Armstrong; Shane Krause
- Directed by: Van Partible
- Starring: Jeff Bennett; Mark DeCarlo; Jyotsna Du Ciel; Cree Summer; Tom Kenny; Tabitha Kumar; Sunil Malhotra; Ajay Mehta; Sharon Muthu; Sheetal Sheth; Tara Strong; Amir Talai; Brenda Vaccaro
- Composer: Lou Fagenson
- Countries of origin: India; United States
- Original language: English

Production
- Executive producers: Silas Hickey; Rick Fernandes; Mark Eyers
- Producers: Van Partible; Silas Hickey; Andrew Ooi; CJ See
- Editor: Paul Douglas
- Running time: 66 minutes
- Production company: Cartoon Network Studios

Original release
- Network: Cartoon Network
- Release: 4 November 2011

Johnny Bravo Goes to Bollywood is a 2011 animated comedy television film based on the animated television series Johnny Bravo created by Van Partible. It premiered on Cartoon Network in Australia and New Zealand on November 4, 2011.

The movie was originally an 11-minute short done by Partible in Mumbai at Famous House of Animation. It was originally created for a strictly Indian audience, and the full short was done completely in Hindi and Dub in English. It aired on June 28, 2009 on Cartoon Network India. The following year, the short was lengthened to 78 minutes, and was done completely in English and Hindi to be aired globally.

== Plot ==
After watching a True Hollywood Stories-type documentary in which he is considered a forgotten star, Johnny Bravo and his helper monkey Jeeves travel to Mumbai, the entertainment capital of India, to prove himself he is still popular, confusing Bollywood, India, with Hollywood and Indiana respectively. Eventually Johnny finds himself in the middle of a murder plot to kill Bollywood's greatest star, Jiggy (Johnny's Indian equivalent and rival).

== Cast ==
- Jeff Bennett as Johnny Bravo
- Brenda Vaccaro as Bunny Bravo
- Tara Strong as additional voices
- Sunil Malhotra as Jiggy
- Sheetal Sheth as Sumi Shark
- Ajay Mehta as Bollywood Producer
- Tom Kenny as additional voices
- Cree Summer as additional Voices
- Mark DeCarlo as Jeeves

== See also ==
- List of Cartoon Network films
