= List of My Gym Partner's a Monkey episodes =

My Gym Partner's a Monkey is an American animated television series created by Julie McNally-Cahill and Timothy Cahill (the latter is also the director of all episodes) for Cartoon Network. The series aired from December 26, 2005 to November 27, 2008 for a total of four seasons and 56 episodes (not including shorts).

== Series overview ==
Season	Segments	Episodes	Originally released	
Season	Segments	Episodes	First released	Last released
Pilot			2003	
1	25	13	December 26, 2005	May 26, 2006
2	25	13	June 8, 2006	January 5, 2007
Shorts	—N/a	13	September 9, 2006	
3	27	15	January 12, 2007	August 31, 2007
4	25	15	September 17, 2007	November 27, 2008

== Episodes ==
=== Pilot (2003) ===
My Gym Partner's a Monkey had one pilot created for Cartoon Network by Julie and Timothy Cahill, one made in late 2003 shared the same name of the TV series.

Title	Original release date
"My Gym Partner's a Monkey"	2003
Adam Lyon attends Charles Darwin Middle School because his last name is "Lion".

=== Season 1 (2005–06) ===
No. overall	No. in season	Title	Written by	Storyboard by	Original release date	Prod. code
1a	1a	"Inoculation Day"	Tom Sheppard	Rossen Varbanov	December 26, 2005	TBA
On School Vaccination Day, Adam is inadvertently hit with a vial of "monkey virus" intended for Jake. He soon devolves into a crazed ape, forcing Jake to lead Principal Pixiefrog, Coach Gills, and Nurse Gazelle on a hunt to restore him to normal.
1b	1b	"Animal Testing"	Julie McNally-Cahill and Timothy Cahill	William Reiss	December 26, 2005	
A high score in the school placement test puts Adam in Mr. Blowhole's class where he is teased by the Spiffies at first, but he is soon respected by them when they see his excellent spelling skills.
2a	2a	"Lyon of Scrimmage"	Julie McNally-Cahill and Timothy Cahill	William Reiss	February 24, 2006	
Coach Gills teams Adam and Jake as one player for the Charles Darwin middle school football team when Adam displays excellent memory at the game play and Jake displays his good arm for tossing.
2b	2b	"Bad News Bear"	Julie McNally-Cahill and Timothy Cahill	William Reiss	February 24, 2006	
After Adam and Jake break a fish tube, Jake's consequence is to work in the school office filing papers, while Adam's punishment is to guide an endangered panda, Dingbang, around the school.
3a	3a	"Chew on This"	Tom Sheppard	Kelsey Mann	February 24, 2006	
Adam literally cannot stomach the thought of eating the lunch menu at Charles Darwin Middle School, and Principal Pixiefrog agrees to provide human food as a substitute to avoid a lawsuit. When all of the animals get hooked on the food, they bloat to a massive size and force Adam to take drastic measures to break their addiction.
3b	3b	"The 'A' Word"	Roger Eschbacher	Nate Cash	February 24, 2006	
Jake is offended after Adam complains that Bull Sharkowski "went ape" on him, so Adam tries to make up to him, though Jake keeps refusing the apologies.
4a	4a	"Shark Attack"	Julie McNally-Cahill and Timothy Cahill	Kelsey Mann	March 3, 2006	
When Adam accidentally hits resident bully Bull Sharkowski's snout, he is dubbed as the new school bully.
4b	4b	"Me Adam, You Jake"	Julie McNally-Cahill and Timothy Cahill	William Reiss	March 3, 2006	
Miss Chameleon thinks that Jake should have the role of Jungle Guy (a parody of Tarzan) but Adam wants the role also.
5a	5a	"The Sheds"	Roger Eschbacher	Chong Suk Lee	March 10, 2006	
Slips the green tree python is shedding his old skin but everyone thinks it is a virus he is spreading around the school called the AAACCCK.
5b	5b	"Shiny Thing"	Tom Sheppard	Kirk Tingblad	March 10, 2006	
Jake breaks a cardinal CDMS rule when he brings a shiny glass doorknob to class, and discovers why such items are banned—they make any animal who sees them fall into a hypnotic trance. Jake soon begins abusing his power and becomes a mad dictator who forces everyone to study at the Jake Spidermonkey Center for the Study of Monkey Butts, and it's up to Adam to fight back and save the school.
6a	6a	"Amazon Kevin"	Tom Sheppard	Nate Cash	March 17, 2006	
Amazon Kevin from Adam's favorite T.V. show, Amazon Kevin's Wild Animal Takedown, comes as a surprise guest to the school, though the animal students hate him due to him beating up animals on the show.
6b	6b	"Grub Drive"	Tom Sheppard	Kelsey Mann	March 17, 2006	
There is a textbook shortage and to raise money to buy new books, Adam and Jake try to sell chocolate-covered grubs during Charles Darwin Middle School's annual school sales drive.
7a	7a	"Law and Odor"	Tom Sheppard	Rossen Varbanov	March 24, 2006	
After receiving a number of citations, Adam and Jake are put on hall monitor duty, and Adam discovers the corruption of the hall monitor students.
7b	7b	"Yesterday's Funny Monkey"	Tom Sheppard	William Reiss	March 24, 2006	
Jake becomes the school's class clown after his talking buttocks routine is a success.
8a	8a	"It's the Scary Old Custodian, Adam Lyon"	Roger Eschbacher	Kirk Tingblad	April 7, 2006	
On Howloween, Adam goes into the boiler room to get a file for Principal Pixiefrog, and discovers the ghost of an old human janitor.
8b	8b	"My Science Project"	Tom Sheppard	Chong Suk Lee	April 7, 2006	
Jake makes up for semi-intentionally ruining Adam's science fair project by implanting a robotic arm in his skull that starts to have a mind of its own.
9a	9a	"Two Tons of Fun"	Roger Eschbacher	William Reiss	April 14, 2006	
Adam and Jake discover unsent love letters to Mrs. Tusk by Mr. Hornbill, and they decide to coach him to ask Mrs. Tusk out on a date.
9b	9b	"Docu-Trauma"	Tom Sheppard	Rossen Varbanov	April 14, 2006	
Zira Cornelius, a famous documentary filmmaker, comes to Charles Darwin Middle School and focuses on Adam, believing him to be an unknown species, unknowing he's a human boy with a zit, swollen nose, and muddy clothes (due to a bad start that morning).
10a	10a	"Supplies Party"	Roger Eschbacher	Rossen Varbanov	April 21, 2006	
Adam is celebrating his birthday party at Piggy Porker's Pizza Palace, but when his human and animal friends both show up, he has to find ways to keep them apart or else will be embarrassed.
10b	10b	"She's Koala That"	Tom Sheppard	Chong Suk Lee	April 21, 2006	
Adam befriends a koala named Deidre out of pity, who turns out to annoy him as much as she annoys everyone else.
11a	11a	"Political Animals"	Roger Eschbacher and Tom Sheppard	Kelsey Mann	April 28, 2006	
Adam enters the school elections and faces off against seemingly powerful Bull Sharkowski.
11b	11b	"Guano in 60 Seconds"	Adam Pava	Nate Cash	April 28, 2006	
When Charles Darwin Middle School is closed due to bat guano contamination, school is held in a portable classroom. Problems start when Jake accidentally snaps the brake and the portable classroom wheels across various places.
12a	12a	"Bubble or Nothing"	Adam Pava	William Reiss	May 12, 2006	
After being played around by three lions, Adam tells the nurse he is allergic to some of the animals. Principal Pixiefrog puts Adam in a plastic bubble, and it becomes the latest fad at school.
12b	12b	"Up All Night"	Roger Eschbacher	Chong Suk Lee	May 12, 2006	
Adam's excited when Kerry invites him to play paintball early the next morning, but can't sleep when Windsor, Jake and Slips show up for a sleepover uninvited.
13	13	"Kerry to Dance?"	Adam Pava	Rossen Varbanov	May 26, 2006	
Adam wants to ask Kerry to the school dance; Jake is shocked Adam doesn't want to go with him, and Ingrid thinks Adam wants to ask her to the dance. Meanwhile, Henry Armadillo seeks James Ant's help to find a date. Note: This is a full-length special.

=== Season 2 (2006–07) ===
No. overall	No. in season	Title	Written by	Storyboard by	Original release date
14a	1a	"Le Switcheroo"	Tom Sheppard	Kelsey Mann	June 8, 2006
Mr. Mandrill suggests that Adam and Coach Gills switch roles for the day after Coach Gills loses her temper over Adam's performance in her class.
14b	1b	"I Got a New Aptitude"	Adam Pava	Sherm Cohen	June 8, 2006
Adam and Jake take an aptitude test, but they are not happy with their results. So they try to find their true destiny.
15a	2a	"Cheer Pressure"	Tom Sheppard	Nate Cash	June 19, 2006
The Charles Darwin Jungle Squad wants Adam to cheer with them at the extreme cheerleading finals after Dickie Sugarjumper injures his leg.
15b	2b	"Basic Jake"	Roger Eschbacher	William Reiss	June 19, 2006
After Jake dumps a chum bucket on Principal Pixiefrog and assumed he and Adam did it, he gives them Saturday detention, only for Jake to do his basic cable variety show, Basic Jake.
16a	3a	"The Times, They Are Exchangin'"	Adam Pava	Chong Suk Lee	July 19, 2006
Adam gets to go back to his old school as part of an exchange program. However, the school is not exactly the same as he remembers it.
16b	3b	"Cool Kids"	Roger Eschbacher	William Reiss	July 19, 2006
In the refrigerated part of the school where students are taking their polar classes, Jake starts hanging out with a bunch of "cool kids" and forgets about his other friends.
17a	4a	"Disregarding Henry"	Adam Pava	Kelsey Mann	July 31, 2006
When Jake is banned from the talent show, due to his bubble gum performing last year, he enters Henry Armadillo into the show after hearing his poorly singing, thinking it's good.
17b	4b	"Nice Moustache"	Tom Sheppard	Sherm Cohen	July 31, 2006
Jake wakes up with what appears to be a large, bushy mustache and it changes his life as he assumes he becomes a "man" by having it.
18a	5a	"Poop Scoop"	Tom Sheppard	Nate Cash	August 8, 2006
No one is reading the school newspaper and it is closing down. So Adam suggests that they write an interesting story. Trouble starts when Jake publishes lies about Adam. Things get edgy when Adam publishes Jake's secret.
18b	5b	"Leaf of Absence"	Roger Eschbacher	William Reiss	August 8, 2006
When the school gets sued, Principal Pixiefrog takes time off from work. His replacement is Principal Wolverine, a principal (who is always shown squinting) who is making things miserable for the students, and even Ms. Warthog. Plus, he has an obsession with biting people on the butt, saying "Do I have to bite you on the buttocks?" as a threat towards students. So Adam and Jake attempt to persuade Principal Pixiefrog to come back to his old job.
19a	6a	"I Fear Pretties"	Adam Pava	Chong Suk Lee	August 15, 2006
When Adam tells Margaret Rhino that she is rare, she becomes so arrogant that her friends, Joanie and Latanya, get angry at her. But when Adam learns the truth about Margaret, he tries to tell them and has no choice but to take all three of them to a date.
19b	6b	"Magic Fish"	Roger Eschbacher	William Reiss	August 15, 2006
After finding a stranded fish, Adam is granted a magic fish wish. Adam thinks this is nonsense while his friends want him to use the wish on them.
20a	7a	"Ain't Too Proud to Egg"	Adam Pava	Kelsey Mann	August 21, 2006
Adam, Jake and other students are given eggs that they have to take care of for a school assignment. Of course, Adam gets stuck doing all the work for Jake, and finds that this responsibility is too much for him.
20b	7b	"The Two Jakes"	Tom Sheppard	Sherm Cohen	August 21, 2006
Jake gets clones for himself and Adam, but are mean jerks. They are ruining their records/reputations by running around the school naked and causing chaos.
21a	8a	"Jake's Day Off"	Roger Eschbacher	Nate Cash	August 31, 2006
Jake takes a day off from school by spending it at school as part of his typical Jake fashion. He enjoys the facilities and persuades Adam to join him.
21b	8b	"Lupe in Love"	Tom Sheppard	William Reiss	August 31, 2006
Lupe falls in love with Orlando Parrot, a parrot who is Jake's friend, who usually calls her "pretty bird", but finds out that he doesn't actually like her at all.
22	9	"Have Yourself a Joyful Little Animas"	Adam Pava	Sherm Cohen and Brett Varon	September 10, 2006
Animas is a celebration for animals and their instincts and Adam must hold himself up or he'll ruin the holiday for everyone. Also, Coach Gills is not enjoying Animas at all, with spoofs of many holiday specials such as How the Grinch Stole Christmas!, A Christmas Carol, and It's the Great Pumpkin, Charlie Brown. Note: This is a full-length special.
23a	10a	"Carny Crazy"	Roger Eschbacher	Chong Suk Lee	September 22, 2006
When the carnival comes to the school, Adam tries to win a princess ballerina snow globe with opposition from the cheating Spiffies.
23b	10b	"Up and Adam"	Tom Sheppard	William Reiss	September 22, 2006
Adam is given the keys to the Lookout Tower after passing a safety test the first try. The Lookout Tower is a bachelor pad located atop the school. Adam's job is to look out for threats to the school, but his job is made difficult when his friends use the lookout tower to throw a party.
24a	11a	"Making the Grade"	Tom Sheppard	Nate Cash	November 3, 2006
Instead of letter grades on his report card, Adam receives generic positive symbols. He complains about this to Principal Pixiefrog and he changes the current system to letter grades with terrifying results.
24b	11b	"One Lump or Tutor"	Roger Eschbacher	William Reiss	November 3, 2006
When Adam fails another Feeding Frenzy exam, Mr. Hornbill thinks that he may be held back if he doesn't pass the next exam. So Adam gets a tutor to help him, but the tutor is actually Bull.
25a	12a	"Pranks for the Memories"	Adam Pava and Tom Sheppard	Chong Suk Lee	November 17, 2006
Adam is embroiled in a prank war that he doesn't want to be in.
25b	12b	"Talking Teddy"	Tom Sheppard	William Reiss	November 17, 2006
Teddy Truman, Windsor's ventriloquist's dummy, is enrolled into Charles Darwin Middle School. Most students think that Teddy is a living thing, except Adam.
26a	13a	"Uniformity"	Roger Eschbacher	Sherm Cohen	January 5, 2007
Principal Pixiefrog institutes a school uniformity policy, which causes the students to act overly "proper" except Adam. Adam teams up with Dickie Sugarjumper to return the school back to its old, less mannered ways.
26b	13b	"Pants in Space"	Suzie Vlček and Brett Varon	Brett Varon	January 5, 2007
Jake wants to join the space program, but the only problem is that astronauts wear pants and he detests wearing pants, so Adam tries to help.

=== Shorts (2006–08) ===
No.	Title	Original release date
S01	"The Note"	September 9, 2006
In Mr. Blowhole's class, Jake keeps trying to pass a note to Adam, making him get caught holding the note and takes the blame as Mr. Blowhole writes him a letter for detention.
S02	"Cafeteria Duty"	September 16, 2006
Adam and Jake are sentenced to cafeteria duty for lighting a stick of dynamite - by complete accident.
S03	"Bathroom Break"	September 23, 2006
During class, Adam struggles to find a bathroom to use, but Mr. Hornbill tells him to wait until the bell rings.
S04	"I Got Rhythm"	September 30, 2006
Instead of dodgeball class, the students are assigned to dance. As Adam starts to dance, he attracts all the females in the class (who mistake his moves for a mating ritual). Adam attempts to flee unsuccessfully as the girls in class amorously pursue and tackle him.
S05	"Clam-mercial"	October 14, 2006
Dickie Sugarjumper advertises a new trinket called "Pocket Clam." Everyone wants to get one, Adam however thinks they're all worthless.
S06	"Bullroar"	October 21, 2006
Bull Sharkowski competes against Henry Armadillo in a duel for the title of being #1 Grandson, but loses and is given the title of #2 Grandson.
S07	"Photo Phobia"	October 28, 2006
It's the Charles Darwin Middle School's Picture Day and everybody has to be smiling for the camera, because Principal Pixiefrog takes pictures during the hall school day.
S08	"Lunchtime Blues"	November 11, 2006
When Adam's place at the lunch table is occupied by Bull Sharkowski, he must find himself another place to sit.
S09	"All-Nighter"	January 19, 2007
Adam and Jake try to stay up all night to pass the test in hibernation class.
S10	"Not So Good Will"	January 26, 2007
Jake and friends try to remake Adam's locker to be banana-themed. But when Adam opens his locker, it turns out to just have a banana in it.
S11	"Fresh Brewed"	February 8, 2007
Mr. Hornbill starts to give everybody detention when he doesn't get his cup of swamp-muck coffee.
S12	"Help Not Wanted"	February 15, 2008
Mr. Mandrill discovers that the students don't need his guidance. He tries to create problems for them, but only ends up creating a big problem for himself.
S13	"Adam's Penguin Poem"	February 22, 2008
It is Animal Punned Poem day, and after Adam says the penguin is mightier than the swordfish, everyone laughs uproariously with the penguins while the swordfish plan to clobber Adam.

=== Season 3 (2007) ===
Seasons 3 and 4 are the longest seasons in terms of half-hour episodes, with a total of 15 of them. They also both also consist a TV movie. This season is the longest season in terms of episode segments, with a total of 26. It also contains a half-hour special like the previous two seasons.

No. overall	No. in season	Title	Written by	Storyboard by	Original release date
27a	1a	"Sick Day"	Julie McNally-Cahill and Timothy Cahill; Darrick Bachman (story)	Chong Suk Lee	January 12, 2007
Whilst Adam is off school pretending to be sick, Jake misses him to the point of mentally breaking down.
27b	1b	"Cuddlemuffins"	Tom Sheppard	Chong Suk Lee	January 12, 2007
Jake tries to warn Adam not to fall for the Petting Zoo Kids' dirty tricks, but after falling for their cuteness, such as petting the lamb, rubbing the goat's belly, and hugging the pony, the little animals are robbing him of his dignity and his money.
28–29	2–3	"The Big Field Trip"	Tom Sheppard	Chong Suk Lee, Brett Varon, William Reiss, and Sherm Cohen	January 14, 2007
Adam joins his friends for their annual field trip, but disaster strikes when the bus crashes, and members of the group are lost in the woods and unable to find their way home. Note: This is a 44-minute special.
30a	4a	"The Spiffanos"	Michael Allen and Marlowe Weisman	Brett Varon	January 19, 2007
After borrowing a pencil from Phineas Porpoise, Adam and Jake have to deliver a lunchbox to a locker in return.
30b	4b	"The Little Mermonkey"	William Reiss	William Reiss	January 19, 2007
An Italian hermit crab named Herman finds a new home in Adam's locker, annoying him. Meanwhile, Jake searches for the legendary "Mermonkey".
31a	5a	"Diplomatic Insanity"	Mitch Larson	Marc Crisafulli	January 26, 2007
Lupe becomes outraged when she sees that a toucan star is making her species look like idiots, Adam debates to end this conflict by creating the "United Species", an animal version of the United Nations. Meanwhile, Jake comes up with a plan to shut down the organization after getting kicked out.
31b	5b	"Sidekicked"	Tom Sheppard	Kelsey Mann	January 26, 2007
The laws of nature says that everyone must have a sidekick. Consisting of Leader and Lackey, and that lackeys must respect their leader. However, Adam and Jake argue over who is the leader and lackey switching every other duo in the school's respective roles.
32a	6a	"Gorilla My Dreams"	Roger Eschbacher	Sherm Cohen	February 9, 2007
Windsor tries to hide from Deb, a gorilla from Cameroon, because he is afraid that he will have to marry her and be her mate for life.
32b	6b	"The Prince and the Pooper"	Tom Sheppard	William Reiss	February 9, 2007
Jake trades places with his spoiled cousin Lord Saucypants who is actually the pet monkey of minor popstar Dobie Broadway Jr. but his life is not as great as it sounds.
33	7	"That Darn Platypus" (Note: This episode was the third of five chapters for a special network event titled "Cartoon Network Invaded", a month long event that featured five different shows having alien invasions.)	Tom Sheppard	Douglas McCarthy and William Reiss	May 18, 2007
Everyone except Adam runs around the school, scared, thinking that new student, Rick Platypus, is actually an alien from outer space. They are correct. Note: This is a full-length special that was chapter three in the Cartoon Network Invaded event, which originally aired on May 18, 2007. This event involved special episodes from The Grim Adventures of Billy & Mandy, Ed, Edd n Eddy, Camp Lazlo, Foster's Home for Imaginary Friends, and My Gym Partner's a Monkey. Gilbert Gottfried guest-stars as Rick Platypus.
34a	8a	"Pride and Pixiefrog"	Mitch Larson	Chong Suk Lee	June 22, 2007
Principal Pixiefrog's ego becomes over-inflated when he wins Principal of the Year.
34b	8b	"The Morning Zoo"	Roger Eschbacher	Brett Varon	June 22, 2007
Jake fills in for Principal Pixiefrog after he loses his voice and bases his morning announcements on shock-jock style morning radio. Samurai Jack makes a guest appearance.
35a	9a	"Flesh Fur Fantasy"	Tom Sheppard	Marc Crisafulli	June 29, 2007
Adam gets a job in a gorilla costume to but is surprised when his friends find it offensive to the primates.
35b	9b	"Substitute Sweetheart"	Mitch Larson	Rossen Varbanov	June 29, 2007
Jake has a crush on the substitute teacher, Mrs. Slender Loris.
36a	10a	"Don't Noc It 'Til You Try It"	Suzie Vlček	Sherm Cohen	July 13, 2007
The gang must rescue Slips after he oversleeps in class and is stuck in night school.
36b	10b	"The Citronella Solution"	Tom Sheppard	William Reiss	July 13, 2007
Pixiefrog fits students with citronella collars that keep them in line after finding Jake has "the gift", enabling him to see into the future and causing the other students to panic after foreseeing "the end".
37a	11a	"Mongoosed"	Roger Eschbacher	Chong Suk Lee	July 20, 2007
Slips befriends a mongoose named Carl, not realizing that they are supposed to be enemies. After a film explains they naturally are predetermined to do so presented by Mr. Mandrill, they end up becoming enemies much to the annoyance of Jake and Adam.
37b	11b	"Mellow Fellows"	Mitch Larson	Brett Varon	July 20, 2007
Slips decides to become a guidance counselor like Mr. Mandrill after his day with Mrs. Warthog, but learns that there is only room for one at CDMS.
38a	12a	"Save the Drama for Your Llama"	Julie McNally-Cahill and Tom Sheppard; Suzie Vlček (story)	Marc Crisafulli and Chris Savino	July 27, 2007
Ingrid befriends Lola (voiced by Sarah Hagan), a llama who covets her life. However, Ingrid may have to end their friendship when she realizes that Lola is trying to steal her life.
38b	12b	"Hornbill and Ted's Bogus Journey"	Mitch Larson	Chris Headrick	July 27, 2007
Mr. Hornbill arrives at school with an insulting oxpecker named Ted (voiced by Lewis Black), whose making fun of Jake and all the other CDMS students.
39a	13a	"Lie, Cheetah, Steal"	Mitch Larson	Chong Suk Lee	August 3, 2007
A cheetah takes jurisdiction of Coach Gills' job. Adam and Jake persuade Gills to get it back through a contest.
39b	13b	"An Inconvenient Goof"	Tom Sheppard	Brett Varon	August 3, 2007
When the Polar Wing of CDMS starts to melt due to the effects of global warming, the entire school becomes flooded.
40a	14a	"The Frog Principal"	Tom Sheppard	Ian Wasseluk	August 24, 2007
Adam's new cologne literally attracts all the girls, (animal girls, at least) but when it falls into the wrong hands, Principal Pixiefrog is turned into a human after Adam hugs him.
40b	14b	"Meet the Spidermonkeys"	Brett Varon	Brett Varon	August 24, 2007
Jake decides to take Adam to the zoo after school so he can meet his parents.
41a	15a	"The Butt of the Jake"	Tom Sheppard	Carl Faruolo	August 31, 2007
Jake's obsession with his own butt goes too far. Note: Cartoon Network standards banned this episode after its second time airing, once they deemed the episode "offensive", "vulgar", and "too butt-filled". Its sister-in-syndication episode was later re-paired with "Hygiene Hijinks" on May 28th, 2008.
41b	15b	"Shark Fin Soupy"	Mitch Larson	Chris Savino	August 31, 2007
Because of the Duck Boys Mulligans' misbehaving antics, Bull Sharkowski's water headphones fall off and end up in possession of Soupy the basking shark.

=== Season 4 (2007–08) ===
This season is the shortest season in terms of episode segments, with a total of 24 of them. It also contains three half-hour specials, which also makes it the only season with more than one half-hour special.

No. overall	No. in season	Title	Written by	Storyboard by	Original release date
42a	1a	"The Hyena and the Mighty"	Kevin Hopps and Howie Perry	Howie Perry	September 17, 2007
Adam insults Jake's best friend, Rufus Hyena, by calling him a phony and hurt his feelings, causing him to cry nonstop, and now, he must try various antics in order to restore his laughter.
42b	1b	"Oh Henry"	Mitch Larson	Kevin Kaliher	September 17, 2007
Henry is moving back to Greenland, which CDMS protests.
43a	2a	"My Feral Lyon"	Tom Sheppard	Ian Wasseluk	September 18, 2007
Adam joins an after-school club for tough feral cats.
43b	2b	"A Mid Semester Life's Dream"	Brett Varon	Brett Varon	September 18, 2007
Adam and the CDMS kids try to help Miss Chameleon overcome stage fright.
44a	3a	"The Ivy League"	Mitch Larson	Chris Savino	September 19, 2007
In a familiar clerical mixup, Jake gets transferred to Creeping Broad-Leaf Sedge Middle School, a school for plants.
44b	3b	"Robo Frog 3000"	Tom Sheppard	Carl Faruolo	September 19, 2007
Principal Pixiefrog is replaced by a robot, and eventually the entire faculty is replaced by robots.
45a	4a	"The Notorious Windsor Gorilla"	Mitch Larson	Howie Perry	September 20, 2007
Windsor starts to find fame when Adam makes a painting of him. Note: This episode is notable for having a fourth wall gag, where the corporate tells Windsor that he'll get a TV series on Cartoon Network.
45b	4b	"Ingrid Through the Out Door"	Tom Sheppard	Nate Cash	September 20, 2007
After going through a growth spurt, Ingrid feels that she is too tall for the halls and is sent to high school.
46	5	"Glazed and Confused"	Mitch Larson	Chris Savino and Carl Faruolo	March 30, 2008
The gang goes to Hawaii for spring break while the faculty stays at school to welcome migrating birds. Note: This is the fourth double-length special to air.
47a	6a	"Hygiene Hijinks"	Mitch Larson	Ian Wasseluk	April 10, 2008
When Virgil "Bull" Sharkowski comes to Charles Darwin after an orthodontist appointment, Adam and Jake notice some changes. Bull's braces are gone, and his personality has completely changed. Now he's no longer bullying other students and wants to give helpful advice to others.
47b	6b	"Mandrill of the House"	Tom Sheppard	Brett Varon	April 10, 2008
Windsor feels both threatened and creeped out by the fact that his single mother is dating Mr. Mandrill, so he tries to break them up - despite Mr. Mandrill's attempts to reach Windsor and show him how much they have in common.
48a	7a	"Synch or Swim"	Todd Garfield	Chris Savino	April 17, 2008
Jake's plan to join the school's swimming team ends badly.
48b	7b	"Lyon's Anatomy"	Mitch Larson	Carl Faruolo	April 17, 2008
After a secret is out about Nurse Gazelle, Principal Pixiefrog becomes the school's nurse.
49a	8a	"Human Behavior"	Tom Sheppard	Howie Perry	April 24, 2008
Today is mid-terms at Charles Darwin Middle School, and Adam actually manages to pass all his tests with flying colors. But all the studying and preparation he had to do for the tests has put a strain on Adam's brain, so he must find a way to stop acting wild.
49b	8b	"Four Eyed Jake"	Mitch Larson	Cindy Morrow	April 24, 2008
Adam discovers that Jake has bad eyesight and knows that his friend needs to get his condition treated right away, so he tries to help him - albeit with humorous results.
50a	9a	"Where in the World Are Adam's Parents?"	Tom Sheppard	Ian Wasseluk	May 1, 2008
Jake, Windsor, and Slips believe Adam ate his parents, causing them to form a stakeout.
50b	9b	"Mountain Dude"	Mitch Larson	Brett Varon	May 1, 2008
Mr. Mandrill believes the kids are losing interest in life and decides to exite them with an extreme mountain goat, but Jake goes crazy and starts to think he's a goat.
51–52	10–11	"Animal School Musical"	Tom Sheppard	Brett Varon and Ian Wasseluk	May 25, 2008
In a satire of the High School Musical craze of the time, Jake's wish to live in a real, live musical comes true after he knocks the wish granting fish, David Coppertrout, out of the Central Stream. He soon realizes that he can't sing and doesn't have rhythm. He wants to take back his wish, but he can't until he gets musically talented. Note: This is a 44-minute special.
53a	12a	"A Very Special Boy"	Tom Sheppard	Chris Savino	July 27, 2008
Adam tries to get his "Special" status at school removed.
53b	12b	"Knights of the Multiplication Table"	Mitch Larson	Carl Faruolo	July 27, 2008
Phineas Porpoise daydreams that he and his Spiffy friends are knights in a medieval world, trying to save Lady Warthog from a dragon (portrayed by Jake).
54a	13a	"Wild Thing"	Tom Sheppard	Howie Perry	July 27, 2008
A human girl raised by possums attends Charles Darwin Middle School.
54b	13b	"Lonely Lyon"	Mitch Larson	Cindy Morrow	July 27, 2008
The students try to act more human when they fear Adam might leave the school.
55	14	"A Whole Zoo World"	Mitch Larson	Howie Perry and Ian Wasseluk	July 27, 2008
Adam trains to be a zookeeper over the summer, but he soon discovers that his friends resent those in his profession.
56	15	"A Thanksgiving Carol"	Tom Sheppard	Chris Savino and Carl Faruolo	November 27, 2008
The night before Thanksgiving, Adam is visited by three ghosts (parodying A Christmas Carol) to help him understand why his friends hate the holiday. At first Adam thinks the animals hate Thanksgiving because people eat turkeys, but it turns out they hate it because of the parades. Note: This episode shares release dates with the Foster's Home for Imaginary Friends special "Destination: Imagination".
