= The Big Field Trip =

- Also known as: My Gym Partner’s a Monkey: The Big Field Trip
- Genre: Comedy; Animated sitcom; Slapstick; Adventure
- Created by: Julie McNally Cahill; Timothy Cahill
- Written by: Tom Sheppard
- Directed by: Timothy Cahill
- Voices of: Grey DeLisle; Brian Doyle-Murray; Nika Futterman; Rick Gomez; Tom Kenny; Maurice LaMarche
- Theme music composer: Tom Sheppard; Pat Irwin
- Country of origin: United States
- Original language: English

Production
- Executive producers: Julie McNally Cahill; Timothy Cahill
- Producer: Victoria McCollum
- Editor: Tony Tedford
- Production company: Cartoon Network Studios

Original release
- Network: Cartoon Network
- Release: January 14, 2007

My Gym Partner’s a Monkey: The Big Field Trip is a 2007 television film which aired on January 14, 2007.

The TV-movie would also serve as the second and third aired episodes of the third season of the animated comedy television series My Gym Partner's a Monkey, and the 28th and 29th overall episodes of the series.

== Plot ==
Adam goes on the annual field trip when joining the school band. The trip is usually an experience, but this year, the tour bus crashes into the city's woods due to Adam's piccolo playing put the animals to sleep. They are now lost and they try their best to survive. The faculty and students cannot survive in the wilderness, as they are afraid of the wilderness, calling the animals "wild animals", when there are butterflies, bears, chipmunks, etc. and they are zoo animals. Adam tries to save the day by putting what he has learned at the school into use.

When Jake gets Adam's piccolo back, a whole army of chipmunks is ready to fire. They ended up getting kidnapped while Windsor, Slips, Ingrid and Lupe learn how to get along with the cuddly animals. After the chipmunks saw Adam's piccolo, they start to be under Jake's hands. As time went by, he was abusing them and Adam falls off the tree and tries to survive, he starts to take pride on what CDMS has taught him.

While Jake is given the title "King of the Chipmunks", Adam gets kidnapped by bears as he was covered in mud which completely confused them. When they trash the house (but not Adam), Adam eats chips and the bears go totally mad. After being saved by Jake, the chipmunks started to throw nuts, but now lets go to the teacher problem, Principal Pixiefrog had himself on the top of the bus with the totally mad team: Coach Gills, Vice-Coach Horace, Mr. Hornbill, Mr. Mandrill and Mrs. Warthog. After that totally wild adventure, Adam plays his music with the piccolo, and gets everybody in the bus and when the bears see the chips with Adam, they push and the field trip is finally gonna happen. After leaving the woods, the bus goes to a giant field called The Big Field, Adam finds out that they are actually going in a giant field and the school band uses non-instrumental objects like coconuts, bamboo & antelope bladder due to real music resulting in animals falling asleep, Adam tries to stay in tune with the band and uses his armpits but Mr. Mandrill stops the song and tells Adam that his out of tune and he knows that he's caught redhanded.

== Reception ==
Narina Sokolova won an Emmy Award for Outstanding Individual Achievement in Animation in 2007, for her work on the film. Kendall Lyons of Animation Insider gave the film a positive review, saying he "cannot get over the creativity and the free-styled antics of the characters including Adam and Jake. Granted, there are a few scenes that may make someone do double-takes and ask ... 'hey, did they just say that?' or 'hey, did they just do that?' but this is the kind of cartoon that is bright with colorful animation and is intelligent in its writing," and that he "highly appreciate the time the creators took with this movie!"
