= My Gym Partner's a Monkey =

American animated television series

- Genre: Slice of life; Slapstick; Comedy
- Created by: Julie McNally Cahill; Timothy Cahill
- Written by: Julie McNally Cahill; Timothy Cahill; Tom Sheppard; Roger Eschbacher; Mitch Larson; Adam Pava
- Directed by: Timothy Cahill
- Voices of: Nika Futterman; Tom Kenny; Rick Gomez; Grey DeLisle; Maurice LaMarche; Phil LaMarr
- Theme music composer: Tom Sheppard; Pat Irwin
- Opening theme: "My Gym Partner's a Monkey" sung by Nika Futterman and Tom Kenny
- Composers: Ari Posner; Tom Sheppard (original songs)
- Country of origin: United States
- Original language: English
- No. of seasons: 4
- No. of episodes: 56 (102 segments) (list of episodes)

Production
- Executive producers: Julie McNally-Cahill; Timothy Cahill; Brian A. Miller
- Producers: Victoria McCollum (seasons 1–3); Haven Alexander (season 4)
- Running time: 22 minutes 11 minutes for regular segments 22 minutes for special segments 44 minutes for TV movies
- Production company: Cartoon Network Studios

Original release
- Network: Cartoon Network
- Release: December 26, 2005 – November 27, 2008

My Gym Partner's a Monkey is an American animated television series created by Tim Cahill and Julie McNally Cahill for Cartoon Network. It aired from December 26, 2005, to November 27, 2008, ending with a total of four seasons and 56 episodes. The series follows Adam Lyon, a human who, after a clerical error listed his surname as "Lion", is forced to transfer to Charles Darwin Middle School, a school for local anthropomorphic zoo animals, where he is partnered with Jake Spidermonkey in gym, and quickly becomes best friends with him.

Saerom Animation provided the animation. The series won an Emmy Award in 2007 and was nominated for four Annie Awards.

== Summary ==
After a spelling error involving his last name, 12-year-old student named Adam Lyon is transferred to Charles Darwin Middle School, a middle school established for anthropomorphic zoo animals. There, he is partnered with a mischievous, eccentric spider monkey named Jake Spidermonkey in gym, hence the title of the series, and the two become best friends, along with a sassy toucan named Lupe, a giraffe named Ingrid, who is infatuated with Adam, the intelligent, wise gorilla Windsor, and Slips the easygoing python. In spite of his usual kindness and fondness for his friends, Adam despises being banished to Charles Darwin Middle School because of something beyond his control and longs for his previous human middle school.

Usually, the episodes are focused on Adam's experiences at Charles Darwin Middle School due to his inability to fit in with his anthropomorphic schoolmates, and the challenges that he must face (such as the presumed stupidity of his peers, being schooled in subjects of use only to animals, the introductions of new students of odd, dangerous, or strange species to the school or the misadventures that Adam stumbles into with them, or the common effects of adolescence as they are experienced by zoo animals).

== Episodes ==
Season	Segments	Episodes	Originally released	
Season	Segments	Episodes	First released	Last released
Pilot			2003	
1	25	13	December 26, 2005	May 26, 2006
2	25	13	June 8, 2006	January 5, 2007
Shorts	—N/a	13	September 9, 2006	
3	27	15	January 12, 2007	August 31, 2007
4	25	15	September 17, 2007	November 27, 2008

== Characters ==
=== Main ===
The central characters: Adam (left) and Jake (right)

- Adam Lyon (voiced by Nika Futterman)
- Jacob P. "Jake" Spidermonkey (voiced by Tom Kenny)
- Windsor Gorilla (voiced by Rick Gomez)
- Slips Python (voiced by Rick Gomez)
- Guadalupe "Lupe" Toucan (voiced by Grey DeLisle)
- Ingrid Giraffe (voiced by Grey DeLisle)
- Virgil "Bull" Sharkowski (voiced by Phil LaMarr)
- Principal Poncherello W. Pixiefrog (voiced by Maurice LaMarche)

=== Recurring ===
- Mrs. Geraldine Sharon Warthog (voiced by Grey DeLisle)
- Nurse Jacqueline Gazelle (voiced by Grey DeLisle)
- Henry Armadillo (voiced by Tom Kenny)
- Coach Tiffany Gills (voiced by Brian Doyle-Murray)
- Miss Anna Chameleon (voiced by Nika Futterman)
- Mr. Cyrus Q. Hornbill (voiced by Maurice LaMarche)
- Mrs. Eugenia Tusk (voiced by Cree Summer)
- Mr. Maurice Mandrill (voiced by Maurice LaMarche)
- Kerry Anderson (voiced by Cree Summer)
- Larry "Mr. I Didn't" (voiced by Phil LaMarr)

=== Minor ===
- Phineas Porpoise (voiced by Phil LaMarr)
- Margaret Rhino (voiced by Nika Futterman)
- LaTanya Hippo (voiced by Cree Summer)
- Joanie Ox (voiced by Grey DeLisle)
- James Ant (voiced by Rick Gomez)
- Dickie Sugarjumper (voiced by Tom Kenny)
- Endugu Elephant (voiced by Phil LaMarr)
- Superintendent Wolverine (voiced by Chris Edgerly)
- Vice Coach Horace Ferret (voiced by Tom Kenny / Robert Goulet in "Animal School Musical")
- Mr. Otto Blowhole (voiced by Maurice LaMarche)
- Mr. Ernesto Cheetah (voiced by John DiMaggio)
- Euripides Sharkowski (voiced by Phil LaMarr)
- Deidre Koala (voiced by Kath Soucie)
- Deb Ape (voiced by Kath Soucie)
- Dustin Flounder (voiced by Tom Kenny)
- Bruce Wolf (voiced by Tom Kenny)
- Vanna Flamingo (voiced by Cree Summer)
- Janet Musk Ox (voiced by Grey DeLisle)
- Eddie Panther (voiced by Cree Summer)
- Phillip "Lippy" Zebra (voiced by Maurice LaMarche)

== Release ==
=== Broadcast ===
The series aired its first episode on December 26, 2005 during Cartoon Network's “Sneak Peek Week” along with Cartoon Network original series Ben 10, Cartoon Network European co-production Robotboy and Canadian acquired series Zixx. The series began its regular run with a two-episode premiere on Cartoon Network's "Fridays" block on February 24, 2006. The My Gym Partner's a Monkey-based television film The Big Field Trip aired on January 14, 2007, as part of season 3. A special episode, "That Darn Platypus", aired on Cartoon Network on May 18, 2007, as part of Cartoon Network Invaded, a mini-series that aired 5 specials of different series from May 4 to May 28, 2007. The series ended its four-season run on November 27, 2008, with the episode "A Thanksgiving Carol". The series was also shown on the revived block Cartoon Planet from 2012 to 2013. In Latin America, the series currently airs on Tooncast since 2013. In Ukraine, the series aired on Novyi Kanal. The show runs in India on Cartoon Network by the name "Samsher Sikander Chuddie Buddie". The series began airing for the first time on Cartoon Network's now co-owned sister channel, Discovery Family, on October 11, 2025.

== Reception ==
=== Ratings ===
On the series' Cartoon Network "Fridays" block two-episode premiere at 9:00 and 9:30 P.M. EST, the first episode was seen by 1.2 million and the second by 1.3 million children ages 2–11, according to preliminary data from Nielsen Media Research. The 9:30 P.M. telecast ranked as the #1 telecast on all television, broadcast and cable, with both boys 6–11 and boys 2–11 in the time period. The series went on top the Fridays block ratings, gaining millions of viewers.

=== Critical response ===
William Barker of Web Wombat gave the King of the Jungle DVD a positive review, awarding it with a score of 70%, saying: "With an original – dare I say unique? – premise, My Gym Partner's a Monkey makes for a somewhat refreshing change from super heroes and mutants, and the cut-out animation style is captivating, though far from novel. It's not the most impressive cartoon show I've ever seen, but it's quite cute and fairly amusing – even for the older primates among us." Larisa Wiseman of Common Sense Media awarded the series three out of five stars, saying: "It's difficult to tell what age group the show's producers were aiming at – the animation style and slapstick by themselves would seem to appeal mainly to grade-schoolers, while the jokes and life lessons are definitely aimed at the tween set. The sly humor may even give some adults the occasional laugh-out-loud moment. Overall, My Gym Partner's a Monkey is commendable for its effort to include a subtle message in each episode. Younger viewers will probably find Jake's sometimes-annoying goofiness amusing, and will definitely find the story lines entertaining."

=== Awards and nominations ===
Year	Award	Category	Nominee	Result
2006	Annie Awards	Writing in an Animated Television Production	Tom Sheppard^{for "Nice Moustache"}	Nominated
2006	Annie Awards	Production Design in an Animated Television Production	Dan Krall^{for "Grub Drive"}	Nominated
2007	Emmy Awards	Outstanding Individual Achievement in Animation	Narina Sokolova^{for The Big Field Trip}	Won
2007	Annie Awards	Writing in an Animated Television Production	Tom Sheppard^{for "The Butt of Jake"}	Nominated
2007	Annie Awards	Best Animation Production Artist	Jim Worthy^{for "Meet the Spidermonkeys"}	Nominated

== Appearances in other media ==
Jake made a cameo in the OK K.O.! Let's Be Heroes episode "Crossover Nexus", as one of the cartoon characters who were turned into stones by Strike. He also appeared in the Jellystone special "Crisis of the Infinite Mirths" along with other Cartoon Network characters.
