= Van Partible =

American animator (born 1971)

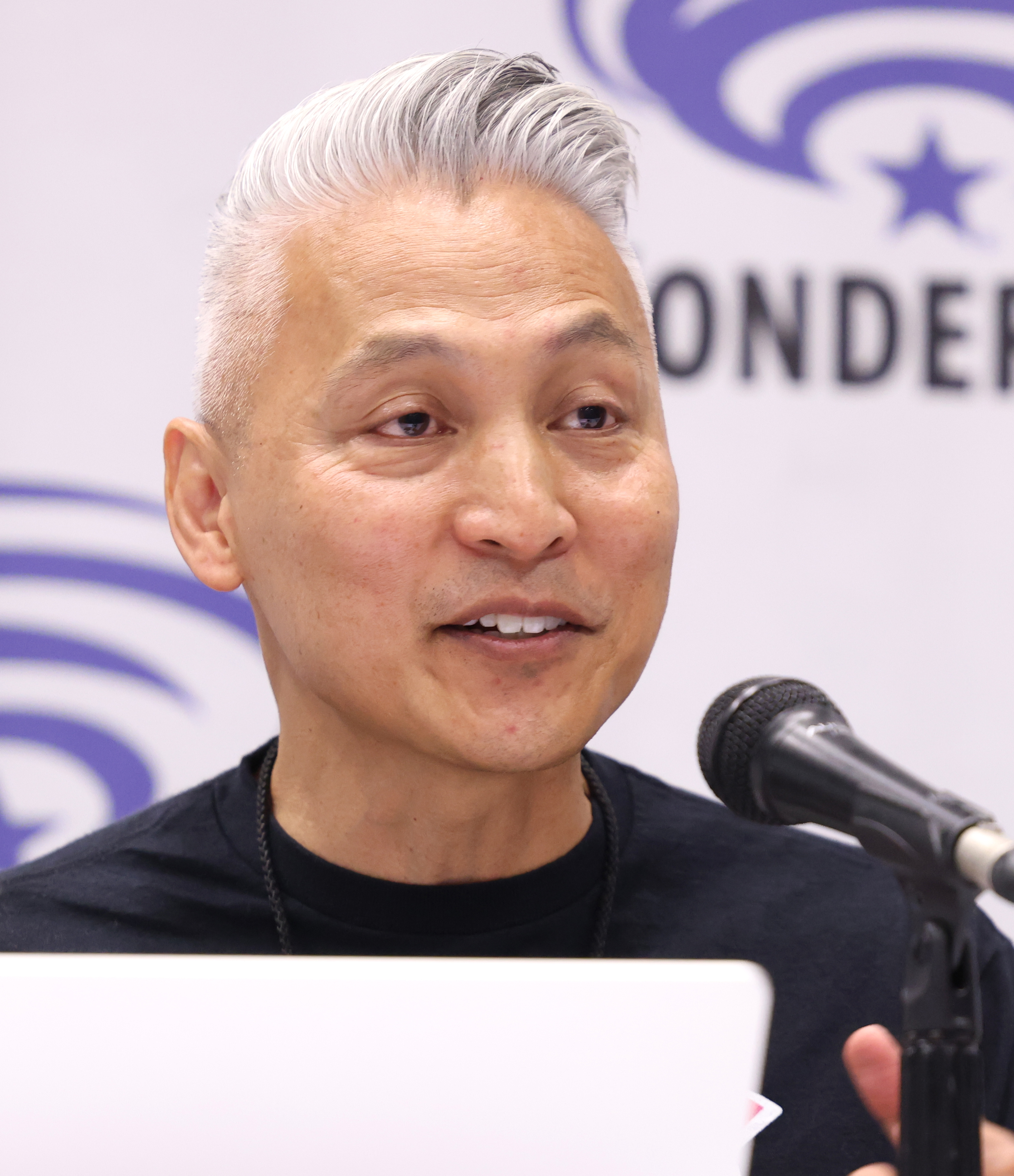
- Partible in 2026
- Born: Efrem Giovanni Bravo Partible; December 13, 1971 (age 54); Manila, Philippines
- Education: Loyola Marymount University (BA)
- Occupations: Cartoonist; writer; producer; director; animator
- Years active: 1993–present
- Notable work: Johnny Bravo
- Website: vanpartible.com

Efrem Giovanni Bravo Partible (born December 13, 1971), known professionally as Van Partible, is a Filipino-born American animator and cartoonist best known for creating the animated television series Johnny Bravo.

== Early life and education ==
Partible was born in Manila on December 13, 1971, moving to the United States when he was nine months old. He grew up in Salinas, California with an avid love of drawing. Despite growing up copying artwork from collections of old comic books, it was not until college that Partible decided to pursue a career in animation. Partible attended Loyola Marymount University where he began work on a senior thesis project titled Mess O' Blues (1993). Initially a film about three Elvis Presley impersonators, time constraints influenced Partible to shrink the concept's scale to one impersonator.

== Career ==
=== Johnny Bravo ===
Upon graduation in 1993, Partible was 22 and did not have the extensive experience and portfolio that studios were looking for, and for a while worked in a daycare program for a local elementary school. Mess O' Blues was shown by Partible's animation professor, Dan McLaughlin, to a friend working for Hanna-Barbera Cartoons. The studio loved the film and asked Partible to do a pitch for a seven-minute cartoon based on it – what would become Johnny Bravo.

The short was produced for Cartoon Network's new animation showcase titled World Premiere Toons. Partible initially roomed with Craig McCracken (creator of The Powerpuff Girls, Foster's Home For Imaginary Friends, and Wander Over Yonder), Paul Rudish (a designer on that series) and Genndy Tartakovsky (creator of Dexter's Laboratory, Samurai Jack, and Star Wars: Clone Wars). The only two cartoonists who worked at Hanna-Barbera fresh out of college were Partible and Seth MacFarlane (creator of Family Guy, American Dad!, and The Cleveland Show). Partible changed his character from Mess O' Blues around so that "he would be more of this '50's iconic James Dean-looking character that talked like Elvis". Partible picked voice actor Jeff Bennett to play Johnny Bravo solely based on his young, hyped Elvis impression.

The short premiered on World Premiere Toons on March 26, 1995, and involved Johnny trying to score with a zookeeper girl by capturing a runaway gorilla. Partible, with a small team of animators, animated the short themselves in-house at Hanna-Barbera using digital ink and paint (the latter shorts and first three seasons of the series would instead use the traditional ink and paint and film camera). Two more shorts on the program followed (Jungle Boy in "Mr. Monkeyman", and Johnny Bravo and the Amazon Women), and the shorts were so popular that Cartoon Network commissioned a first season of series based around Johnny Bravo, consisting of 13 episodes.

The crew of the first season of Johnny Bravo consisted of several writers, animators, and directors from World Premiere Toons, including MacFarlane, Butch Hartman, Steve Marmel, and John McIntyre. Veteran cartoonist and animation legend Joseph Barbera was also a creative consultant for the first season of the series. The series premiered on July 14, 1997, and three additional seasons followed. Partible was fired following the first season amid the Warner Bros. takeover of Turner Broadcasting; he returned to produce "A Johnny Bravo Christmas" and its fourth season.

=== Other work ===
Partible was a guest in a Space Ghost Coast to Coast episode, "President's Day Nightmare", which premiered February 20, 1995; the episode also features Genndy Tartakovsky, Eugene Mattos, Dian Parkinson, Craig McCracken and Pat Ventura.

Partible created a short called The Phabulizers for Disney Channel as a part of a short series called Shorty McShorts' Shorts.

He has produced original materials for Film Roman, Walt Disney Television Animation, Fox Kids and for NBC's Medium, for which he was the animation producer for the premiere of the third season. Partible served as an executive producer for Cartoon Network Asia's original programming from 2007 to 2012.

Partible worked on a video game titled Dancers of War alongside Scott Eaton (Call of Duty, Medal of Honor) and Vince Clarke (of Depeche Mode, Yaz), although the project ended after the Kickstarter campaign was unsuccessful.

He currently teaches animation workshops at Loyola Marymount University, works as a director at Surfer Jack Productions in Venice, California, and directed the Pete the Cat series for Amazon, based on the children's books by James Dean.
