= Johnny Bravo =

American animated television series

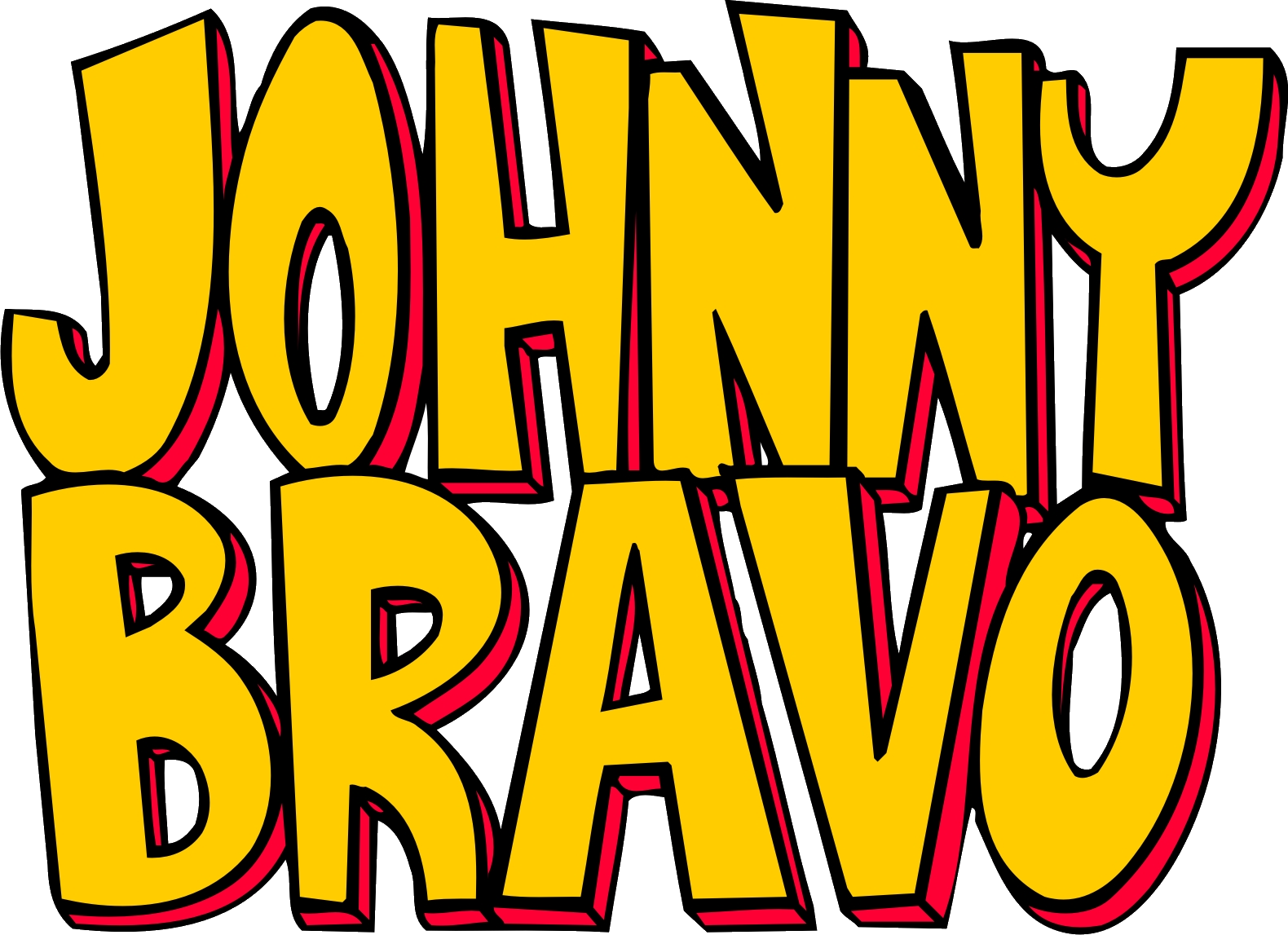
- Genre: Animated sitcom; Romantic comedy
- Created by: Van Partible
- Voices of: Jeff Bennett; Brenda Vaccaro; Mae Whitman; Tom Kenny; Larry Drake (Note: Seasons 2–3)
- Theme music composer: Louis Fagenson; Christopher Neal Nelson
- Opening theme: "Johnny Bravo"
- Ending theme: "Johnny Bravo" (instrumental) (Note: Seasons 1 and 4) (Note: Seasons 2 and 3 replace this with an instrumental of Neal Nelson's version.)
- Composers: Louis Fagenson; Christopher Neal Nelson; Additional Music: Guy Moon (Note: Season 1); Gary Lionelli
- Country of origin: United States
- Original language: English
- No. of seasons: 4
- No. of episodes: 65 (Note: The series contains 179 unique segments.) (+ 2 specials); (list of episodes)

Production
- Executive producers: Sherry Gunther; Van Partible (Note: Season 4)
- Producers: Cos Anzilotti; Kirk Tingblad; Gary Hartle
- Running time: 23 minutes
- Production company: Cartoon Network Studios (Note: Produced under Hanna-Barbera Cartoons for seasons 1–3.)

Original release
- Network: Cartoon Network
- Release: July 14, 1997 – August 27, 2004

Related
- What a Cartoon!

Johnny Bravo is an American animated sitcom created by Van Partible for Cartoon Network. The second of the network's Cartoon Cartoons, it aired from July 14, 1997, to August 27, 2004. The titular Johnny Bravo (voiced by Jeff Bennett), who is loosely based on Elvis Presley and James Dean, is a blonde-haired sunglasses-wearing, muscular, and dimwitted young man who lives with his mother and attempts to get women to date him, though he always falls short because of his actions. He ends up in bizarre situations and predicaments, often accompanied by celebrity guest characters such as Donny Osmond or Adam West. Throughout its run, the show was known for its adult humor and pop culture references.

Partible pitched the series to Hanna-Barbera's animation showcase What a Cartoon!, basing it on his senior thesis project he produced while attending Loyola Marymount University. A pilot short aired on Cartoon Network in 1995. The series was renewed for a second season in 1999, after Partible was fired, and the show was retooled under the direction of Kirk Tingblad. In 2003, for the series' fourth season, Partible returned and restored the show to its original format and style. In its four seasons, a total of 67 episodes have aired. The first three seasons were produced by Hanna-Barbera Cartoons, while the fourth season was produced by Cartoon Network Studios.

Johnny Bravo was nominated for four Annie Awards, one YoungStar Award, and two Golden Reel Awards. The series helped launch the careers of several animators, including Seth MacFarlane and Butch Hartman. Spin-off media include comic books, DVD and VHS releases, collectible toys, T-shirts with Johnny's well known phrase "Whoa Mama", and video games.

== Premise ==
From left to right: Johnny Bravo, Suzy, and Bunny Bravo.

The series centers on Johnny Bravo (voiced by Jeff Bennett), (Note: Marc Silk has also voiced Johnny Bravo, in bumpers for Cartoon Network UK & Ireland, when the character hosted a programming block on the channel. Silk did not play the character in the show itself.) a conceited, muscular narcissist and dimwitted self-proclaimed womanizing young man with 1960s surfer vibes, a blonde pompadour, sunglasses, and an Elvis Presley-esque voice, apparently of Italian heritage, who lives in Aron City (a nod to Presley's middle name). Episodes typically revolve around him trying to get a woman to go on a date with him, though his advances are usually rejected and result in the woman in question harming him in a comedic way due to his boorish manner. Johnny's companions are Bunny "Momma" Bravo (Brenda Vaccaro), his lively, caring, extroverted, more sensible mother, who wears cat eye sunglasses; and Little Suzy (Mae Whitman), a talkative and intelligent young girl from the neighborhood who likes to agitate Johnny, although he rarely remembers her name.

Recurring characters include Carl Chryniszzswics (Tom Kenny), a geek who idolizes Johnny despite being bullied and bossed around by him; Pops (Larry Drake), the unscrupulous owner of the local diner who provides advice to Johnny, along with food made from atypical ingredients; Master Hamma (Brian Tochi), a Japanese martial arts instructor who teaches Johnny but never considers him a student due to being the weakest and most pathetic student in the dojo; Donny Osmond (himself), a cheery and optimistic teen idol who irritates Johnny; and Jungle Boy (Cody Dorkin), a jungle-dwelling feral child with super strength and the ability to speak to animals.

Much of the series' humor is derived from celebrity guest star appearances and references to popular culture. For example, an episode in season 1 is based around homages to The Twilight Zone, and in another episode, one of the Village People can be seen in the background. The series has had numerous guest stars, including Adam West, Shaquille O'Neal, Seth Green and the aforementioned Donny Osmond. In the first season, creator Van Partible intended for the show's middle segment to be a form of "Johnny Bravo Meets...", a parody of The New Scooby-Doo Movies, which would feature appearances from popular 1970s icons, but guest stars were used informally after the second season began. Many Hanna-Barbera characters had cameo appearances in the series, including the cast of Scooby-Doo, Speed Buggy, Jabberjaw, Fred Flintstone, Yogi Bear, The Blue Falcon, Black Widow, and Huckleberry Hound.

Adult humor is a frequent presence. In one episode, when Suzy calls Johnny to ask if he wants to come over, Johnny nonchalantly tells her to "[call] back in 15 years when [she is] a co-ed", and in another, when Johnny is hit by a tranquilizer dart and is informed he has only six seconds of consciousness left and to "use it wisely", he immediately pulls out a girlie magazine. In regard to the adult humor, Hartman stated that "being concerned with the content of the episodes wasn't our main focus", and creator Partible remembers: "No one was really watching Cartoon Network ... As far as content, they were pretty lenient on all the kind of things that were going on."

== Production ==
=== Development ===
While attending Loyola Marymount University, Van Partible produced his senior thesis project Mess O' Blues (1993), an animated short film about an Elvis Presley impersonator voiced by his LMU roommate, actor Christopher Keene Kelly (The Blacklist, Succession) and recent LMU film school graduate, writer/producer/VO Artist Lee J. Bognar (JAG, The Expatriate Act, Sioux Me, SNL, The Man Show) who worked with Partible to re-write his short story and lend their vocal skills to the project, even animating some of the cells. That partnership proved key when Partible accidentally destroyed the soundtrack while editing the final cut just before the public screening for grading in front of a live packed theater at LMU. Bognar, who already had several feature films under his belt at Disney (Sister Act) and Paramount (Thing Called Love), quickly assembled the actors and musicians to perform the soundtrack – LIVE. The musicians played acoustically and the voice actors provided the sound effects when they weren't speaking their lines. The rare spectacle of a live Foley session expertly executed by recent LMU grads is a great source of pride for Loyola Marymount University and it's School Film and Television to this day as it would receive a standing ovation from the packed theater and caught the attention of industry scouts. Shortly after, Partible's animation professor said he screened the film to a friend who worked for Hanna-Barbera and the studio asked Partible to develop it into a pitch for seven minute short, which Hanna-Barbera would own.

For the new short, Partible revised his main character from Mess O' Blues, renaming him "Johnny Bravo" and making him "this '50s iconic James Dean-looking character that talked like Elvis." He was also inspired by Michael Jackson's "impetus for using whip snaps and cracks" (like in Captain EO) for whenever Johnny struck a pose. Voice actor Jeff Bennett was cast as Johnny, based solely on his young, hyped Elvis impression. Partible, with a small team of animators, animated the short themselves in-house at Hanna-Barbera using digital ink and paint.

The short, titled Johnny Bravo, was aired on Cartoon Network's animation showcase, World Premiere Toons, on March 26, 1995. Two more shorts followed: Jungle Boy in "Mr. Monkeyman" in 1996 and Johnny Bravo and the Amazon Women in 1997.

The name Johnny Bravo derived from creator Van Partible's middle name, Giovanni Bravo, as well as from The Brady Bunch episode "Adios, Johnny Bravo", where Greg Brady changes his name to Johnny Bravo in order to sign a record deal.

=== Original seasons ===
The popularity of the shorts led to Cartoon Network commissioning a first season of Johnny Bravo, consisting of 13 episodes. The crew of the first season consisted of several writers, animators, and directors from World Premiere Toons, including Seth MacFarlane, Butch Hartman, Steve Marmel, and John McIntyre. Veteran animator Joseph Barbera also served as a creative consultant and mentor for the first season. Partible stated in a 1997 interview the goal of the series was to have "animation reminiscent of the old Hanna-Barbera cartoons".

It was Hanna-Barbera's first production after Turner Broadcasting System was purchased by Time Warner.

Johnny Bravo premiered on July 14, 1997, and the first season completed production in December of that year.

=== Retool seasons ===
After the first season, Johnny Bravo was put on hiatus, until it was picked up for an unexpected second season in 1999. Van Partible was fired during Warner Bros. takeover of Turner Broadcasting and Kirk Tingblad took over as director, leading to a major retooling in the show's visual style, tone, humor, and characters. The show retained this format for the third season.

The series was put on hiatus once again until it was renewed for a fourth season in 2003, which aired in 2004. The final season of the series returned to the humor of the original shorts and first season of the series, with Van Partible returning and co-directing all of the fourth season episodes, although the Jungle Boy character from the first season never returned.

== Episodes ==
Season	Segments	Episodes	Originally released		
Season	Segments	Episodes	First released	Last released	Network
1	38	13	March 5, 1995	December 15, 1997	Cartoon Network
2	66	22	July 2, 1999	January 28, 2000	Cartoon Network
3	51	17	August 11, 2000	June 14, 2002	Cartoon Network
Specials	N/A	2	December 7, 2001	February 14, 2003	Cartoon Network
4	24	13	February 20, 2004	August 27, 2004	Cartoon Network
Television film			2011		Cartoon Network (India)

== Reception and legacy ==
Johnny Bravo was Cartoon Network's highest-rated program in 1999, garnering a 2.2 rating in households and a 4.4 rating among children aged 6 to 11 years, its target demographic. In 2009, IGN ranked Johnny Bravo No. 71 for its Top 100 Animated Series list.

After the series ended in 2004, the No. 5 Kellogg's Chevrolet was given a special paint scheme with Johnny Bravo on the hood. It was driven by Kyle Busch in the 2005 Sharpie 500 NASCAR race.

On the long lasting impact of the show, writer/director Butch Hartman states:

When Johnny Bravo first came out, I don't think a lot of people had high hopes for it, and I think it was really cool that proved exactly what kind of character he was. No one really thought it was going to go anywhere. Not only has it gone somewhere, it's actually still around, it's very iconic now, 15, 16 years later.

The title character is considered "iconic", and his catchphrases are relatively common in popular culture.

The show's creative team went on to create many successful television series throughout the 1990s and 2000s, including writer Seth MacFarlane, creator of the popular animated series Family Guy. Shortly after the series' first season was completed, writer/director Butch Hartman left to work on Nickelodeon's Oh Yeah! Cartoons, from which those shorts spun off his own success, The Fairly OddParents. Steve Marmel, writer for Johnny Bravo, has been a producer and writer for The Fairly OddParents since its premiere in 2001, and is also the creator of the live-action sitcom Sonny with a Chance. In addition to Johnny Bravo, director John McIntyre directed episodes of several other Cartoon Cartoons, and more recently served as a supervising director on Cartoon Network's original series The Marvelous Misadventures of Flapjack.

In 2023 Indian Entertainment Journal Pinkvilla named Johnny Bravo among the top 10 cartoon shows of the 1990s. They mentioned the running gag of Johnny Bravo chasing after women and getting beaten up by them while also featuring other action and comedic themes such as getting lost in distant places while attempting to travel to simple locations and his subsequent explorations and adventures as having great comedic influence in future cartoons.

=== Awards and nominations ===
Year	Award	Category	Nominee(s)	Result
1997	Annie Award	Best Individual Achievement: Voice Acting by a Male Performer in a TV Production	Jeff Bennett (as Johnny Bravo)	Nominated
1998	Annie Award	Outstanding Individual Achievement for Writing in an Animated Television Production	Steve Marmel (for "The Perfect Gift")	Nominated
1998	YoungStar Award	Best Performance in a Voice Over Talent	Mae Whitman (as Little Suzy)	Nominated
2000	Annie Award	Outstanding Individual Achievement for Directing in an Animated Television Production	Kirk Tingblad (for "Noir Johnny")	Nominated
2000	Annie Award	Outstanding Individual Achievement for Storyboarding in an Animated Television Production	Mary Hanley (for "Noir Johnny")	Nominated
2001	Golden Reel Award	Best Sound Editing — Television Animated Series — Sound	Glenn Oyabe, Kerry Iverson, Jesse Aruda, and John Bires (for "The Johnny Bravo Affair/Biosphere Johnny/Spa Spaz")	Nominated
2004	Golden Reel Award	Best Sound Editing in Television Animation — Music	Roy Braverman (for "It's Valentine's Day, Johnny Bravo")	Nominated

== Spin-offs ==
=== JBVO: Your All Request Cartoon Show ===
JBVO: Your All Request Cartoon Show was a programming block that aired Sundays on Cartoon Network from April 2, 2000, to mid-2001. It was hosted by Johnny Bravo, along with some infrequent guest stars such as Chicken (from Cow and Chicken) and Dexter (from Dexter's Laboratory). Callers would write into the show via mail or through the Cartoon Network website to call the show and request a cartoon from Cartoon Network's cartoon library, which would then be played, with an exception of half-hour-long shows. One caller of the show named Jennifer requested an episode of Dragon Ball Z. Being that it was half-hour long, Johnny regretfully had to fast-forward through the entire episode with Johnny providing only expositional commentary. Afterward, Johnny apologized to the caller for the inconvenience.

After the series ended, a spin-off of JBVO named Toon FM was launched in Europe. The series had a few unique changes, such as Godzilla presenting the weather. The spin-off also had Brak from Space Ghost as the co-host.

There was also a similar spin-off of the JBVO concept itself entitled Viva Las Bravo, a summer block that aired from 2005 to 2006 on certain European variants of Cartoon Network. Every day Johnny would announce three cartoons, and the one getting the highest votes via email or on CartoonNetworkHQ.net would be shown for two hours the next day. He would also constantly appear in commercial breaks, cracking jokes or answering humorous emails and phone calls.

== Media ==
=== Comics ===
Johnny Bravo first appeared in the Cartoon Network Starring series from DC Comics from 1999 to 2001. Newer stories were then included for Cartoon Network's Cartoon Cartoons anthology comic from DC comics from 2001 to 2004. As well as the comics successor, Cartoon Network Block Party, from 2004 to 2009. In February 2013, IDW Publishing announced a partnership with Cartoon Network to produce comics based on its publishing properties. Johnny Bravo was one of these titles announced to be published. Johnny Bravo would also appear as a minor supporting character in the Merryweather Media webtoon series Stalker x Stalker.

=== Video games ===
A video game titled Johnny Bravo in The Hukka Mega Mighty Ultra Extreme Date-O-Rama! was released on June 9, 2009, for the Nintendo DS and PlayStation 2. The PlayStation 2 version was released exclusively in Europe and Australia by Blast! Entertainment, while the DS version was released in North America by MumboJumbo.

Characters from Johnny Bravo are featured in the Cartoon Network games Cartoon Network: Block Party, Cartoon Network Racing, Cartoon Network Speedway, Cartoon Network Universe: FusionFall, and Cartoon Network: Punch Time Explosion.

=== Planned film ===
In October 2002, Variety reported that Warner Bros. had secured the film rights to make a live-action Johnny Bravo feature-length film "as a potential starring vehicle" for Dwayne "The Rock" Johnson. However, no further developments regarding this project have been announced since then.

== Home media ==
Warner Bros. stated in an interview that they were "...in conversations with Cartoon Network" for DVD collections of various cartoons, among which was Johnny Bravo in 2006. Johnny Bravo: Season 1, a two-disc set featuring the complete first season which contains all 13 episodes, was released by Madman Entertainment in Australia and New Zealand (Region 4) on October 10, 2007. On November 4, 2009, the complete second season was released.

A Region 1 release of the first season, with different cover art and new special features, was released by Warner Home Video on June 15, 2010. The release is first in an official release of several Cartoon Cartoons on DVD, under the "Cartoon Network Hall of Fame" name.

The PlayStation 2 version of the video game Cartoon Network Racing contains the episodes "Doommates" and "Johnny's Telethon" as unlockable extras.

Johnny Bravo home media releases
Season	Title	Release dates	
Season	Title	Region 1	Region 2
1	Scooby-Doo and the Toon Tour of Mysteries	June 2004	—N/a
1	Nine Creepy Cartoon Capers	August 10, 2004	—N/a
1	Cartoon Network Christmas Rocks	October 4, 2005	October 18, 2010
1	The Complete First Season	June 15, 2010	—N/a
1	Hall of Fame #1	March 13, 2012	—N/a
2	Scooby-Doo and the Toon Tour of Mysteries	June 2004	—N/a
3	Cartoon Network Christmas: Yuletide Follies	October 5, 2004	—N/a
3	Grossest Halloween Ever	August 9, 2005	—N/a

== See also ==
- List of works produced by Hanna-Barbera Productions
