= 1999 in animation =

1999 in animation is an overview of notable events, including notable awards, list of films released, television show debuts and endings, and notable deaths.

== Events ==
=== January ===
- January 4: The first episode of the Cartoon Network series, Ed, Edd n Eddy first airs.
- January 18: Season 6 of Rugrats begins on Nickelodeon with the premiere of the episodes "Chuckie's Duckling/A Dog's Life".
- January 20: South Park concludes its second season on Comedy Central with the episode "Prehistoric Ice Man". It was watched by over three million viewers that night.
- January 21: Anime producer Yoshinobu Nishizaki is sentenced to two years and eight months in prison for a drug possession case of two years ago.
- January 22: In Sweden the first episode of De tre vännerna och Jerry (The Three Friends and Jerry) premieres.
- January 25:
  - The first episode of an animated sitcom adaptation of Scott Adams' newspaper comic Dilbert premiers, Dilbert.
  - The first episode of Zoboomafoo airs.
- January 29: The Japanese animation studio TNK is founded.
- January 31: The first episode of Family Guy airs.

=== February ===
- February 1: Anime producer Yoshinobu Nishizaki is arrested after a handgun, 131 bullets and 20 grams of stimulant drugs were seized from his house in Setagaya Ward, Tokyo. Nishizaki, voluntarily submitted two automatic rifles, 1,800 bullets, and 30 howitzer shells kept in a station wagon in his garage, police said. Police say that Nishizaki had hidden an Austrian handgun loaded with three bullets under a zaisu chair in a study. Nishizaki told them that he had bought the handgun in Hong Kong 10 years earlier.
- February 2: Nickelodeon and the Children's Television Workshop (now known as Sesame Workshop) launches Noggin, a commercial-free brand aimed at children aged 6–12.

=== March ===
- March 26: 71st Academy Awards:
  - Bunny by Chris Wedge wins the Academy Award for Best Animated Short Film.
  - When You Believe by Stephen Schwartz from The Prince of Egypt wins the Academy Award for Best Original Song.
- March 28: The first episode of Futurama airs. It marks the debut of characters Philip J. Fry, Professor Farnsworth, Leela and Bender. The first episode also guest stars television personality Dick Clark and actor Leonard Nimoy.

=== April ===
- April 1: Michael Schoemann's Millionaire Dogs premieres in Germany. The film became popular at its home country as it aired on Cartoon Network four years later.
- April 7: Season 3 of South Park begins on Comedy Central with the premiere of the episode "Rainforest Shmainforest".
- Specific date unknown: The first Animation Masters Summit is organized in India.

=== May ===
- May 1: The first episodes of SpongeBob SquarePants air on Nickelodeon as a sneak peek after the 12th annual Kids Choice Awards. It is the longest-running Nicktoon series and becomes a global phenomenon.
- May 2: The Family Guy episode "A Hero Sits Next Door" premieres on Fox, this episode marks the debut of iconic character Joe Swanson (as well as his wife Bonnie and their son Kevin). It was seen by just over 12.6 million viewers that night.
- May 8: The first episode of The New Woody Woodpecker Show airs.
- May 16:
- The Simpsons concludes its tenth season on Fox with the episode "Thirty Minutes over Tokyo", which was watched by just over 12.5 million viewers that night.
- Family Guy concludes its first season on Fox with the episode "Brian: Portrait of a Dog", which was watched by over 10 million viewers that night.
- May 18: King of the Hill concludes its third season on Fox with the episode "As Old as the Hills...", leaving the show on a cliffhanger. It was seen by over 7.1 million viewers that night.
- May 19: 20th Television Animation is founded.
- May 22: Aleksandr Petrov's The Old Man and the Sea premieres.
- Specific date unknown: Gene Fowler founds animation studio Fatkat, which will last until May 2009.

=== June ===
- June 10: I Am Weasel gets its own spinoff series after separating from Cow and Chicken. This spinoff completely changes aspects from the previous seasons as I. R. Baboon receives his "hero" status over I. M. Weasel.
- June 11:
  - Cartoon Network launches its new programming block, Cartoon Cartoon Fridays.
  - Ed, Edd n Eddy concludes its first season on Cartoon Network with the premiere of the episodes "Button Yer Ed/Avast Ye Eds".
- June 12: The Walt Disney Company releases Tarzan. This Disney input had suffered legal problems after its release as Disney limited the use of these characters while using them outside the Tarzan franchise were restricted since they were owned by Edgar Rice Burroughs, Inc.
- June 30: A film adaptation of South Park, named South Park: Bigger, Longer & Uncut premieres. This theatrical adaptation was infamous for its sexually explicit content.

=== July ===
- July 14: The South Park episode "Cat Orgy" premieres on Comedy Central, this is the first part in the Meteor Shower event.
- July 17: SpongeBob SquarePants makes it official premiere on Nickelodeon with the episodes "Bubblestand/Ripped Pants". The show's official premiere was seen by just over 2.5 million viewers that morning (with it only being viewed by 1.9 million children from ages 2–11).
- July 21: The South Park episode "Two Guys Naked in a Hot Tub" premieres on Comedy Central, this is the second part in the Meteor Shower event and the first episode where the character Butters Stotch has a major supporting role in the show.
- July 28:
  - André Franquin's heirs and copyright holders win the trial against the Walt Disney Animation Studios over their animated TV series version of Franquin's comics character Marsupilami, citing breaches of its license contract: Disney had failed to produce thirteen half-hour episodes (instead producing six to eight minute shorts) or use its "best efforts" to secure a commitment from a network to air the show, and it launched its marketing campaign during a time when the show was not being broadcast. Marsu also accused Disney of fraudulent concealment; the judge noted that Disney had decided to not devote sufficient resources to the Marsupilami project, and had concealed this fact from Marsu. Disney pays back the damage and hands the rights to the series back to Franquin's company Marsu Productions.
  - The South Park episode "Jewbilee" premieres on Comedy Central, this is the third and final part in the Meteor Shower event.
- July 31: The SpongeBob SquarePants episodes "Jellyfishing/Plankton!" premiere on Nickelodeon, the latter episode marks the debut of the show's main antagonist, Sheldon J. Plankton (and his computer wife Karen). The episodes were seen by nearly 2.9 million viewers that morning.

=== August ===
- August 6: The Iron Giant premieres, but doesn't do well at the box office. It will only become a cult classic later.
- August 7: The SpongeBob SquarePants episodes "Naughty Nautical Neighbors/Boating School" premiere on Nickelodeon, the latter episode marks the debut of SpongeBob's driving teacher Mrs. Puff. The episodes were seen by over 2.8 million viewers that morning.
- August 16: The first episode of Rocket Power airs on Nickelodeon.
- August 21: The SpongeBob SquarePants episodes "Mermaid Man and Barnacle Boy/Pickles" premiere on Nickelodeon, the former episode marks the debut of the titular episode characters, Mermaid Man and Barnacle Boy. The episodes were seen by over 2.9 million viewers that morning.
- August 30: Sonic Underground airs. Unlike the proclaimed two series that aired in 1993, this incarnation of Sonic the Hedgehog became a disappointment to the fans of the video game series, ending it after 40 episodes.

=== September ===
- September 6:
  - The first episode of Dragon Tales airs and PBS Kids launches.
  - The first episode of Oggy and the Cockroaches airs.
- September 17: The SpongeBob SquarePants episodes "Sandy's Rocket/Squeaky Boots" premiere on Nickelodeon, the latter episode marks the debut of Mr. Krabs' teenage whale daughter Pearl. The episodes were watched by exactly 2.4 million viewers that night.
- September 23: Season 2 of Family Guy begins on Fox with the premiere of the episode "Peter, Peter, Caviar Eater", which was watched by over 7 million viewers that night.
- September 24: John Kricfalusi's Boo Boo Runs Wild, a parody of Yogi Bear, first airs.
- September 26:
- Season 4 of King of the Hill begins on Fox with the premiere of the episode "...Peggy Hill: The Decline and Fall", which follows up from the events of Season 3's finale "As Old as the Hills...". It was seen by over 9.7 million viewers that night.
- Season 11 of The Simpsons begins on Fox with the premiere of the episode "Beyond Blunderdome", which was watched by over 12.9 million viewers that night.

=== October ===
- October 4: Season 4 of Arthur begins on PBS Kids with the premiere of the episodes "D.W.‘s Library Card" and the infamous one "Arthur's Big Hit".
- October 5: Scooby-Doo! and the Witch's Ghost is released. It was deemed controversial during the time of release due to the religious groups claiming the film as "Satanic". This direct-to-video movie was not a marketing success as it suffered production woes over the generally acclaimed Zombie Island.
- October 8: The famous Arthur episode "The Contest" premieres as art styles parodied from independent programs, such as South Park and Dr. Katz, Professional Therapist. This episode was an actual contest won by Holly Holland, a young girl that lived in Canadian, Oklahoma.
- October 31: The Simpsons' "Treehouse of Horror X" premieres on Fox.

=== November ===
- November 12: The first episodes of Mike, Lu & Og and Courage the Cowardly Dog air on Cartoon Network.
- November 13: Toy Story 2 premieres in theaters.
- November 16: Duck Amuck was added to the National Film Registry.
- November 26: Season 2 of Ed, Edd n Eddy begins on Cartoon Network with the premiere of the episodes "Know It All Ed/Dear Ed".

=== December ===
- December 10: Dexter's Laboratory: Ego Trip airs on Cartoon Network. Unlike the then-popular television series, it doesn't do well in the full-length format.
- December 17: The Walt Disney Company releases Fantasia 2000, a sequel to the 1940 film Fantasia.
- December 26: The Family Guy episode "Da Boom" premieres on Fox, this episode marks the debut of Peter Griffin's recurring arch-nemesis, Ernie the Giant Chicken. It was seen by over 9.3 million viewers that night.
- December 29: The South Park episode "Are You There God? It's Me, Jesus" premieres on Comedy Central, this was the final episode to premiere in the 90s. It was seen by over 2.1 million viewers that night.

=== Specific date unknown ===
- Atomic Cartoons is founded.
- Augenblick Studios is founded.
- Cartoon Saloon is founded.
- JibJab is founded.
- Mark Baker releases Jolly Roger.

== Films released ==
- January 10 – Batman Beyond: The Movie (United States)
- January 12 – Our Friend, Martin (United States)
- February 23 – Sing a Song with Pooh Bear (United States)
- February 26 – Babar: King of the Elephants (Canada, France, and Germany)
- March 6 – Doraemon: Nobita Drifts in the Universe (Japan)
- March 9 – Tarzan of the Apes (United States)
- March 19 – The King and I (United States)
- March 20 – Gundress (Japan)
- March 26 – Doug's 1st Movie (United States)
- April 1 – Millionaire Dogs (Germany)
- April 2 – Marco: 3000 Leagues in Search of Mother (Japan)
- April 17:
  - Case Closed: The Last Wizard of the Century (Japan)
  - Crayon Shin-chan: Explosion! The Hot Spring's Feel Good Final Battle (Japan)
  - The Legend of the Titanic (Italy)
- April 23 – City Hunter: Death of the Vicious Criminal Ryo Saeba (Japan)
- April 24:
  - Tenchi Forever! The Movie (Japan)
  - You're Under Arrest: The Movie (Japan)
- June 2 – A Monkey's Tale (France, United Kingdom, Germany, and Hungary)
- June 8 – Flik's Musical Adventure at Disney's Animal Kingdom (United States)
- June 18 – Tarzan (United States)
- June 23 – Faeries (United Kingdom)
- June 30 – South Park: Bigger, Longer & Uncut (United States)
- July 6 – Puss in Boots (United States)
- July 8 – Manuelita (Argentina)
- July 9 – Goomer (Spain)
- July 10 – Carnivale (France and Ireland)
- July 17:
  - My Neighbors the Yamadas (Japan)
  - Pokémon: The Movie 2000 (Japan)
- July 24 – Soreike! Anpanman Yūki no Hana ga Hiraku Toki (Japan)
- July 27:
  - Happy Birthday: Inochi Kagayaku Toki (Japan)
  - VeggieTales: Larry-Boy and the Rumor Weed (United States)
- July 30:
  - Lotus Lantern (China)
  - Lupin III: The Columbus Files (Japan)
- July 31 – The Emperor's Treasure (United States)
- August 3 – Madeline: Lost in Paris (United States)
- August 6 – The Iron Giant (United States)
- August 14:
  - Cyber Team in Akihabara: Summer Vacation of 2011 (Japan)
  - Revolutionary Girl Utena: Adolescence of Utena (Japan)
- August 21:
  - Cardcaptor Sakura: The Movie (Japan)
  - The File of Young Kindaichi 2: Murderous Deep Blue (Japan)
- September 4 – Pippi Longstocking: Pippi's Adventures in the South Seas (Sweden)
- September 16 – Werner – Volles Rooäää!!! (Germany)
- September 25 – Break-Age (Japan)
- September 28 – Alvin and the Chipmunks Meet Frankenstein (United States)
- September 30 – Tobias Totz and His Lion (Germany)
- October 5 – Scooby-Doo! and the Witch's Ghost (United States)
- October 11:
  - Jack and the Beanstalk (United Kingdom)
  - Shōta no Sushi: Kokoro ni Hibiku Shari no Aji (Japan)
- October 19 – The Nuttiest Nutcracker (United States)
- October 22 – Anne Frank's Diary (United Kingdom, Ireland, France, Netherlands, and Luxembourg)
- November 9:
  - Mickey's Once Upon a Christmas (United States)
  - Winnie the Pooh: Seasons of Giving (United States)
- November 16 – Bartok the Magnificent (United States)
- November 17 – Jin-Roh: The Wolf Brigade (Japan)
- November 24 – Toy Story 2 (United States)
- December 3 – Cartoon Noir (United States)
- December 9 – An American Tail: The Mystery of the Night Monster (United States)
- December 10 – Dexter's Laboratory: Ego Trip (United States)
- December 16:
  - Captain Bluebear: The Film (Germany)
  - Mishy and Mushy (Hungary)
- December 17:
  - Fantasia 2000 (United States)
  - Olive, the Other Reindeer (United States)
- December 21 – Wakko's Wish (United States)
- December 23 – Kochira Katsushika-ku Kameari Kōen Mae Hashutsujo: The Movie (Japan)
- December 24 – Samurai Shodown 2: Asura Zanmaeden (Japan)
- December 25 – Pettson & Findus – The Cat and the Old Man Years (Sweden)
- December 27 – Die Reise zum Mond (China and Germany)
- Specific date unknown:
  - D4: The Trojan Dog (Australia)
  - Donkey Kong Country: The Legend of the Crystal Coconut (United States and Canada)
  - Snow White and the Frog King (China)
  - The Three Little Pigs (Australia)
  - Zeno – For the Infinity of Love (Japan)

== Television series debuts ==
Date	Title	Channel	Year
January 4	Ed, Edd n Eddy	Cartoon Network	1999–2009
January 5	Mega Babies	Fox Family	1999–2000
January 10	Batman Beyond	Kids' WB	1999–2001
January 10	The PJs	Fox	1999–2001
January 17	The Brothers Flub	Nickelodeon	1999–2000
January 17	Kevin Spencer	CTV	1999–2005
January 25	Zoboomafoo	PBS	1999–2001
January 25	Dilbert	UPN	1999–2000
January 31	Family Guy	Fox	1999–2003; 2005–present
February 1	A Little Curious	HBO	1999–2000
February 1	Crashbox	HBO	1999–2000
February 1	Anthony Ant	HBO	1999
February 11	Maisy	Nickelodeon	1999–2000
February 18	64 Zoo Lane	Der Kinderkanal/KIKA, France 3, CBeebies	1999–2003, 2010-2013
March 8	Station Zero	MTV	1999
March 28	Futurama	Fox	1999–2003
April 1	George and Martha	HBO	1999–2000
April 26	Home Movies	UPN	1999–2004
May 1	Mickey Mouse Works	ABC	1999–2000
May 1	SpongeBob SquarePants	Nickelodeon	1999–2004; 2005–present
May 8	The New Woody Woodpecker Show	Fox Kids	1999–2002
June 6	Phred on Your Head Show	Noggin	1999–2001
July 20	The Dick and Paula Celebrity Special	FX	1999
August 3	Downtown	MTV	1999
August 14	Digimon: Digital Monsters	Fox Kids	1999–2001
August 16	Rocket Power	Nickelodeon	1999–2004
August 30	Sonic Underground	Syndication	1999
August 31	Cybersix	Teletoon	1999
September 6	Dragon Tales	PBS Kids	1999–2005
September 6	Sabrina: The Animated Series	ABC, UPN	1999–2000
September 11	Detention	Kids' WB	1999–2000
September 18	Beast Machines: Transformers	Fox Kids	1999–2000
September 18	Big Guy and Rusty the Boy Robot	Fox Kids	1999–2001
September 18	Monster Rancher	Fox Kids	1999–2001
September 18	Rescue Heroes	CBS	1999–2000
September 18	Monster by Mistake	YTV	1999–2003
September 24	Mission Hill	The WB	1999–2002
September 25	Xyber 9: New Dawn	Fox Kids	1999
September 26	The Foxbusters	ITV, CITV	1999–2000
September 28	Watership Down	ITV, CITV	1999–2000
October 4	Angela Anaconda	Fox Family	1999–2001
November 12	Mike, Lu & Og	Cartoon Network	1999–2001
November 12	Courage the Cowardly Dog	Cartoon Network	1999–2002
November 28	Little Bill	Nickelodeon	1999–2004
November 29	Simsala Grimm	KIKA/NDR/ARD, ORF 1, RTÉ2, ABC Kids	1999–2010
December 4	Pokémon: Adventures in the Orange Islands	Kids' WB	1999–2000
December 4	Totally Tooned In	Syndication	1999–2000
December 5	Redwall	Teletoon	1999–2002
December 6	Spider-Man Unlimited	Fox, Fox Kids	1999–2001

== Television series endings ==
Date	Title	Channel	Year	Notes
January 1	Ned's Newt	Fox Kids	1998–1999	Cancelled
January 2	Birdz	CBS	1998–1999	Cancelled
January 2	Where on Earth Is Carmen Sandiego?	Fox Kids	1994–1999	Ended
January 16	The New Batman Adventures	Kids' WB	1997–1999	Cancelled
January 18	Toonsylvania	Fox Kids	1998–1999	Cancelled
January 20	Brats of the Lost Nebula	Kids' WB	1998–1999	Cancelled
February 21	The Little Lulu Show	HBO	1995–1999	Ended
February 27	Mad Jack the Pirate	Fox Kids	1998–1999	Cancelled
February 27	The Mr. Potato Head Show	Fox Kids	1998–1999	Cancelled
March 1	Hercules	ABC	1998–1999	Cancelled
March 7	Beast Wars: Transformers	Fox Kids	1996–1999	Cancelled
March 11	Jumanji	UPN	1996–1999	Cancelled
April 6	Station Zero	MTV	1999	Cancelled
April 10	Pinky, Elmyra & the Brain	Kids' WB	1998–1999	Cancelled
April 11	Anthony Ant	HBO	1999	Cancelled
May 6	ReBoot	ABC, Syndication	1994–1999	Cancelled, until revived by Cartoon Network in 2001.
May 28	Todd McFarlane's Spawn	HBO	1997–1999	Cancelled
June 26	Brand Spankin' New! Doug	ABC	1996–1999	Ended
July 24	Cow and Chicken	Cartoon Network	1997–1999	Cancelled
September 21	The Dick and Paula Celebrity Special	FX	1999	Cancelled
September 24	Timon & Pumbaa	CBS, Toon Disney	1995–1999	Ended
November 8	Downtown	MTV	1999	Cancelled
December 4	Tales from the Cryptkeeper	ABC	1993–1999	Ended
December 4	Xyber 9: New Dawn	Fox Kids	1999	Cancelled
December 10	Dexter's Laboratory	Cartoon Network	1996–1999; 2001–2003	Cancelled, until revived in 2001.
December 17	Space Ghost Coast to Coast	Cartoon Network	1994–1999	Ended, until revived by Adult Swim in 2001.

== Television season premieres ==
Date	Title	Season	Channel
January 18	Rugrats	6	Nickelodeon
February 15	CatDog	2	Nickelodeon
March 10	Hey Arnold!	4	Nickelodeon
March 14	The Angry Beavers	3	Nickelodeon
April 7	South Park	3	Comedy Central
April 26	Cow and Chicken	4	Cartoon Network
June 25	The Powerpuff Girls	2	Cartoon Network
July 2	Johnny Bravo	2	Cartoon Network
August 16	The Wild Thornberrys	2	Nickelodeon
September 11	Recess	3	ABC/UPN
September 19	The Sylvester & Tweety Mysteries	5	Kids' WB (The WB)
September 23	Family Guy	2	Fox
September 26	King of the Hill	4	Fox
September 26	The Simpsons	11	Fox
November 21	Futurama	2	Fox
November 26	Ed, Edd n Eddy	2	Cartoon Network

== Television season finales ==
Date	Title	Season	Channel
January 20	South Park	2	Comedy Central
February 27	Recess	2	ABC
March 8	Hey Arnold!	3	Nickelodeon
April 1	The Wild Thornberrys	1	Nickelodeon
May 3	Cow and Chicken	3	Cartoon Network
May 16	Family Guy	1	Fox
May 16	The Simpsons	10	Fox
May 16	The Sylvester & Tweety Mysteries	4	Kids' WB (The WB)
May 18	King of the Hill	3	Fox
May 26	The Powerpuff Girls	1	Cartoon Network
June 11	Ed, Edd n Eddy	1	Cartoon Network
November 14	Futurama	1	Fox

== Births ==
=== January ===
- January 1: Diamond White, American singer and actress (voice of Frankee Greene in Transformers: Rescue Bots, Fuli in The Lion Guard, Ruby in Sofia the First, Lunella Lafayette / Moon Girl in Moon Girl and Devil Dinosaur).
- January 4: Gage Munroe, Canadian actor (voice of George Ridgemount in Stoked, Matt in My Big Big Friend, the title character in Mr Moon, Jake in Babar and the Adventures of Badou, the title character in Justin Time, Marshall in season 1 of PAW Patrol, Danny Chase in Lucky Duck, Jim Hawkins in Pirate's Passage, Prince Ferg in Little Charmers, Hank in Hotel Transylvania: The Series, Dragon in the Super Why! episode "The Big Game", Steve in the Doodlebops Rockin' Road Show episode "Stand Up Funny", Mick Mallory in the Grojband episode "Super Zeroes", Mikey in the Ella the Elephant episode "Ella's Special Delivery", Wayne Whale in the Little People episode "Potty Ahoy!").
- January 18: Karan Brar, American actor (voice of Veer in Mira, Royal Detective, Zandar in Sofia the First, Ravi Ross in the Ultimate Spider-Man episode "Halloween Night at the Museum").
- January 28: Preston Strother, American actor (voice of Fox in Ni Hao, Kai-Lan, Arthur Jr. in Batman: The Brave and the Bold).

=== February ===
- February 7: Bea Miller, American singer and actress (voice of Molly in Toy Story 3, Virginia in Yes, Virginia).
- February 10: Tiffany Espensen, American actress (voice of Ginger Hirano in Phineas and Ferb, Rama in The Lion Guard, Ming Long-Dou in The Boondocks episode "The Red Ball").
- February 19: Quinn Lord, Canadian actor (voice of young Leo in Edison and Leo, Jason in 3-2-1 Penguins!, Linus Van Pelt in Peanuts Motion Comics, Hardy the Hippo in the ToddWorld episode "Whatever Sways Your Swing").

=== March ===
- March 25: Mikey Madison, American actress (voice of Candi the Barista in The Addams Family).

=== April ===
- April 6: Kwesi Boakye, American actor (voice of Darwin Watterson in seasons 1–3 of The Amazing World of Gumball, Gossamer in The Looney Tunes Show, Benji Nichols in Costume Quest, Mr. Hoppy in Ni Hao, Kai-Lan, Newspaper Boy in The Princess and the Frog, Andrew in the Special Agent Oso episode "Thunderbubble", additional voices in Happy Feet).

=== May ===
- May 11: Sabrina Carpenter, American actress (voice of Melissa Chase in Milo Murphy's Law, Vivian in Sofia the First, Melodie in the Wander Over Yonder episode "The Legend", Nina Glitter in the Mickey Mouse Mixed-Up Adventures episode "Super-Charged: Pop Star Helpers").
- May 25: Brec Bassinger, American actress (voice of Margo Roberts in The Loud House, Willow Jasmine in Dew Drop Diaries).
- May 28: Cameron Boyce, American actor (voice of Jake in seasons 2–3 of Jake and the Never Land Pirates, Carlos in Descendants: Wicked World, Luke Ross in the Ultimate Spider-Man episode "Halloween Night at the Museum", Shocker in the Spider-Man episode "Osborn Academy"), (d. 2019).
- May 30: Sean Giambrone, American actor (voice of Jeff Randell in Clarence, Ant-Man in Spidey and His Amazing Friends, Richardson Mole in Big Hero 6: The Series, Travis in The Emoji Movie, Shermy in the Adventure Time episode "Come Along With Me", eBoy in Ralph Breaks the Internet, Yumyulack Opposites Jr. in Solar Opposites, Ben Pincus in Jurassic World Camp Cretaceous, Jimmy McGill in Slippin' Jimmy, Riley in The Chicken Squad).

=== June ===
- June 3: Alicia Vélez, Mexican voice actor and daughter of Humberto Vélez (dub voice of Boo in Monsters, Inc., Daisy in Spirit Riding Free, Lena De Spell in DuckTales, Karmi in Big Hero 6: The Series, Pippa Powers in Mickey and the Roadster Racers, Shiera Sanders in DC Super Hero Girls, Martin Prince and Sherri and Terri in season 32-present of The Simpsons, Doctor Octopus in Spidey and His Amazing Friends).
- June 27: Chandler Riggs, American actor and DJ (voice of Carl Grimes in the Robot Chicken episode "The Robot Chicken Walking Dead Special: Look Who's Walking").

=== July ===
- July 9: Claire Corlett, Canadian actress (voice of Sweetie Belle in My Little Pony: Friendship is Magic, Tiny Pteranodon in Dinosaur Train).
- July 30: Joey King, American actress (voice of Katie in Horton Hears a Who!, Jessie Alden in The Boxcar Children and The Boxcar Children: Surprise Island, Gigi in Yellowbird, Fred Grant in Hamster & Gretel, Addy in The Simpsons episode "The Hateful Eight-Year-Olds", Poppy Prescott in Despicable Me 4).

=== August ===
- August 22:
  - Ricardo Hurtado, American actor (voice of Hector "High Five" Nieves in Glitch Techs, Rich Belcher in Ron's Gone Wrong).
  - Dakota Goyo, Canadian actor (voice of Jamie Bennett in Rise of the Guardians, Little Blue in the JoJo's Circus episode "The Thanksgiving Parade").

=== September ===
- September 7: Michelle Creber, Canadian actress and singer (voice of Apple Bloom in My Little Pony: Friendship is Magic).

=== November ===
- November 10:
  - Michael Cimino, American actor (voice of Kevin Grant-Gomez in Hamster & Gretel, Eduardo in Moon Girl and Devil Dinosaur).
  - Kiernan Shipka, American actress (voice of Marnie in When Marnie Was There, Jinora in The Legend of Korra, Oona in Sofia the First).
- November 23: Nikki Castillo, American actress (voice of Betsy and Sarah in Summer Camp Island, the title character in Pibby, continued voice of Gabriella in Big City Greens).

=== December ===
- December 19: Beverly Duan, American actress (voice of Lulu in Ni Hao, Kai-Lan)

== Deaths ==
=== January ===
- January 2: Shepard Menken, American actor (voice of Clyde Crashcup in The Alvin Show, Tonto in The Lone Ranger, the Spelling Bee and Chroma the Great in The Phantom Tollbooth, the title character in Riki Tiki Tavi, Doctor Doom in Spider-Man and His Amazing Friends, Old Storyteller in Bugs Bunny's 3rd Movie: 1001 Rabbit Tales), dies at age 77.
- January 11: John McGrew, American animator, painter and musician (Warner Bros. Cartoons), dies at age 88 or 89.
- January 12: Betty Lou Gerson, American actress (narrator in Cinderella, voice of Cruella de Vil in One Hundred and One Dalmatians), dies at age 84.

=== February ===
- February 3: Herbert Klynn, American animator (UPA, founder of Format Films), dies at age 81.

=== March ===
- March 2: Hawley Pratt, American film director, lay-out artist, illustrator and animator (Walt Disney Company, Warner Bros. Cartoons, Hanna-Barbera, Filmation, DePatie-Freleng Enterprises), dies at age 87.

=== April ===
- April 1: Tadahito Mochinaga, Japanese animator and animation director (Manchukuo Film Association, Rankin/Bass), dies at age 80.
- April 3:
  - Evelyn Lambart, Canadian animator and film director (Begone Dull Care, A Chairy Tale), dies at age 84.
  - Kay Wright, American animator, television producer and comics artist (Walt Disney Company, Cambria Productions, Filmation, Hanna-Barbera), dies at age 79.
- April 10:
  - Cliff Roberts, American photographer, cartoonist, animator and comics artist (Hanna-Barbera, DePatie-Freleng), dies at age 69.
  - Jean Vander Pyl, American actress (voice of Wilma Flintstone and Pebbles Flintstone in The Flintstones, Rosie the Robot Maid in The Jetsons, Goldie, Lola Glamour, Nurse LaRue in Top Cat, Winsome Witch in The Secret Squirrel Show, Ogee in Magilla Gorilla), dies at age 79 from lung cancer.
- April 14: Vic Herman, American illustrator, designer, cartoonist, puppeteer, television producer, and comics artist (designed title cards for Merrie Melodies), dies at age 79.
- April 16:
  - Regis Cordic, American actor (voice of Diablo in Fantastic Four, Apache Chief and Black Manta in The All-New Super Friends Hour, Bald Doctor in Puff the Magic Dragon, The Clock in The Mouse and His Child, Quintessons and Menasor in The Transformers), dies at age 72.
  - Charles McKimson, American animator and comics artist (Warner Bros. Cartoons), dies at age 84.

=== May ===
- May 8: Ed Gilbert, American actor (voice of Baloo in TaleSpin, Thrust and Blitzwing in The Transformers, Pugsy and Daddy Sterling in Tom and Jerry: The Movie, Mr. Smee in Peter Pan and the Pirates, Looten Plunder in Captain Planet and the Planeteers, Professor Heiny in Freakazoid!, Dormammu in Spider-Man, the Mandarin in season 1 of Iron Man), dies at age 67.
- May 19: Candy Candido, American singer, musician, and actor (voice of the Native American chief in Peter Pan, Awful Dynn in The Phantom Tollbooth, crocodile captain in Robin Hood, Mafia messenger in Heavy Traffic, Sal in Hey Good Lookin', Fidget in The Great Mouse Detective), dies at age 85.

=== June ===
- June 11: DeForest Kelley, American actor (voice of Dr. Leonard McCoy in Star Trek: The Animated Series, Viking 1 in The Brave Little Toaster Goes to Mars), dies at age 79.
- June 13: Douglas Seale, English actor, film producer, and director (voice of Krebbs in The Rescuers Down Under, the Sultan in Aladdin), dies at age 85.
- June 21: Tobin Wolf, American writer (creator of ThunderCats), dies at age 76.

=== August ===
- August 7: Brion James, American actor (voice of Rudy Jones / Parasite in Superman: The Animated Series), dies at age 54.
- August 9: Lou Lilly, American animator and film director (Warner Bros. Cartoons), dies at age 90.
- August 16: David W. Allen, American animator (When Dinosaurs Ruled the Earth, Laserblast, The Howling, Twilight Zone: The Movie, Honey, I Shrunk the Kids, Puppet Master), dies at age 54.
- August 20: Margaret Wright, American actress (voice of Casey Junior in Dumbo), dies from heart failure at age 82.
- August 27: Ponsonby Britt, American fictional television producer (Jay Ward Productions, The Phox, the Box, and the Lox), was retired at age 40.

=== September ===
- September 22: George C. Scott, American actor (voice of Smoke in Cartoon All-Stars to the Rescue, Percival McLeach in The Rescuers Down Under), dies at age 71.

=== October ===
- October 12: Wilt Chamberlain, American former professional basketball player (voiced himself in the Goober and the Ghost Chasers episode "The Galloping Ghost"), dies at age 63.
- October 15: Terry Gilkyson, American lyricist (wrote "The Bare Necessities" from The Jungle Book), dies at age 83.
- October 18:
  - Dallas Bower, English film and television director and producer (Alice in Wonderland), dies at age 92.
  - Paddi Edwards, English actress (voice of Flotsam and Jetsam in The Little Mermaid, Twinkle the Bag Lady in Edith Ann: Homeless Go Home, Gloria in Phantom 2040, Lab Computer in The Brave Little Toaster to the Rescue, Satellite 1 in The Brave Little Toaster Goes to Mars, Atrophos in Hercules, Lucy in 101 Dalmatians: The Series, Vera in Pepper Ann, Maggie Pie in the Batman: The Animated Series episode "Eternal Youth"), dies at age 67.
- October 29: Greg, Belgian comics artist, writer and screenplay writer (Tintin and the Temple of the Sun, Tintin and the Lake of Sharks), dies at age 68.

=== November ===
- November 12: Mary Kay Bergman, American actress (voice of the Bimbettes in Beauty and the Beast, Quasimodo's mother in The Hunchback of Notre Dame, Liane Cartman, Sheila Broflovski, Shelly Marsh, Sharon Marsh, Mrs. McCormick and Wendy Testaburger in South Park, Banshee in Extreme Ghostbusters, Barbara Gordon/Batgirl in Batman & Mr. Freeze: SubZero, Timmy Turner in Oh Yeah! Cartoons, Gwen Stacy in the Spider-Man episode "Farewell Spider-Man", continued voice of Dr. Blight in Captain Planet and the Planeteers and Daphne Blake in Scooby-Doo), dies at age 38.
- November 14: Giorgio Bordini, Italian comics artist, animator and illustrator (La Piccola Fiammiferaia), dies at age 72.

=== December ===
- December 3: Madeline Kahn, American actress, comedian and singer (voice of Draggle in My Little Pony: The Movie, Gussie Mausheimer in An American Tail, Gypsy in A Bug's Life, Mrs. Shapiro in the Little Bill episode "The Campout"), dies at age 57.
- December 10: Al Stahl, American animator and comics artist (Terrytoons, Fleischer Brothers, Stahl's Animated Productions), dies at age 83.
- December 17: Rex Allen, American actor (narrator and voice of the title character in The Saga of Windwagon Smith, the narrator in Charlotte's Web), dies at age 79.
- December 31:
  - Arthur Humberstone, English animator and film director (Halas & Batchelor, Animal Farm, Yellow Submarine, Watership Down, The Plague Dogs, The BFG), dies at age 87.
  - Dean Elliott, American composer (Chuck Jones, DePatie-Freleng Enterprises, Ruby-Spears Enterprises), dies at age 82.

=== Specific date unknown ===
- Reg Hill, English model-maker, animator, director and producer (worked for Gerry Anderson), dies at age 85.

== See also ==
- 1999 in anime
