= John Palumbo =

American author, businessman and professional speaker

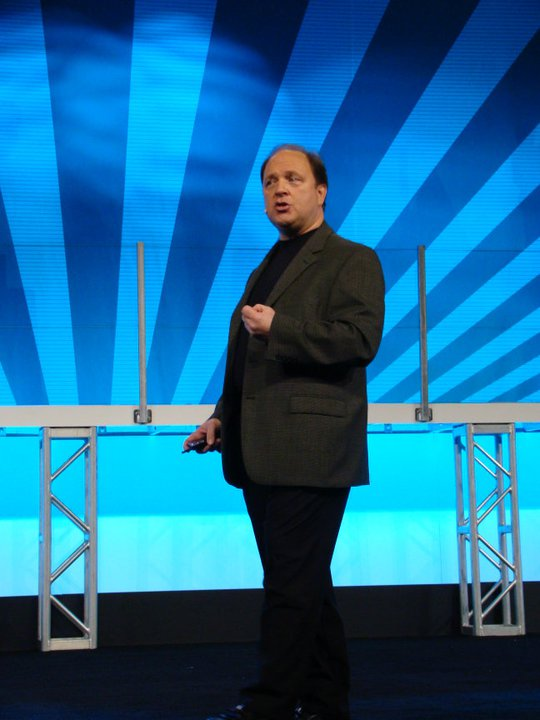
- Palumbo presenting at the National Association of Home Builders' International Builders' Show in 2018
- Born: John Anthony Palumbo; 1956 (age 69–70); Birmingham, Alabama
- Occupations: Author, professional speaker, businessman
- Notable work: SalesNosis: The Art of Hypnotic Persuasion; Highly Influential; What's Your Sales DNA?
- Website: www.johnpalumbo.com

John Anthony Palumbo (born 1956 in Birmingham, Alabama) is an American author, businessman and professional speaker who writes and lectures internationally on consumer behavior, sales psychology, and personal development. He is based in Jacksonville, Florida.

== Life and career ==
Palumbo is the owner and chief executive officer of The Sterling Group, Inc. a company he founded in 1982. Headquartered in Jacksonville, Florida, the company provides consulting on leadership, management, sales and marketing, and real estate project development. He works with a group of international builders and developers including from North America, Europe, and South America.

He is a member of and instructor for the National Association of Home Builders Institute of Residential Marketing (IRM). Palumbo often serves as a guest keynote speaker at new home sales conferences and national conventions including the International Builders' Show (IBS), Super Sales Rally, Southeast Building Conference (SEBC), and the Midwest Builders’ Conference. In 2020, his daughter, Morgan Palumbo, joined him onstage to present The UnSalesperson at the International Builders’ Show.

Palumbo has developed proprietary educational programs that have been approved by real estate licensing agencies to educate real estate brokers and realtors. He has written several books on sales psychology, consumer behavior, and the science of influence and persuasion including What's Your Sales DNA?. Palumbo is the CEO of The Sales DNA Institute and has been interviewed as an expert in the art of influence and persuasion by a number of publications including the Wall Street Journal. Palumbo has also appeared on numerous podcasts and radio shows, including Polish National Radio and Builder Radio.

On July 26, 2016, Palumbo received the Certified Speaking Professional (CSP) Award designation which was conferred by the National Speakers Association.

== Television guest expert ==
On November 10, 2003, television news anchor Staci Spanos introduced Palumbo as "America's Investment Gambler" on the Jacksonville, Florida television station, WJXT. Palumbo appeared on WJXT's The Morning Show over 70 more times between 2003 and 2009 as a regular contributing guest in a segment called "The Investment Gambler".

== Asset management ==
Palumbo is the principal of Bankruptcy Asset Management, a company which targets the acquisition of undervalued and unusual assets. In 2002, the company acquired the royalty rights for deceased Roots author, Alex Haley, and currently includes songs by Johnny Cash, Dwight Yoakam, and Tammy Wynette. Serving attorneys, CPAs, and bank trust officers, Palumbo consults on matters of bankruptcy, probate, and trust estates with banks. He serves in court as an expert witness for his knowledge in the valuation, liquidation, and disposition of complex assets.

Palumbo is a member of the National Association of Bankruptcy Trustees (NABT) and is invited regularly to their Spring Seminars and Annual Conventions as an expert speaker and panelist. He has written articles on the topic of recognizing value in items typically dismissed as worthless. Palumbo's articles have been featured in the official publication for the NABT, the American Bankruptcy Trustee Journal (formerly NABTalk).

== Real estate ==
Palumbo serves as an advisor for commercial banks, private estate matters, and the U.S. court system in the administration of foreign asset analysis, valuation, and recovery. He is known as a “Global Bargain Hunter” for his experience in assessing the risk and viability of buying and selling real estate internationally. He is a speaker in the field, along with being a guest contributor to Live and Invest Overseas forums and The Expat Money Show.

== Executive producer ==
=== Singing in Color ===
In September 1998, Palumbo became Executive Producer and owner of the video documentary, "Singing in Color." The film "Singing in Color", directed by Bruce Weinstein, shows how music is a vehicle for the message of peace. It tells the story of the Chicago Children's Choir's historic tour of South Africa, including a personal visit with Nelson Mandela, in the summer of 1996. The film is sold at the choir's performances and proceeds support the operation of the choir.

=== America's Dumbest Criminals ===
In September 2003, Palumbo became Executive Producer of the syndicated television series America's Dumbest Criminals after acquiring all television rights, trademarks, and copyrights from the Entheos Group based in Nashville, Tennessee.

“America's Dumbest Criminals" racked up high ratings in its first four seasons in the United States. The series has since syndicated airings in more than 30 countries, according to New York-based Lacey Entertainment, which markets and distributes the series worldwide. The show has continued to enjoy global success with its 104 episodes, including video series, books, and apparel.

== Honors, designations, and awards ==
- Sales Manager of the Year Award – National Association of Home Builders
- Million Dollar Circle Lifetime Award – National Association of Home Builders
- Certified New Home Marketing Professional (CMP) – National Association of Home Builders
- Master, Institute of Residential Marketing (MIRM) – National Association of Home Builders
- Board of Governors – Institute of Residential Marketing
- Certified Speaking Professional (CSP) Award/Designation – National Speakers Association
- 2016 John P. Hall Outstanding Achievement in Sales and Marketing Award – Florida Sales and Marketing Council
- Order of Merlin Excalibur – International Brotherhood of Magicians
- 2018 Chairman's Lifetime Achievement Award – National Association of Home Builders’ National Sales and Marketing Council (NSMC)

== Bibliography ==
=== Books ===
- Palumbo, John (2007). What's Your Sales DNA?. Jacksonville, FL: Sterling Learning Group. pp. 205 pages. ISBN 978-1934381007.
- Palumbo, John (2009). Close and Grow Rich. Jacksonville, FL: Sterling Learning Group. pp. 192 pages. ISBN 978-1934381014.
- Palumbo, John (2009). The Closing Numbers. Jacksonville, FL: Sterling Learning Group. pp. 144 pages. ISBN 978-1934381038.
- Palumbo, John (2009). Selling at the Bottom of the Market. Jacksonville, FL: Sterling Learning Group. pp. 48 pages. ISBN 978-1934381021.
- Palumbo, John (2012). 37 Closing Rules to Live (or Die) By. Jacksonville, FL: Sterling Learning Group. pp. 192 pages. ASIN B007Y801VO.
- Palumbo, John (2013). Selling at the Top, Middle, or Bottom of Any Market. Jacksonville, FL: Sterling Learning Group. pp. 192 pages. ASIN B00BY9TYX0.
- Palumbo, John (2014). SalesNosis: The Art of Hypnotic Persuasion. Jacksonville, FL: Sterling Learning Group. pp. 144 pages. ISBN 978-1-934381-18-2.
- Palumbo, John (2016). Sell the Results. Jacksonville, FL: Sterling Learning Group. pp. 202 pages. ISBN 978-1-934381-20-5.
- Palumbo, John (2018). Highly Influential. Jacksonville, FL: Sterling Learning Group. pp. 240 pages. ISBN 978-1-934381-25-0.
- Palumbo, John (2022). Becoming the UnSalesperson. Jacksonville, FL: Sterling Learning Group. pp. 242 pages. ISBN 978-1-934381-31-1.
- Palumbo, John (2023). Highly Persuasive. Jacksonville, FL: Sterling Learning Group. pp. 222 pages. ISBN 978-1-934381-34-2.

=== Audio books ===
- Palumbo, John (November 1, 2010). Close and Grow Rich: Fourteen Untapped Powers You Already Have To Close Your Next Deal. Sterling Learning Group. ISBN 978-1-93438-1-07-6.

=== e-Books ===
- Palumbo, John. Honey, I Shrunk The Mortgage (2003). Jacksonville, Florida. Sterling Learning Group.
- Palumbo, John. Invest in Yourself (2003). Jacksonville, Florida. Sterling Learning Group.
- Palumbo, John. 7 Hidden Advantages of Preconstruction Purchases (2003). Jacksonville, Florida. Sterling Learning Group.
- Palumbo, John. How To Build A Fortune Using A Self Directed IRA (2004). Jacksonville, Florida. Sterling Learning Group.
- Palumbo, John. Sell it Yourself (2004). Jacksonville, Florida. Sterling Learning Group.
- Palumbo, John. Amazing Car Secrets (2006). Jacksonville, Florida. Sterling Learning Group.
- Palumbo, John. Building Wealth With Tax Liens Certificates (2006). Jacksonville, Florida. Sterling Learning Group.

=== Journal articles ===
- Palumbo, John. "Long-term Thinking Creates Short-term Gains for the Estate". American Bankruptcy Trustee Journal. Volume 36, Issue 01, Spring 2020.
- Palumbo, John. "Confessions of a Foreign Asset Bounty Hunter". American Bankruptcy Trustee Journal. Volume 34, Issue 02, Spring 2018.
- Palumbo, John. "Ten Strategies to Triumph Over". Timeshares.
- Palumbo, John. "Interesting Assets: Find ‘Em, Liquidate “Em". NABT: Journal of the National Association of Bankruptcy Trustees. Volume 24, Issue 03, Fall 2008.
- Palumbo, John. "The Top 10 Assets Most Likely to be Abandoned (but shouldn't be)". NABT: Journal of the National Association of Bankruptcy Trustees. Volume 22, Issue 03, Winter 2006.
- Palumbo, John. "Turning the Unusual Into the Usual". NABT: Journal of the National Association of Bankruptcy Trustees. Volume 19, Issue 03, Fall 2003.

=== e-Program ===
- Palumbo, John. 52 Selling Ideas (2020). Jacksonville, Florida. Sterling Learning Group. ISBN 978-1-934381-29-8
- Palumbo, John. Becoming the UnSalesperson (2022). Jacksonville, Florida. Sterling Learning Group. ISBN 978-1-934381-38-0

== Discography ==
=== Audio/CDs ===
- ClosingNomics: Sell More, Close More, Earn More (2012). Jacksonville, FL: Sterling Learning Group. ISBN 978-1-934381-12-0.
- Sell the Results: An Audio Companion (2016). Jacksonville, FL: Sterling Learning Group. ISBN 978-1-934381-23-6.
- Overcoming the 9 Biggest Negotiation Deal Breakers (2017). Jacksonville, FL: Sterling Learning Group. ISBN 978-1-934381-24-3.
- Highly Influential: An Audio Companion (2018). Jacksonville, FL: Sterling Learning Group. ISBN 978-1-934381-28-1.
- Highly Persuasive: An Audio Companion (2023). Jacksonville, FL: Sterling Learning Group. ISBN 978-1-934381-37-3.

=== Video/DVDs ===
- Sales Expert Academy. (2010). Jacksonville, Florida. Sterling Learning Group.
