= 1999 in Japanese television =

Events in 1999 in Japanese television.

== Debuts ==
Show	Station	Premiere Date	Genre	Original Run
Betterman	TV Tokyo	April 1	anime	April 1, 1999 – September 30, 1999
Blue Gender	TBS	October 7	anime	October 7, 1999 - March 30, 2000
Di Gi Charat	TBS	November 29	anime	November 29, 1999 - December 23, 1999
Digimon Adventure	Fuji TV	March 7	anime	March 7, 1999 – March 26, 2000
Hoshin Engi	TV Tokyo	July 3	anime	July 3, 1999 - December 25, 1999
Hunter × Hunter	Fuji TV	October 16	anime	October 16, 1999 - March 31, 2001
Initial D: Second Stage	Fuji TV	October 14	anime	October 14, 1999 - January 6, 2000
Jibaku-kun	TV Tokyo	October 5	anime	October 5, 1999 - March 28, 2000
Kamikaze Kaito Jeanne	TV Asahi	February 13	anime	February 13, 1999 – January 29, 2000
Kitty's Paradise	TV Tokyo	January 5	children's variety	January 5, 1999 - September 28, 1999
Kitty's Paradise II	TV Tokyo	October 5	children's variety	October 5, 1999 - March 28, 2000
Kyorochan	TV Tokyo	July 1	anime	July 1, 1999 - March 29, 2001
Kyuukyuu Sentai GoGoFive	TV Asahi	February 21	tokusatsu	February 21, 1999 – February 6, 2000
Majo no Jōken	TBS	April 8	drama	April 8, 1999 - June 17, 1999
Moero!! Robocon	TV Asahi	January 31	tokusatsu	January 31, 1999 – January 23, 2000
Monster Farm	TBS	April 17	anime	April 17, 1999 – September 30, 2001
Ojamajo Doremi	TV Asahi	February 7	anime	February 7, 1999 - January 30, 2000
One Piece	Fuji TV	October 20	anime	October 20, 1999 – present
Power Stone	TBS	April 3	anime	April 3, 1999 - September 25, 1999
Sorcerous Stabber Orphen 2: Revenge	TBS	October 2	anime	October 2, 1999 – March 26, 2000
Super Life-Form Transformers: Beast Wars Neo	TV Tokyo	February 3	anime	February 3, 1999 - September 29, 1999
Trouble Chocolate	TV Asahi	October 8	anime	October 8, 1999 - March 24, 2000
Ultraman Nice	CBC	October 20	tokusatsu	October 20, 1999 – September 28, 2000

== Ongoing shows ==
- Music Fair, music (1964–present)
- Mito Kōmon, jidaigeki (1969-2011)
- Sazae-san, anime (1969–present)
- FNS Music Festival, music (1974–present)
- Panel Quiz Attack 25, game show (1975–present)
- Doraemon, anime (1979-2005)
- Soreike! Anpanman, anime (1988–present)
- Downtown no Gaki no Tsukai ya Arahende!!, game show (1989–present)
- Crayon Shin-chan, anime (1992–present)
- Shima Shima Tora no Shimajirō, anime (1993-2008)
- Nintama Rantarō, anime (1993–present)
- Chibi Maruko-chan, anime (1995–present)
- Kochira Katsushika-ku Kameari Kōen-mae Hashutsujo, anime (1996-2004)
- Detective Conan, anime (1996–present)
- SASUKE, sports (1997–present)
- Ojarumaru, anime (1998–present)
- Pocket Monsters, anime (1997-2002)

== Hiatus ==
Show	Station	Hiatus Date	Genre	Original Run
Cardcaptor Sakura	NHK BS2	June 22	anime	April 7, 1998 - June 22, 1999

== Returning ==
Show	Station	Resume Date	Genre	Original Run
Cardcaptor Sakura	NHK BS2	September 7	anime	September 7, 1999 – March 21, 2000

== Endings ==
Show	Station	Ending Date	Genre	Original Run
Beast Wars II: Super Life-Form Transformers	TV Tokyo	January 27	anime	April 1, 1998 – January 27, 1999
Betterman	TV Tokyo	September 30	anime	April 1, 1999 – September 30, 1999
Di Gi Charat	TBS	December 23	anime	November 29, 1999 - December 23, 1999
Doctor Slump (remake)	Fuji TV	September 22	anime (remake)	November 26, 1997 – September 22, 1999
Iron Chef	Fuji TV	September 24	cooking show	October 10, 1993 - September 24, 1999
Kitty's Paradise	TV Tokyo	September 28	children's variety	January 5, 1999 - September 28, 1999
Hoshin Engi	TV Tokyo	December 25	anime	July 3, 1999 - December 25, 1999
Master Keaton	Nippon TV	March 29	anime	October 5, 1998 – March 29, 1999
Majo no Jōken	TBS	June 17	drama	April 8, 1999 - June 17, 1999
Ōoka Echizen	TBS	March 16	jidaigeki	March 16, 1970 – March 15, 1999
Power Stone	TBS	September 25	anime	April 3, 1999 - September 25, 1999
Seijuu Sentai Gingaman	TV Asahi	February 14	tokusatsu	February 22, 1998 – February 14, 1999
Sorcerous Stabber Orphen	TBS	March 27	anime	October 3, 1998 – March 27, 1999
Super Doll Licca-chan	TV Tokyo	September 28	anime	October 6, 1998 - September 28, 1999
Super Life-Form Transformers: Beast Wars Neo	TV Tokyo	September 29	anime	February 3, 1999 - September 29, 1999
Ultraman Gaia	MBS	August 28	tokusatsu	September 5, 1998 – August 28, 1999
You're Under Arrest	TBS	April 29	anime	March 29, 1999 – April 29, 1999

== See also ==
- 1999 in anime
- List of Japanese television dramas
- 1999 in Japan
- List of Japanese films of 1999
