= 1999 in anime =

The events of 1999 in anime.

== Accolades ==
At the Mainichi Film Awards, Jin-Roh: The Wolf Brigade won the Animation Film Award and The Old Man and the Sea won the Ōfuji Noburō Award. Internationally, The Old Man and the Sea also won the Academy Award for Best Animated Short Film.

== Releases ==
Released	English name	Japanese name	Type	Studio	Demographic	Regions	Ref
October 8	Trouble Chocolate	トラブルチョコレート (Toraburu Chokorēto)	TV	AIC, ROBOT, Hakusensha, Step Visual Corporation			
July 23	Ten Tokyo Warriors	倒凶十将伝 (Tokyo Juushouden)	OVA				
April 7	A.D. Police: To Protect and Serve	アドバンスドポリス (Adobansudo Porisu)	TV	AIC			
July 5	Amazing Nurse Nanako	菜々子解体診書 (Nanako Kaitai Shinsho)	OVA	RADIX			
April 7	Angel Links	星方天使エンジェルリンクス (Seihō Tenshi Enjeru Rinkusu)	TV	Sunrise, Bandai Visual			
April 5	Arc the Lad	アークザラッド (Āku za raddo)	TV	Bee Train			
July 8	Black Heaven	課長王子 (Kachō-Ōji)	TV	AIC, APPP			
October 8	Blue Gender	ブルージェンダー (Burū Jendā)	TV	AIC			
September 25	Break-Age	ブレイクエイジ	OVA	Beam Entertainment			
October 5	Bucky: The Incredible Kid	ジバクくん TWELVE WORLDS STORY (Jibaku-kun: Tuerubu Wārudo Sutōrī)	TV	Trans Arts			
August 21	Cardcaptor Sakura: The Movie	劇場版カードキャプターさくら (Gekijō-ban Kādokyaputā Sakura)	Movie	Madhouse			
April 17	Case Closed: The Last Wizard of the Century	名探偵コナン 世紀末の魔術師 (Meitantei Konan: Seikimatsu no Majutsushi)	Movie	TMS Entertainment			
April 23	City Hunter: Death of the Vicious Criminal Ryo Saeba	シティーハンター 緊急生中継！？ 凶悪犯冴羽獠の最期 (City Hunter Special: Kinkyū Seichūkei!? Kyōakuhan Saeba Ryo no Saigo)	TV	Sunrise			
April 2	Corrector Yui	コレクター・ユイ (Korekutā Yui)	TV	Nippon Animation			
April 2	To Heart		TV	OLM, Inc.			
April 17	Crayon Shin-chan: Explosion! The Hot Spring's Feel Good Final Battle	クレヨンしんちゃん 爆発!温泉わくわく大決戦 (Kureyon Shinchan: Bakuhatsu! Onsen Wakuwaku Daikessen)	Movie	Shin-Ei Animation			
January 3	Crest of the Stars	星界の紋章 (Seikai no Monshō)	TV	Sunrise			
August 14	Cyber Team in Akihabara: Summer Vacation of 2011	劇場版 アキハバラ電脳組 2011年の夏休み (Akihabara Dennō Gumi: 2011 Nen no Natsuyasumi)	Movie	Production I.G, Xebec			
October 2	Cyborg Kuro-chan	サイボーグクロちゃん (Saibōgu Kurochan)	TV	Studio Bogey			
November 30	Di Gi Charat	デ・ジ・キャラット (De Ji Kyaratto)	TV	Madhouse			
March 6	Digimon Adventure	デジモンアドベンチャー (Dejimon Adobenchā)	Movie	Toei Animation			
March 7	Digimon Adventure	デジモンアドベンチャー (Dejimon Adobenchā)	TV	Toei Animation			
April 6	Juubee-chan: Lovely Gantai no Himitsu		TV				
March 6	Doraemon: Nobita Drifts in the Universe	ドラえもん のび太の宇宙漂流記 (Doraemon: Nobita no Uchū Hyōryūki)	Movie	Shin-Ei Animation			
March 6	Doraemon: Nobita's the Night Before a Wedding	ドラえもん のび太の結婚前夜 (Doraemon: Nobita no Kekkon Zenya)	Movie	Shin-Ei Animation			
March 6	The Doraemons: Funny Candy of Okashinana!?	ザ☆ドラえもんズ おかしなお菓子なオカシナナ？ (The☆Doraemons: Okashina Okashi na Okashinana?)	Movie	Shin-Ei Animation			
March 6	Doctor Slump: Arale's Surprise Burn	ドクタースランプ アラレのびっくりバーン (Dokutā Suranpu: Arare no Bikkuri Bān)	Movie	Toei Animation			
August 1	Ebichu Minds the House	おるちゅばんエビちゅ (Oruchuban Ebichu)	TV	Gainax			
October 8	Excel Saga	エクセル♥サーガ (Ekuseru Sāga)	TV	J.C.Staff	Seinen		
August 21	The File of Young Kindaichi 2: Murderous Deep Blue	金田一少年の事件簿2 殺戮のディープブルー (Kindaichi Shōnen no Jikenbo 2: Satsuriku no Deep Blue)	Movie	Toei Animation			
October 3	Guru Guru Town Hanamaru-kun	ぐるぐるタウン はなまるくん	TV	Pierrot			
April 2	Gokudo the Adventurer	ゴクドーくん漫遊記 (Gokudō-kun Man'yūki)	TV	Trans Arts			
June 30	Great Teacher Onizuka	グレート・ティーチャー・オニヅカ (Gurēto Tīchā Onizuka)	TV	Studio Pierrot			
March 20	Gundress	ガンドレス (GUNDRESS)	Movie				
October 16	Hunter × Hunter	ハンター x ハンター (Hantā x Hantā)	TV	Nippon Animation			
April 7	I'm Gonna Be An Angel!	天使になるもんっ！ (Tenshi ni Naru mon!)	TV	Studio Pierrot			
October 6	Infinite Ryvius	無限のリヴァイアス (Mugen no Rivaiasu)	TV	Sunrise			
October 6	Jubei-chan: The Ninja Girl	十兵衛ちゃん (Jūbei-chan)	TV	Madhouse			
October 11	King of Sushi	将太の寿司 心にひびくシャリの味 (Shōta no Sushi: Kokoro ni Hibiku Shari no Aji)	TV	Studio Comet			
December 23	KochiKame: The Movie	こちら葛飾区亀有公園前派出所 -The Movie- (Kochira Katsushika-ku Kameari Kōen Mae Hashutsujo: The Movie)	Movie	Studio Gallop			
January 7	Legend of Himiko	火魅子伝 (Himiko-Den)	TV	Group TAC			
July 24	Let's Go! Anpanman: When the Flower of Courage Opens	それいけ! アンパンマン 勇気の花がひらくとき (Soreike! Anpanman Yūki no Hana ga Hiraku Toki)	Movie	TMS Entertainment			
July 24	Let's Go! Anpanman: Anpanman and Their Fun Friends	それいけ!アンパンマン アンパンマンとたのしい仲間たち (Soreike! Anpanman Anpanman to Tanoshii Nakama-tachi)	Movie	TMS Entertainment			
July 30	Lupin III: The Columbus Files	ルパン三世『愛のダ・カーポ ～Fujiko's Unlucky Days』 (Rupan Sansei: Ai no Da Kāpo – Fujiko's Unlucky Days)	TV	TMS Entertainment			
July 7	Magic User's Club	魔法使いTai! (Mahō Tsukai Tai!)	TV	Madhouse, Triangle Staff			
February 7	Magical DoReMi	おジャ魔女どれみ (Ojamajo Doremi)	TV	Toei Animation			
April 2	Marco: 3000 Leagues in Search of Mother	MARCO ～母をたずねて三千里～ (Marco: Haha o Tazunete Sanzenri)	Movie	Nippon Animation			
July 2	Medabots	メダロット (Medarotto)	TV	Bee Train			
January 4	Microman: The Small Giant	小さな巨人ミクロマン (Chiisana Kyōjin Mikuroman)	TV	Pierrot			
July 31	Microman vs. Gorgon	小さな巨人 ミクロマン 大激戦！ミクロマンVS最強戦士ゴルゴン (Chiisana Kyōjin Microman: Daigekisen! Microman VS Saikyō Senshi Gorgon)	Movie	Pierrot			
April 17	Monster Rancher	モンスターファーム (Monsutā Fāmu)	TV	TMS Entertainment			
July 17	My Neighbors the Yamadas	ホーホケキョとなりの山田くん (Hōhokekyo Tonari no Yamada-kun)	Movie	Studio Ghibli			
October 14	Now and Then, Here and There	今、そこにいる僕 (Ima, Soko ni Iru Boku)	TV	AIC			
October 20	One Piece	ワンピース (Wan Pīsu)	TV	Toei Animation			
March 2	Pet Shop of Horrors	ペットショップ オブ ホラーズ (Pettoshoppu obu Horāzu)	TV	Madhouse	Shōjo, Josei		
February 13	Phantom Thief Jeanne	神風怪盗ジャンヌ (Kamikaze Kaitō Jannu)	TV	Toei Animation			
July 17	Pikachu's Rescue Adventure	ピカチュウたんけんたい (Pikachu Tankentai)	Movie	Oriental Light and Magic			
July 17	Pokémon the Movie 2000	劇場版ポケットモンスター 幻のポケモン ルギア爆誕 (Gekijōban Poketto Monsutā Maboroshi no Pokemon Rugia Bakutan)	Movie	Oriental Light and Magic			
April 3	Power Stone	パワーストーン (Pawā Sutōn)	TV	Pierrot			
July 27	Re-Birthday	ハッピーバースデー 命かがやく瞬間 (Happy Birthday: Inochi Kagayaku Toki)	Movie	Magic Bus			
September 14	Reign: The Conqueror	アレクサンダー戦記 (Arekusandā Senki)	OVA	Madhouse			
October 19	Rerere's Genius Bakabon	レレレの天才バカボン (Rerere no Tensai Bakabon)	TV	Pierrot			
August 14	Revolutionary Girl Utena: Adolescence of Utena	少女革命ウテナ アドゥレセンス黙示録 (Shōjo Kakumei Utena Aduresensu Mokushiroku)	Movie	J.C. Staff			
March 4	She and Her Cat	彼女と彼女の猫 (Kanojo to Kanojo no Neko)	OVA	Liden Films			
January 4	Space Pirate Mito	宇宙海賊ミトの大冒険 (Uchū Kaizoku Mito no Daibōken)	TV	Triangle Staff			
July 3	Soul Hunter	仙界伝 封神演義 (Senkaiden Hōshin Engi)	TV	Studio Deen			
April 4	Starship Girl Yamamoto Yohko	それゆけ!宇宙戦艦ヤマモト・ヨーコ (Soreyuke! Uchū Senkan Yamamoto Yōko)	TV	J.C.Staff, T-Up			
October 5	Steel Angel Kurumi	鋼鉄天使くるみ (Kōtetsu Tenshi Kurumi)	TV	Oriental Light and Magic			
June 25	Tenamonya Voyagers	てなもんやボイジャーズ	TV	Pierrot			
July 24	Tenchi Forever! The Movie	天地無用 IN LOVE 2! − 遙かなる想い (Tenchi Muyō in Rabu Tsū!: Haruka naru omoi)	Movie	AIC			
October 13	The Big O	THE ビッグオー (Za Biggu Ō)	TV	Sunrise			
June 17	Tokimeki Memorial	ときめきメモリアル (Tokimeki Memoriaru)	OVA	Pierrot			
April 9	Turn A Gundam	∀ガンダム (Tān Ē Gandamu)	TV	Sunrise			
April 24	You're Under Arrest: The Movie	劇場版逮捕しちゃうぞ (Gekijōban Taiho Shichauzo)	Movie	Studio Deen			
March 6	Yu-Gi-Oh!	遊☆戯☆王 (Yū☆Gi☆Ō)	Movie	Toei Animation			
February 23	Zeno – For the Infinity of Love	ゼノ かぎりなき愛に (Zeno – Kagiri Naki Ai ni)	Movie	Toei Animation			
November 30	Charm Point 1 Sister's Rondo		OVA				
September 4	Zoids	ゾイド -ZOIDS- (Zoido)	TV	Xebec			
August 25	Words Worth	ワーズ・ワース(Wordsworth)	OVA	Green Bunny Arms Corporation			

== See also ==
- 1999 in Japanese television
- 1999 in Italian television
- 1999 in Portuguese television
- 1999 in Macau
- 1999 in Spain
- 1999 in animation
- 1999 in television
