= Brian Lacey =

Brian Lacey may refer to:

- Brian Lacey (entertainment executive), founder of Lacey Entertainment
- Brian Lacey (sport shooter), competitive rifle shooter from New Zealand
- Brian Lacey (Gaelic footballer) (born 1974), Irish retired Gaelic footballer
