= Kazuo Oka =

Japanese voice actor (1948–2021)

- 岡 和男
- Born: 15 January 1948; Saitama Prefecture, Japan
- Died: 29 April 2021 (aged 73)
- Occupation: voice actor

Kazuo Oka (岡 和男, Oka Kazuo; 15 January 1948 – 29 April 2021) was a Japanese voice actor employed by the talent management firm Arts Vision.

== Anime ==
=== TV ===
- Argento Soma (xxxx) (Smith)
- Brave Police J-Decker (1994) (Kazuto Azuma)
- Dragon Drive (xxxx) (Guankū)
- Fushigiboshi no Futagohime Gyu! (xxxx) (Kureson)
- Kimi ga Nozomu Eien (xxxx) (Kenzō Sakiyama)
- Kinnikuman: Scramble for the Throne (1991-1992) (King the 100 Ton, Buffaloman (First), Robin Knight)
- Mobile Fighter G Gundam (xxxx) (Raymond Bishop)
- Naruto (xxxx) (Wagarashi 96)
- Planetes (xxxx) (Chad)
- Fist of the North Star (1984) (Gyuki)
- Transformers: The Headmasters (1987) (Getsei, Snapdragon)
- Power Stone (1999) (Kraken)
- Romeo × Juliet (2007) (The Old Man)
- March Comes in like a Lion (2016) (Shōichi Matsunaga)
- Legend of the Galactic Heroes: Die Neue These (2018) (Klaus von Lichtenlade)

=== OVA ===
- Dragonslayer Eiyū Densetsu: Ōji no Tabidachi (xxxx) (Zagī)

=== Movies ===
- The Dagger of Kamui (xxxx) (Gold Gan)

== Games ==
- Eberouge 2 (Zakusen Sōsuringu)
- Magical Drop II (Black Pierrot)
- Mega Man X4 (Storm Owl, Frost Walrus)
- Tales of the Abyss (Mayor Teodoro)

== Tokusatsu ==
- Denji Sentai Megaranger (Cicada Nejire)
- Kyuukyuu Sentai GoGo-V (Deathmine)

== Dubbing ==
- Kickboxer (Tong Po (Michel Qissi))
