= Karen Chau =

American artist

- Born: Kai-Lan Chau; United States
- Education: University of California, Irvine
- Occupation: Artist
- Years active: 2004–present
- Known for: Ni Hao, Kai-Lan

Karen Chau
- Traditional Chinese: 周凱蘭
- Simplified Chinese: 周凯兰
Transcriptions
Standard Mandarin
- Hanyu Pinyin: Zhōu Kǎilán
- IPA: [ʈʂóʊ kʰàɪ.lǎn]

Karen Kai-Lan Chau is an American artist. In 2008, she created her own TV series for Nickelodeon, Ni Hao, Kai-Lan. Ni Hao, Kai-Lan is based on the childhood memories of Chau, growing up in a bicultural (Chinese-American) household. Her childhood included several years in Plano, Texas as a student at Plano Senior High School, before her family settled in Los Angeles. The Ni Hao, Kai-Lan series was nominated for an Emmy award in spring 2010. Chau has been the director of intellectual property development for Disney since 2014.

Chau graduated with a degree in digital art from the University of California, Irvine, in 2000. She is also a painter and sculptor whose 2D and 3D work was shown for the first time in New York City in 2010.
