= List of Ni Hao, Kai-Lan episodes =

The following is an episode list for the Nick Jr. Channel animated television series Ni Hao, Kai-Lan (pronounced /naɪ ˈhaʊ kaɪ ˈlæn/).

== Series overview ==
Season	Episodes	Originally released	
Season	Episodes	First released	Last released
1	20	February 7, 2008	August 14, 2009
2	20	February 2, 2009	October 8, 2010
3	2	August 21, 2011	

== Episodes ==
=== Season 1 (2008–09) ===
No. overall	No. in season	Title	Written by	Storyboard by	Original release date
1	1	"Dragonboat Festival"	Sascha Paladino	Chris Savino and Carlos Ramos	February 7, 2008
Kai-Lan and her friends have a dragonboat race at the Dragonboat Festival, and, after the race, they meet a real dragon named "Mr. Dragon". When Rintoo and Kai-Lan come in last place at the first Dragonboat Race because Rintoo didn't listen to Ye-Ye's instructions and did not follow the peeking mice's drumbeat, he grumpily kicks the boat up onto a gazebo's roof, causing it to have some difficulty to get it back down from up there. Kai-Lan needs your help to show Rintoo what to do when you feel very mad. Words in Mandarin Chinese: 你好 nǐ hǎo - hello, 爺爺 yé yé - Grandpa, 我来了 wǒ lái le - I'm coming, 一、二、三 yī èr sān - one two three, 跳 tiáo - jump, 謝謝 xiè xiè - thank you, 再見 zài jiàn - goodbye
2	2	"Twirly Whirly Flyers"	Sascha Paladino	Andy Kelly	February 8, 2008
While playing Twirly Whirly Flyers, Tolee spins so much that he lands on the ants' bridge and breaks it by accident, so he runs away in shame. Kai-Lan and the viewer show Tolee the importance of admitting your mistakes and apologizing to the ants so they can fix the bridge. Words in Mandarin Chinese: -紅色 hóng sè - red, 綠色 lǜ sé - green, 哎呀 āi-yā - oh no
3	3	"Tolee's Rhyme Time"	Bradley Zweig	James Burks	February 11, 2008
Kai-Lan is starting a music show with all of her friends. Rintoo plays his xylophone, Hoho scratches his turntables, Kai-Lan shakes her tambourine, Mr. Sun plays the trumpet, and Lulu watches the show. Tolee decides that he wants to be a singer in the music group, but, however, he is having a lot of trouble rhyming. It's up to Kai-Lan and the viewer to help Tolee learn that if he practices, he will get better at rhyming and soon, he gets to be in the show too. Words in Mandarin Chinese: 上 shàng - up, 下 xià - down
4	4	"The Ant Playground"	Sascha Paladino	Jill Colbert	February 12, 2008
Kai-Lan and her friends are building a brand new swing for the ants' unfinished playground. But when the swing they made turns out to be too big for the ants, they need your help to figure out what to do. Words in Mandarin Chinese: 上 shàng - up, 下 xià - down, 火車 huǒ chē - train, 滑梯 huá tī - slide, 螞蟻 mǎ yǐ - Ant
5	5	"Wait, Hoho, Wait!"	Joe Purdy	Carlos Ramos and Andy Kelly	February 13, 2008
Hoho is having a hard time waiting for Rintoo's car to be finished, so he jumps in and breaks the car just before it is ready by accident. Kai-Lan needs your help to help Hoho find a way to be patient. Words in Mandarin Chinese: 推 tuī - push, 餃子 jiǎo zi - dumplings, 筷子 kuài zi - chopsticks, 汽車 qì chē - car, 四 sì - four, 五 wǔ - five
6	6	"Kai-Lan's Campout"	May Chan	Aaron Paetz	February 14, 2008
The gang is having a campout in Kai-Lan's backyard, but when Rintoo wants to play with Tolee's stuffed panda Pandy, he refuses to share him with him. Kai-Lan needs your help to remind Tolee to be a nice friend and share. Words in Mandarin Chinese: 拖鞋 tuō xié - slippers, 手電筒 shǒu diàn tǒng - flashlight, 牙刷 yá shuā - toothbrush, 毯子 tǎn zi - blanket, 袜子 wà zi - socks, 枕頭 zhěn tou - pillow, 短褲 duǎn kù - underwear, 睡袋 shuì dài - sleeping bag
7	7	"Happy Chinese New Year!"	Bradley Zweig	James Burks	February 15, 2008
While the dragon team carries the dragon to the Chinese New Year parade, Rintoo gets upset and quits because he doesn't want to be in the "boring" middle. So it's up to the viewer to help Kai-Lan teach Rintoo that his job as a team is still important. Words in Mandarin Chinese: 新年快樂 xīn nián kuài lè - Happy (Chinese) New Year, 龍 lóng - Dragon, 恭喜 gōng xǐ - Congratulations
8	8	"Everybody's Hat Parade"	Bradley Zweig	Howie Perry	March 24, 2008
Rintoo makes a very special hat for the hat parade, but when Hoho makes the same hat, Rintoo gets mad! Kai-Lan and the viewer show Rintoo that Hoho copied his hat because he liked it. Words in Mandarin Chinese: 帽子 mào zǐ - hat
9	9	"The Snowiest Ride"	Sascha Paladino	Jill Colbert	March 25, 2008
Kai-Lan and the viewer help Tolee overcome his fear of sledding by taking things little by little. First, they sled down a small hill, then a medium-sized hill, and then finally the large hill. Words in Mandarin Chinese: 雪 xué - snow, 抱抱 bào bào - hug, tiáo - jump, 哎呀 āi yā - oh no
10	10	"Safari Pals"	Bradley Zweig	Chris Savino and Akis Dimitrakopoulos	March 26, 2008
The viewer, Kai-Lan, and her friends go on a safari, but when Rintoo's other friends begin playing with Stompy the Elephant instead of him, Rintoo says that he wishes he is big like Stompy, then he can have a very big roar, he can make a very big path, and everyone can ride on his very big back. This makes Rintoo jealous of Stompy and go back home. Words in Mandarin Chinese: 推 tuī - push 大象 dà xiàng - elephant
11	11	"Rain or Shine"	Bradley Zweig	James Burks and Andy Kelly	March 27, 2008
Rintoo, Tolee and Hoho are sad because they can't play with their stuff in the rain, but Kai-Lan and the viewer teach them that there are some things you can do in the rain. Words in Mandarin Chinese: 拉 lā - pull, 青蛙 qīng wā - frog, 蝸牛 wō niú - snail, 烏龜 wū guī - turtle, 蟲子 chóng zi - worm
12	12	"Beach Day"	Susan Kim	Jill Colbert	July 11, 2008
When a wave knocks over Tolee's sandcastle three times by accident, he becomes angry and stomps on his friends' whole sandcastles. Kai-Lan needs your help to get Tolee to calm down so they can finish the sandcastle. Words in Mandarin Chinese: 貝殼 bèi ké - seashell, 挖 wā - dig, 螃蟹 páng xiè - crab, 哎呀 āi yā - oh no
13	13	"Sports Day"	Spencer Walker	Aaron J. Paetz and Andy Kelly	August 6, 2008
When Rintoo wins all the dinosaur games, he begins bragging about how great he is and it makes Tolee and Hoho feel bad, getting to the point where they decide to quit the dinosaur games. It's up to the viewer to help Kai-Lan show Rintoo that he needs to learn to say something nice when you win games. Words in Mandarin Chinese: 恐龍 kǒng lóng - dinosaur, 開始 kāishǐ - begin, 預備 yù bèi - get ready
14	14	"Kai-Lan's Carnival"	Sascha Paladino	Aaron J. Paetz and Andy Kelly	October 6, 2008
Rintoo and Hoho run away when they break Stompy's rollercoaster rocket ride by accident when they think that Stompy will be mad, with the reason being the balls at a splashing game bounced off and hit a tire, then a coconut, then a seesaw, which made a beanbag box fly into the air and land on the rocket, So Kai-Lan needs your help to teach Hoho and Rintoo that they need to say "sorry", and help fix it. Words in Mandarin Chinese: 八 bā - eight, 拉 lā - pull
15	15	"Roller Rintoo"	Sascha Paladino	Aaron J. Paetz and Andy Kelly	October 7, 2008
Rintoo wants to be good at roller-skating, but he gets more than he bargained for when he finds out that it is more difficult than he expected. Luckily, Kai-Lan and the viewer show him how to take it slow by going on two hands, then one hand, then all by yourself. Words in Mandarin Chinese: 快 kuài - fast, 溜冰鞋 liù bīng xié - roller skates, 頭盔 tóu kuī - helmet, 護膝 hù xī - knee pads, 加油 jiā yóu - a cheer
16	16	"Lulu Day"	Bradley Zweig	James Burks and Andy Kelly	October 8, 2008
Kai-Lan and Lulu have a special play date but they can't figure out what to play together because they want to play with different things. So the viewer helps them learn how to compromise. Words in Mandarin Chinese: 吹 chuī - blow, 風車 feng chē - pinwheel, 太陽 tài yáng - sun, 手镯 shǒu zhuó - bracelet, 熊貓 xióng māo - panda, 跑車 pǎo chē - race car, 茶壺 chá hú - teapot
17	17	"Hoho's Big Flight"	Adam Peltzman	Carlos Ramos and Andy Kelly	October 9, 2008
It is the night of the lantern festival, but Hoho isn't listening to Ye-Ye's instructions and instead chases leaves, sniffs apples, and sways lanterns, so he eventually loses his lantern. And what's worse is that Hoho doesn't know how to listen, either. Words in Mandarin Chinese: 聽 tīng - listen, 湯圓 tāng yuán - Tangyuan, 燈籠 dēng lóng - lantern
18	18	"Ni Hao, Halloween"	Eric Shaw	Aaron J. Paetz and Andy Kelly	October 28, 2008
Rintoo is excited to go trick or treating, but after injuring his ankle on a rock because he was walking backwards and he did not watch where he was going, he has to stay in bed with his ankle in a cast for a day and he can't go trick or treating today until next year of Halloween, much to his depression. Kai-Lan and her friends refuse to go without him, and need your help to find a way for him to go trick or treating with his friends. Words in Mandarin Chinese: 跳 tiáo - jump, 糖 táng - sugar, 孫悟空 Sūn Wùkōng - Monkey King, 哭泣 kūqì - sob
19 20	19 20	"Kai-Lan's Trip to China"	Sascha Paladino and Bradley Zweig	Andy Kelly	August 14, 2009 (Note: This episode was first released on Kai-Lan's Great Trip to China DVD on July 14, 2009.)
Kai-Lan and her friends visit China to visit her great aunt and see the naming of a baby panda. Rintoo, Hoho and Tolee get scared to try something new in China, and soon the baby panda is scared to ride a boat for the first time as well. He is eventually calmed down by the viewer, Kai-Lan, and her friends, and overcomes his fear. Words in Mandarin Chinese: 姑奶奶 gū nǎi nai - great aunt, 姑我叫 Wǒ jiào - My name is..., 西瓜 xī guā - watermelon, 小 xīao - little, 開心 kāi xīn - happy, 姐姐 jiě jie - big sister, 妹妹 mèi mei - little sister, 哥哥 gē ge - big brother

=== Season 2 (2009–10) ===
No. overall	No. in season	Title	Written by	Storyboard by	Original release date
21	1	"The Ladybug Festival"	Chris Nee	Ryan Kramer and Michael Mullen	February 2, 2009
The gang hits a fork on their way to the ladybug festival when Rintoo and Hoho loudly chatter so much Tolee gets mad, because they are not listening to Tolee. Kai-Lan needs your help to get them to listen because Tolee has something important to say and he knows the right path to the festival. Words in Chinese: 小鳥 xiǎo niǎo - bird
22	2	"The Dinosaur Balloon"	Sascha Paladino	Adam Henry and Andy Kelly	May 11, 2009
Kai-Lan breaks her own dinosaur balloon by accident, the reason being she was singing and dancing about how much she loved dinosaurs. Stompy, the only one capable of fixing the balloon; doesn't bother to help her out because he says it wasn't his fault that the balloon broke. Now, it's up to Rintoo and the viewer to convince Stompy that helping others is part of being a good friend. Words in Chinese: 手臂 gē bo - arm, 牙齒 yá chǐ - teeth, 眼睛 yǎn jing - eyes
23	3	"Kai-Lan's Big Play"	Chris Nee	Adam Henry and Andy Kelly	May 12, 2009
Kai-Lan and her friends are putting on an educational play based on the Chinese folktale about the Monkey King. When Rintoo steals the part that Hoho wanted, Hoho gets frustrated and quits the play and it's up to the viewer to help Kai-Lan figure out what to do and ask Hoho to tell Rintoo why he's frustrated so he can feel better. Words in Chinese: 跳 tiào - jump
24	4	"Playtime at Tolee's"	Mark Palmer	Ryan Kramer and Michael Mullen	May 13, 2009
Tolee invites Kai-Lan, Rintoo and Hoho for a playdate at his boathouse for the day, but when Rintoo rips Tolee's new panda painting by accident, Tolee gets upset and does not forgive Rintoo, since Tolee forgave Rintoo for the last two mistakes he made, which makes him feel bad. Kai-Lan and the viewer teach Tolee that forgiving others is part of being a good friend. Words in Chinese: 蘋果 píng guǒ - apple
25	5	"The Moon Festival"	Chris Nee	Adam Henry, Andy Kelly, and Ryan Kramer	May 14, 2009
Hoho is thrilled because he's finally old enough to stay awake for the Chinese moon festival. He gets disappointed when he can't see the moon in the cloudy sky, and needs help from Kai-Lan and the viewer to make everything better. Words in Chinese: 月餅 yuè bǐng - moon cake
26	6	"Kai-Lan's Big Surprise"	Sascha Paladino	Andy Kelly and Jae-Woo Kim	May 15, 2009
Kai-Lan wants to have a thank you party for Ye-Ye, but when a big gust of wind ruins everything that Kai-Lan and her friends had set up for the party (the decorations, the "I Love You" card, and the pineapple cake). This causes Kai-Lan to start crying. Now, it's up to the viewer at home to help Rintoo, Tolee, and Hoho make Kai-Lan happy again, and fix the party before Ye-Ye comes back from apple picking. Words in Chinese: 我愛 wǒ ài - I love
27	7	"Rintoo Makes a Splash"	Corey Powell	Andy Kelly and Jae-Woo Kim	October 13, 2009
The gang is having a lot of fun at a water park, but Rintoo begins playing too rough and it is upsetting Tolee and Hoho, getting to the point where they tell Rintoo that they don't want to play with him anymore. Kai-Lan and the viewer teach Rintoo to play more gently so everyone can play and have fun. Words in Chinese: 水 shuǐ - water
28	8	"The Ants Dance"	Sascha Paladino	Ryan Kramer and Michael Mullen	October 14, 2009
Bubu, Fufu and two unnamed ants get ready for a dance show with Kai-Lan's band, but the show is almost ruined when Bubu gets bossy and makes all the choices. So Bubu learns from Kai-Lan and the viewer that if his friends have a choice, everyone will feel happy and they can have a splendid time. Words in Chinese: 跳舞 tiào wǔ - Dance
29	9	"Stompy Rides Again"	Calvin Leung	Ryan Kramer and Michael Mullen	October 15, 2009
Kai-Lan and her friends are riding a train to Hula Duck Island, but Stompy the Elephant shows up unexpectedly and he wants to join in, too. However, he finds out he can't ride the train because there are no more empty seats, meaning he can't play with his friends. The viewer, Kai-Lan, and her friends have to find a way for everyone, including Stompy, to play. Words in Chinese: 藍色 lán sè - blue, 橙色 chéng sè - orange
30	10	"Rintoo's Big Flip"	Chris Nee	Adam Henry and Andy Kelly	October 16, 2009
Kai-Lan and her pals get to take part in a show with some Chinese rabbit acrobats. However, Rintoo does not practice his flips, and when he tries flipping, he falls instead. As a result, he gives up with tears and quits the show. Now it's up to Kai-Lan and the viewer to teach Rintoo a lesson in perseverance. Words in Chinese: 圓形 yuán xíng - Circle
31	11	"Kai-Lan's Snowcoaster"	Chris Nee and P. Kevin Strader	Adam Henry and Andy Kelly	February 19, 2010
It is a snowy day, and Kai-Lan and her friends are building a snowcoaster that they can all ride! Everyone has a job to do, but an overprotective Rintoo keeps taking little Hoho's jobs, which makes him sad because he wants to help out. Kai-Lan and the viewer need to help Rintoo see that even though Hoho is small, he still likes to help. Words in Chinese: 推 tuī - push
32	12	"Tolee's Turn"	Chris Nee	Andy Kelly and Jae-Woo Kim	February 26, 2010
Kai-Lan and her friends go sailing and play hide and seek along with the dolphins. Rintoo loves driving too much and does not give Tolee a turn, so Tolee stops the boat with its anchor and jumps on a raft and gets mad at Rintoo. Kai-Lan and the viewer need to show Rintoo the importance of taking turns so everyone can play and fast, so they can find the last dolphin. Words in Chinese: 海豚 hǎi tún - dolphin
33	13	"Lulu's Cloud"	Chris Nee and P. Kevin Strader	Adam Henry and Andy Kelly	March 22, 2010
Kai-Lan and her friends are invited to play at Lulu's house. But Hoho is feeling uncomfortable because things are different. It's up to the viewer to help Kai-Lan show Hoho there is nothing to be afraid of when trying different things. Words in Chinese: 氣球 qì qiú - balloon
34	14	"Kai-Lan's Playhouse"	Sascha Paladino	Adam Henry, Andy Kelly, and Michael Mullen	March 23, 2010
Hoho has a hard time finding all the supplies he needs to decorate his wall in the clubhouse Ye-Ye and the ants have built for Kai-Lan and all her friends, getting to the point where he ends up hitting Rintoo in the leg after he takes the last banana sticker he wanted. Hoho is put in time-out by Ye-Ye for hitting Rintoo, and it's now up to the viewers at home to help Kai-Lan show Hoho that there is a better way to express his feelings and apologize to Rintoo. Words in Chinese: 恐龍 kǒng lóng - dinosaur
35	15	"Pandy's Puddle"	Chris Nee	Adam Henry and Andy Kelly	March 24, 2010
Today, there's going to be a special garden celebration, and Kai-Lan and her friends are gathering their best vegetables. But when Tolee's beloved stuffed panda, Pandy, falls in the mud by accident, Ye-Ye takes him away to clean him, which makes Tolee very sad. It is now up to Kai-Lan and the viewers at home to help Tolee feel better so he can enjoy the special garden celebration. Words in Chinese: 胡蘿蔔 hú luó bo - carrot
36	16	"Tolee's Promise"	Bradley Zweig; Story by: Sascha Paladino	Sharon Forward, Andy Kelly, and Michael Mullen	March 25, 2010
When the snails' merry-go-round breaks because it went over a rock and crashed at the bottom of a hill. Kai-Lan and her friends agree to build a new merry-go-round for the baby snails. When Tolee promises to help, he runs off to go see the ants' scooter race. The viewers at home help Kai-Lan show Tolee that he should be a good friend and keep his promise. Words in Chinese: 轉 zhuàn - spin
37	17	"The Place Where We All Live"	Sascha Paladino	Ryan Kramer and Michael Mullen	April 22, 2010 (Note: This episode was first released in Go Green! DVD on March 30, 2010.)
The ants, snails and worms are busy building a new fruit stand in Ant City. When Ye-Ye gives Kai-Lan and her friends kites for a present, they forget about the wrapping paper, eventually causing problems for the ants, snails and worms when their trash gets everywhere. Kai-Lan and her friends need your help to help take care of the place where they all live before the insects find out. Words in Chinese: 風箏 fēng zheng - kite, 拉 lā - pull
38	18	"The Hula Duck Dance Party"	Calvin Leung	Ryan Kramer and Michael Mullen	May 28, 2010
The Hula Ducks are having a dance party on the beach, and Kai-Lan and her friends are invited. While playing musical chairs, Tolee has to sit out every time because he loses when he does not pay attention to when the music stops and still dances rather than acting fast to find a chair. Kai-Lan needs your help to find a way for Tolee to play so he will not be left out. Words in Chinese: 跳舞 tiào wǔ - Dance
39 40	19 20	"Princess Kai-Lan"	Sascha Paladino and Chris Nee	James Burks, Andy Kelly, and Michael Mullen	October 8, 2010 (Note: This episode was first released on Princess Kai-Lan DVD on October 5, 2010.)
Part 1: When the Monkey King visits Kai-Lan and her friends, he asks for their help in a magical land inhabited by foxes and bears. The foxes and the bears do not talk to each other because they are not friends. Therefore, Kai-Lan and her friends travel to the lands of the Fox Kingdom and the Bear Kingdom to help the foxes and bears learn to communicate. This journey may prove to be Kai-Lan's greatest challenge yet. Along the way, they discover what makes the foxes and bears angry. Part 2: Kai-Lan and the viewer encourage the Fox King and Bear Queen to discuss their grievances, allowing their friends to assist them. Finally, Kai-Lan suggests a rule: the foxes and bears should sing and dance together once a day. They agree to this rule and, as a result, become friends. The two kingdoms unite to form "The Kingdom of Friends." The Monkey King makes Kai-Lan the princess of this kingdom, while Kai-Lan appoints her friends as the knights of the Kingdom of Friends. They conclude the episode with singing and dancing, and Kai-Lan reveals that the viewer is also a part of the Kingdom of Friends. Words in Chinese: 跳 tiào - jump, 朋友 péng yǒu - friend, 吹 chuī - blow, 狐王 hú wáng - Fox King, 熊后 xióng hòu - Bear Queen, 公主 gōng zhǔ - Princess; Note: There is no "Let's Find Out Why" in this episode as the Monkey King states the happening and reason.

=== Season 3 (2011) ===
No. overall	No. in season	Title	Written by	Storyboard by	Original release date
41 42	1 2	"Journey to Monkey King Castle"	Sascha Paladino and Chris Nee	Adam Henry, Andy Kelly, Ryan Kramer, and Michael Mullen	August 21, 2011 (Nick Jr.)
Part 1: The Monkey King is having a party in his castle and the viewer, Kai-Lan, and her friends help him decorate. However as the preparations begin, the gang tries out some of his things, causing a big mess. So Kai-Lan and her friends apologize to the Monkey King for causing the mess, and the Monkey King says it was an accident. Part 2: Finally, Kai-Lan and her friends point out that their clothes are dirty; The Monkey King switches the dirty clothes with Monkey King costumes, they finish decorating, and Kai-Lan receives the "very newest" Monkey King book from the Monkey King. Words in Chinese: 孫悟空 Sūn Wùkōng - Monkey King, 雲 yún - cloud, 城堡 chéng bǎo - castle
