= Power Stone (TV series) =

Television anime

- Power Stone as released by ADV Films, Volume 1

パワーストーン (Pawā Sutōn)
- Genre: Adventure, Science fiction
- Anime television series
- Directed by: Takahiro Omori
- Produced by: Kaori Sakamoto (TBS); Reiko Fukakusa (Studio Pierrot)
- Written by: Sukehiro Tomita
- Music by: Keisuke Kikuchi; Christian Montalbano (US version)
- Studio: Studio Pierrot
- Licensed by: NA: Lacey Entertainment
- Original network: TBS
- English network: CA: YTV; SEA: AXN-Asia
- Original run: April 3, 1999 – September 25, 1999
- Episodes: 26

Power Stone (パワーストーン, Pawā Sutōn) is a Japanese children's anime television series produced by Studio Pierrot and directed by Kenichiro Watanabe and Takahiro Omori. It is based on the Capcom video game series of the same name.

== Plot ==
The story takes place during the 19th century; Edward Falcon (Édouard Fokker) finds himself on a quest to find the magical power stones and his father, in order to save the world.

== Cast ==
Character	Japanese voice actor	English voice actor
Edward Falcon/Édouard Fokker	Masaya Onosaka	Robert Tinkler
Ryoma	Mitsuo Iwata	Edward Glen
Rouge	Ryoko Nagata	Stacey DePass
Ayame Yumatara	Tomoko Kawakami	Stephanie Morgenstern
Apollus	Kenichi Ogata	Bill Colgate
Valgas/Vargas	Akio Otsuka	Tony Daniels
Kraken	Kazuo Oka	George Buza
Gunrock	Kiyoyuki Yanada	Richard Clarkin
Galuda	Masafumi Kimura	Denis Akiyama
Wang-Tang	Megumi Ogata	Peter Oldring
Jack Winslow	Wataru Takagi	Julie Lemieux
Pride Falcon/Pride Fokker	Jūrōta Kosugi	Maurice Dean Wint
Kikunojo	Naoki Tatsuta	Damon D'Oliveira
Octo	Tōru Ōkawa	Robert Smith
Pus	Tomohiro Nishimura	Edward Glen

== Episode list ==
Power Stone aired on TBS in Japan from April 3 to September 25, 1999, for 26 episodes. Bandai Visual released the series on DVD, LaserDisc and VHS across seven volumes between September 25, 1999, and March 25, 2000.

It was later licensed for distribution in North America by Lacey Entertainment who produced an English-language dub with Kaleidoscope Entertainment. ADV Films acquired home video rights, releasing the series across six DVDs between October 31, 2001, and July 2, 2002. The series premiered on AXN Asia in September 2000. This was followed by a Singapore-specific broadcast through Kids Central starting that December. In Canada, the series debuted on YTV between May 5, 2002, and October 18, 2003. It was broadcast in Brazil by Globo; however, its age rating being reclassified there over concerns about violent content and the character of Kikunojo (Ayame's cross-dressing brother, an original character to the series) led to the series being hastily edited, with episode 12 being skipped.

TBS licenses the show for overseas airing/broadcast or retail.

No.	Title	Original release date
1	"Power Stone of Mystery" (Note: English titles come from ADV's volume DVD releases from 2001 to 2002.) "The Power Stone Mystery" (Action! Mystery of the Secret Stone (活劇!秘石の謎, Katsugeki! Hi ishi no nazo))	April 3, 1999
Young prize fighter and heir Edward Falcon receives a mysterious stone from his disappeared father. Upon undergoing a startling transformation while fending off pirates who want the stone, Falcon decides to learn more about it. Introducing characters: Edward Falcon, Apollus, Pride Falcon, Rouge, Octo & Pus, Ayame, Ryoma
2	"Shadow Warrior" (Note: English titles come from ADV's volume DVD releases from 2001 to 2002.) "Shadow Warriors" (The Wind-Slicing Shadow Troops (風を斬る影の軍団, Kaze o kiru kage no gundan))	April 10, 1999
Still trying to understand the abilities the mysterious stone grants him, Falcon sees himself hounded by a band of ninjas who want to take it from him.
3	"Samurai Spirit" (Burning Samurai Spirit (燃えるサムライ魂, Moeru samurai tamashii))	April 17, 1999
Ryoma, a wandering samurai who issued a challenge to Falcon earlier, seeks him out to have a rematch after Falcon had not shown up due to forgetting about it. As they duel, Ryoma reveals that he also possesses a Power Stone and the ability to transform with it.
4	"The Ghost Ship" (The Ghost Ship That Calls Fear (恐怖を呼ぶ幽霊船, Kyōfu o yobu yūreisen))	April 24, 1999
An opera date between Falcon and Ayame (who went in Rouge's place in order to steal his Power Stone) is crashed by a strange bandaged man, who is going around the city stealing precious stones for his "Mother". Introducing characters: Jack
5	"Girl Trouble" (The Girl Is Scary... (女の子は怖いぞ～, Onnanoko wa kowai zo~))	May 1, 1999
Falcon's mother attempts to set him up with a sweet girl named Cassie. But there may be more to her than it seems. Introducing characters: Valgas (in person)
6	"Another Power Stone" (Another Devil's Stone (もうひとつの魔石, Mō hitotsu no maseki))	May 8, 1999
Falcon receives another package with a new Power Stone and a clue on the whereabouts of his father. He departs for Wood Land, where he meets the recipient of this new Power Stone, cook and martial artist Wang-Tang, with whom he hopes to learn to better control his Power Change. Introducing characters: Wang-Tang
7	"The Great Eagle's Nest" "The Great Eagle's Egg" (Wild Training at Mount Minmin (眠眠山の荒修行, Minmin yama no kōshugyō))	May 15, 1999
Wang-Tang's master tasks his pupil, along with Falcon and Ryoma, with climbing a dangerous mountain and retrieving an egg from an eagle's nest in order to master the secrets of their Power Stones.
8	"The Pirate Kraken" (A Fierce Enemy! Kraken (強敵!クラーケン, Kyōteki! Kurāken))	May 22, 1999
News of sailors being attacked by giant octopus tentacles off the coast of Wood Land reach the heroes, so Falcon and Wang-Tang decide to investigate. Wang-Tang's cooperativeness and survival skills annoy Falcon, who thinks he wants to take charge, but his stubbornness leads him to be captured by the person behind the attacks: the leader of the Octopus Gang of pirates, Kraken. Introducing characters: Kraken
9	"The Black Crystal" (The Black Crystal's Ambition (黒水晶の野望, Kurosuishō no yabō))	May 29, 1999
Rouge has a premonitory dream with a red moon and sets off to her homeland, Fire Land, where Falcon is also headed, following another clue to his father's whereabouts. There, she confronts Neros, the Oracle of the land who came into power after predicting a disaster that Rouge's mentor failed to foresee, and now lives in opulence while the people are in squalor. Unbeknownst to the people, Neros is a sham who cooperates with the Octopus Gang to set up the disasters he "predicts", and thus keep his position of power. Learning of this, Rouge challenges him for his position by setting her prediction for Fire Land against his.
10	"Red Moon" (The Red Moon Seen in a Dream (夢で見た赤い月, Yume de mita akai gatsu))	June 5, 1999
With the public's support, Neros requests them to make massive offerings in gold and precious stones to placate the nearby volcano's fury to prevent his "prophecy" from coming to pass, effectively covering himself. However, Falcon exposes him after investigating the true source of the manufactured disasters: massive amounts of dynamite provided by Kraken's pirates, while Ryoma is taken prisoner in a failed attempt to save Rouge from Neros' grasp. A massive explosion burns down the palace, but Rouge's own Power Stone, concealed in her crystal ball, awakens, allowing her to save Ryoma, and her prophecy to come to pass.
11	"Gold Rush" (Gold Rush! (ゴールドラッシュ!, Gorudorasshu!))	June 12, 1999
Traveling to Gold Land in search of another lead on his father, Falcon gets quickly taken in by the gambling scene, striking a friendship with Gunrock, a man with an uncanny lucky streak thanks to a Power Stone in his possession. However, things take a dark turn when Gunrock confesses he sent Pride to his doom. Introducing characters: Gunrock
12	"Escape from Mystery Mountain" (The Great Escape from Devil's Mountain (魔の山の大脱出, Ma no yama no dai dasshutsu))	June 19, 1999
Gunrock elaborates on Pride's fate: in Gold Land, the casino games are rigged so that gamblers win big before losing everything they have; when that happens, many are forced to work on the gold mines under subhuman conditions to pay off their debt. Falcon and Gunrock hatch a plan to sneak into the mine in order to investigate and possibly find Pride.
13	"The Assistant" (Now, a Helper! (いざ!助太刀ぜよ!, Iza! Sukedachi zeyo!))	June 26, 1999
Falcon's next destination is Moon Land, Ryoma and Ayame's homeland. Ryoma decides to visit his master so he can evaluate the progress of his training, but finds he has been challenged by a trio of troublemaking brothers, so he and Falcon decide to offer their help.
14	"Turmoil in O-Edo" "The Great Thirst" (Great Uproar in Oedo! (大江戸は大騒ぎ!, Ōedo wa ōsawagi!))	July 3, 1999
The capital city of Moon Land, Oedo, is under a great heat wave which is causing a terrible drought. The shogun's advisor, aided by Octo and Pus, disguised as foreign scientists, convinces him to build a tower which will convert sea water into fresh water, but only precious stones are to be used under the pretense that it is to be the city's centerpiece. The ruse is quickly revealed, but the shogun is made to take the fall for it, and it is up to Ayame and her family of ninjas to save the day with Falcon's help.
15	"Ninja Rain" (The Ninja Girl who Summons the Rain (雨を呼ぶ女忍者, Ame o yobu onna ninja))	July 10, 1999
It is revealed that Kraken, with his Power Stone, is the one behind the heat wave over Oedo. Impatient with his underlings' failures, he makes the sunlight harsher to punish the city and publicly announces his intention to take it over. Ayame and her family attempt to steal Kraken's Power Stone to stop him, but she ends up captured and cast out into the sea to her death. Falcon and Ryoma fight him to avenge her, and during the battle, Kraken loses the Power Stone, which finds its way to Ayame, who uses her new power to summon rain clouds and end the drought.
16	"Jack's Secret" (Jack's Secret (ジャックの秘密, Jakku no himitsu))	July 17, 1999
As thanks for saving Oedo, the shogun of Moon Land gifts Ayame with three tickets for a luxury liner headed to Soil Land. She takes Falcon and Rouge with her, with Apollus and Ryoma stowing away in the cargo hold. When the ship runs aground on an ice floe in the ocean, Falcon finds, trapped in an iceberg, the ghost ship which was home to the bandaged man that he confronted earlier back home. Sure enough, the mysterious thief strikes, stealing his Power Stone, and takes an interest in Rouge, seeing his mother in her. With the ship captain's help, Falcon and the girls learn about the bandaged man's past as Jack, the last surviving member of the prestigious Winslow family from Sun Land, of which Falcon's Power Stone is an old heirloom.
17	"A Distant Land" "The Distant Sacred Land" (Distant Sacred Land (遥かなる聖地, Harukanaru seichi))	July 24, 1999
Arriving at Soil Land, the party heads to Soil Town, but are attacked on the way by the Native Soaring Eagles tribe, who kidnap Ayame and Rouge. While Falcon and Ryoma set off to search for them after reaching Soil Town, the girls, taken to the Soaring Eagles' village, learn of their plight: the place where Soil Town is now used to be their sacred land, but they were violently driven out by settlers and forced to relocate, leaving behind only their holy totem, around which the town was built after one of the settlers was allegedly cursed trying to bring it down. Plus, without the totem's protection, the chief's daughter has fallen ill, leading Galuda, the Soaring Eagles' strongest warrior, to set out to retake their ancestral territory, by force if necessary. Introducing characters: Galuda
18	"Run Toward Tomorrow" (Run for Tomorrow! (明日に向かって走れ!, Ashita ni mukatte hashire!))	July 31, 1999
As soon as Rouge and Ayame make it back to Soil Town, Ayame is arrested by the sheriff; Rouge escapes, but her Power Stone is stolen as well as Ayame's. The sheriff of Soil Town turns out to be a corrupt man, in league with the Octopus Gang to extort the townspeople in secret, by manipulating them into believing the Soaring Eagles are a band of violent savages who routinely raid the town for their gold. After a staged attack on the town's bank, Falcon and Ryoma find the Eagles' village, and there they learn the truth from Rouge, leading Falcon and Galuda to join forces in driving the pirates out of Soil Town, rescuing Ayame and mending the fences between the Natives and the settlers.
19	"Danger Cruise" (Moment of Crisis in a Luxury Cruise (豪華客船危機一髪, Gōkakyakusen kiki ippatsu))	August 7, 1999
The heroes, now joined by Galuda, board a cruise ship to Aqua Land, where Kraken has fled to after receiving Ayame's Power Stone from the sheriff of Soil Town. Unknown to them, Octo and Pus hijack the ship, steering it toward a storm and causing it to capsize so they can loot it of all its gold. Now the heroes must find their way out before the ship sinks.
20	"Get Kraken!" (Defeat Kraken! (倒せ!クラーケン, Taose! Kurāken))	August 14, 1999
The heroes finally arrive in Aqua Land for the decisive battle against Kraken at his stronghold, Fort Skull.
21	"Valgas' Promise" (Valgas' Promise (ヴァルガスの約束, Varugasu no yakusoku))	August 21, 1999
Following Kraken's defeat and the liberation of Aqua Land, Falcon learns that his idol, world-famous professional fighter Valgas, will be having a bout there, but is incensed at seeing a newspaper article besmirching him. That night, at the arena, Falcon in unexpectedly selected to fight in one of the preliminary matches, arranged by Valgas himself. Falcon is defeated, but Valgas tells him backstage that defeat was a stepping stone for his current success, and that he chose Falcon because he saw greatness in him, while extending him an offer to join his entourage. In the interim, Rouge is attacked during a night stroll with Ryoma by a two-headed beast which steals her Power Stone. Remembering that his opponent at the arena had earlier attacked the journalist who wrote about Valgas in the newspaper, Falcon and his friends seek him out, finding out that he has a strange stone embedded in his neck that causes him to transform into the beast. By using their Power Change forms, Falcon, Ryoma and Ayame are able to defeat the beast, causing the man to turn back to normal and the stone to come off his body, appearing to bring him back to his senses; mysteriously, the last thing he remembers is accepting an offer to join Valgas. Before he can elaborate further, Falcon receives a note signed by his father urging him to return home.
22	"Crisis in the House of Falcon" (Emergency at the Fokker House (フォッカー家の一大事, Fokkā-ie no ichidaiji))	August 28, 1999
As Falcon returns to meet his father again, he tells him of the legend behind the Power Stones: there were seven, who used to be gathered together in ancient times, but they were scattered all over the world, and ever since he heard of the legend, Pride has been working to collect them, as the seven Power Stones gathered can make any wish come true, so if they are to be used for evil, disaster would befall the world. Meanwhile, Ryoma also has his Power Stone stolen as soon as he, along with Rouge and Ayame, sets foot on Sun Land; the thief later bursts into the Falcon Manor in an attempt to steal Falcon's Power Stone as well, and the same things that happened with the man who stole Rouge's Power Stone happen again: he turns into a monster and, once defeated (with an unexpected assistance from Apollus), has no memory of what happened once a crystal leaves its body and vanishes into thin air. From this, Falcon concludes that someone is hunting down Power Stone users, and decides to travel to Wood Land to warn Wang-Tang.
23	"In Pursuit of the Power Stone" "Pursuit of the Power Stones" (Chase the Meteorite (隕石を追って, Inseki o otte))	September 4, 1999
At Wood Land, the heroes search for Wang-Tang, who is making deliveries as part of his training; however, he is attacked and has his Power Stone stolen when he is tricked into guiding a lost child. Getting up to speed with the situation, Wang-Tang joins them as they depart for Gold Land to get to Gunrock, who has a date with his children's kindergarten teacher at one of Valgas' exhibition events. After the date goes awry, Gunrock is attacked by a creature made of gold demanding his Power Stone, but is unsuccessful due to the others having safeguarded it. Once defeated, the creature turns back into a human - a fighter from Valgas' entourage who had acted hostile to Wang-Tang earlier - and, again, remembers nothing. The heroes' next stop is Soil Land to get Galuda's help, with Falcon's former arranged girlfriend Cassie, now employed by the Falcon family, staying behind to take care of Gunrock's children so he can travel with the heroes. All the while, coincidentally, Valgas' wrestling tour is stopping at all the places they go to.
24	"United We Stand" (Assemble! Heroes (集え!勇者たち, Tsudoe! Yūsha-tachi))	September 11, 1999
Falcon becomes angered when Wang-Tang voices his suspicions that Valgas might be the one behind the theft of the stones, as he refuses to believe his hero could be involved. Galuda comes to meet them as soon as they arrive at Soil Land, informing that a giant scorpion attacked him out in the desert and tried to take his Power Stone. Learning that Valgas will be fighting later that night, Falcon scores tickets for himself and some of his friends, and they witness as Valgas' opponent is clearly outclassed and terrified, but Falcon also gets to see his idol savagely beat his opponent to a pulp. Afterwards, he is lured to a trap by the Octopus Brothers, who reveal they are now working for Valgas, and dare Falcon to chase him to the Dark Land. Blinded by his worship, Falcon abandons his friends to go after Valgas, causing the others to go their separate ways, while Apollus frets about whether or not he should tell Falcon that his father has already left for the Dark Land. In the desert, Falcon and Galuda are again attacked by the giant scorpion who, once defeated, is revealed to be the fighter Valgas had pummeled earlier. The next morning, Falcon decides to take the Octopus Brothers' abandoned ship and fix it so he can sail to the Dark Land and figure out the truth, with all his teammates deciding to join him again in this endeavor.
25	"Battle Field" (Battlefield (戦いの地, Tatakai no chi))	September 18, 1999
Braving through storms, with their bonds of friendship renewed, the heroes reach the Dark Land, unaware that Valgas is tracking their progress. Unexpectedly, Jack shows up and steals Falcon's Power Stone after a brief tussle, but Falcon allows him to take it, deciding to use his own power to settle matters and knowing how much the stone matters to Jack. Once they reach Valgas' stronghold, Valgas finally shows Falcon his true colors as he reveals his intentions: to gather all the Power Stones and create a world where the strong will rule over the weak. Seeing his father captured and realizing the man he admired all his life being such a merciless man, Falcon comes to his senses and fights back, only to be brutally beaten.
26	"Destiny Hill" "Hill of Destiny" (Promise Hill (約束の丘, Yakusoku no oka))	September 25, 1999
The heroes head to Valgas' inner sanctum to retrieve the stolen Power Stones and save Pride. As Valgas takes on Falcon one-on-one, he reveals he can Power Change with a unique Dark Stone, which responded to him when he was a weak, constantly bullied child, who wished for absolute power to crush even the world itself. As the others, having recovered their Power Stones, attack Valgas, he decides to bring the full potential of the Dark Stone to bear, becoming a gigantic abomination too powerful for even their Power Change forms combined. It isn't until Jack intervenes, returning his Power Stone to Falcon, that the tide of the battle turns, as all seven Power Stones, reunited, combine their power into the Light Stone, which give Falcon access to a new, mightier Power Change, with which he is able to reach Valgas' heart, destroying the Dark Stone and vanquishing him. With the Light Stone and the Power Stones back into place, darkness is dispelled from the Dark Land and the stones are scattered into the winds again, as the heroes return to their normal lives, with Falcon having decided to travel wherever his heart takes him - with Apollus always in tow.
