= Animation Masters Summit =

- Status: Active
- Genre: Animation
- Venue: Trivandrum
- Country: India
- Inaugurated: 1999; 27 years ago
- Most recent: 2018
- Attendance: 500 (2018)
- Organizer: Toonz Animation
- Filing status: Paipl
- Website: http://animationsummit.in/

The Animation Masters Summit (AMS) is an animation industry conference organized every year by Toonz Animation in India. The event brings together animation experts worldwide to discuss trends in the animation industry.

The event venue is in Trivandrum, the capital city of Kerala in India. The speakers, known as the 'masters' of the event, share their expertise and experiences with animation professionals. The event happens during April or May every year, having been going on since 1999. The event is a cross-section of mastery in animation, visual effects, and the media industry.

The summit also includes ‘Flying Elephant Competition’ which is an animation and short film competition constituted to recognize upcoming talents in the film industry. The awards are given away in Animation Short Films, Animation TV Feature & Series, Live Action Short Films, and Short Film-Student categories.
