= Ni Hao, Kai-Lan =

American animated children's television series

- Genre: Animated series Fantasy; Comedy
- Created by: Karen Chau
- Developed by: Harringtoons Productions: Mary Harrington; Nickelodeon: Karen Chau; Judy Rothman; Sascha Paladino
- Written by: Sascha Paladino (head writer); Bradley Zweig (staff writer)
- Directed by: David Marshall
- Voices of: Jade-Lianna Peters; Clem Cheung; Ben Wang; Jack Samson; Khamani Griffin; Angie Wu; Beverly Duan; Terence Hardy; Hsiang Lo
- Theme music composer: Matt Mahaffey; Sascha Paladino
- Opening theme: "Ni Hao, Kai Lan"
- Composer: Doug Califano
- Country of origin: United States
- Original languages: English; Mandarin
- No. of seasons: 3
- No. of episodes: 42 (list of episodes)

Production
- Executive producer: Mary Harrington
- Producer: Sascha Paladino
- Running time: 23–24 minutes
- Production companies: Harringtoons Productions; Nickelodeon Animation Studio (Note: Credited as Nick Jr. Productions (season 1) and Nickelodeon Productions (season 2–3). Animation outsourced to Wang Film Productions, Hong Guang Animation and Saerom Animation.)

Original release
- Network: Nickelodeon (2008-10); Nick Jr. (2011) (Note: "Journey to Monkey King Castle")
- Release: February 7, 2008 – August 21, 2011

Ni Hao, Kai-Lan is an American animated children's television series created by Karen Chau for Nickelodeon. It began as a series of three interstitial shorts on Nick Jr. called Downward Doghouse. The first full episode was initially set to premiere on October 22, 2007 on Nickelodeon's Nick Jr. block in the United States, but was delayed to February 7, 2008, to coincide with Chinese New Year.

Ni Hao, Kai-Lan is based on the childhood of series creator Karen Chau, who grew up in a bicultural Chinese-American household. "Ni hao" (你好 nǐ hǎo) means "Hello" in Mandarin, and Kai-Lan (凯兰 kǎi lán) is the Chinese name Chau was given at birth, which was later anglicized to Karen.

The first two seasons had 20 episodes each. The third season consisted of a two-part series finale. Sascha Paladino was the head writer and developer for the show.

The series was on Paramount+ (at the time CBS All Access) starting on January 19, 2021, until it was removed on December 22, 2024, due to licensing contracts.

== Premise ==
The series follows the adventures of Kai-Lan, a 6-year-old Chinese-American girl and her group of talking anthropomorphic animal companions, Rintoo, a yellow 5-year-old Bengal tiger; Tolee, a gray 5-year-old koala; Lulu, a light pink 6-year-old rhinoceros; and Hoho, a white 3-year-old monkey. In the season 1 finale, it is revealed that they all live in California. Each episode is based around a series of events during Kai-Lan's day, along with obstacles that she and her friends are forced to overcome (with "assistance" from the viewing audience) relating to riddles, playing games, and working together. Common rituals may involve Kai-Lan resolving conflicts with her friends when they feel negative emotions. To help them, Kai-Lan has the audience help her figure out why they are having difficult situations. Usually, once Kai-Lan's friends discover their actions are wrong, they usually apologize and promise to work together better. The audience is generally presented with two musical sing-alongs where Kai-Lan sings about what must be done to overcome her and her friends' challenges. The episode always ends with Kai-Lan successfully helping her friends and everyone gets along. At the end of all episodes, Kai-Lan thanks the viewer for helping her and adds, "You're a really great friend. You make my heart feel super happy!" and then says goodbye. In season 2, she says this phrase in Mandarin Chinese as well.

Other aspects generally featured in episodes are 11 minutes of interactivity, a target word that is repeated multiple times, a few words of Mandarin Chinese vocabulary, and Kai-Lan saying, "You make my heart feel super happy" at the end of each episode, before saying goodbye. Later installments added Kai-lan saying this phrase in Mandarin after she said it in English: 你讓我好開心 (nǐ ràng wǒ hǎo kāi xīn). Ni Hao, Kai-Lan introduces its viewers to the Mandarin Chinese language, along with elements of Chinese culture and values, and intergenerational families (e.g., Kai-Lan and her relationship with Ye-Ye).

== Episodes ==
Season	Episodes	Originally released	
Season	Episodes	First released	Last released
1	20	February 7, 2008	August 14, 2009
2	20	February 2, 2009	October 8, 2010
3	2	August 21, 2011	

== Characters ==
=== Main ===
- Kai-Lan (voiced by Jade Lianna Peters) is a playful and adventurous 6-year-old Chinese-American girl and the host of the show with a big heart. During the show, she and her friends have to solve problems that come up during their daily lives. Kai-Lan speaks both English and Mandarin Chinese. She can also translate the languages. She loves dinosaurs, dogs, cats, rabbits, roosters, and hearts and she plays tambourine in her music group.
- Ye-Ye (voiced by Clem Cheung (English dialogue) and Ben Wang (Chinese dialogue)) is Kai-Lan's playful, thoughtful, and caring paternal grandfather and legal guardian. He was born in Hong Kong and passed on his traditions to his granddaughter. He also provides Kai-Lan with gentle guidance, leading her to find her own answers, at her own pace. He can play the tuba with surprises coming out of it like bubbles and confetti. He also enjoys picking apples and making dumplings for Kai-Lan and all of her animal friends. He's known to pop out of places unexpectedly, but his friends are always happy about it.
- Rintoo (voiced by Jack Samson) is a rambunctious and energetic yellow 5-year-old front lisp-accented Bengal tiger. Sometimes, Rintoo acts before he thinks, which causes problems. While he spends a lot of time with Hoho, his actual best friend besides Kai-Lan is Tolee. He loves dragons, rabbits, horses, eagles and race cars and in Kai-Lan's music group, he plays xylophone.
- Tolee (voiced by Khamani Griffin) is a 5-year-old gray koala who loves pandas, pigs, butterflies, ladybugs, and fruit. He is intelligent and always thinks before he acts and sometimes worries too much, but he never lets that stop him from having a great time with his friends. Kai-Lan and her friends can always rely on him for good ideas. Tolee also has a stuffed panda he affectionately named Pandy, and Tolee loves Pandy so much that he cannot imagine being without him. He is the vocalist in Kai-Lan's music group, but if he plays a musical instrument, he'll play guitar.
- Hoho (voiced by Angie Wu) is an energetic 3-year-old white monkey and is the smallest and youngest of Kai-Lan's friends which makes him go first in activities. He is very hyperactive and bounces a lot, and whenever he does it, a spring sound can be heard, so he can often be found jumping on his friends' heads. He's full of boundless energy and nothing makes him happier than being the center of attention, and because he is so young he does not always listen well. Hoho likes bananas, monkeys, and stars and he is the resident DJ in Kai-Lan's music group. He cannot always control his emotions and can sometimes have a fiery temper when he does not get his way, so he sometimes needs help.
- Lulu (voiced by Beverly Duan) is a sweet and intelligent 6-year-old light pink rhinoceros. She has a red balloon tied around her horn that helps her fly. Lulu is always seen as being there to help her friends. Her musical instrument is a piano or a keyboard. Her favorite fruit is lychee. She likes balloons, tea parties, dancing, playing house, and dressing up like a fairy. She is very nice, energetic, and sweet.
- Mr. Sun is one of the main characters in the series. In the beginning of every episode, he is found sleeping. Kai-Lan tickles him so she can start her day. After that, he sometimes bursts out sun fuzzies which are miniature versions of him and they tickle Kai-Lan. At night, he's called Mr. Moon and has moon fuzzies. He plays a French horn.
- In one corner of Kai-Lan's backyard is a teeming mini-metropolis of ants called Ant City who deliver mail and build things. San San (voiced by Zachary Gordon) is their leader along with his two right-hand ants, Bubu (voiced by Luke Manriquez) and Fufu (voiced by Kyla Rae Kowaleswski).

=== Recurring ===
- Howard (voiced by Khamani Griffin) is an owl who delivers letters and only speaks in hoots.
- Mr. Fluffy (voiced by Austin Chan in "Everybody's Hat Parade" and "The Snowiest Ride", Jeremy Herzig in "Happy Chinese New Year", "Roller Rintoo", "Hoho's Big Flight" and "Ni Hao, Halloween" and Elan Garfias in some episodes from season 2) is a hamster and baker.
- Mei Mei, Chinese for "younger sister", (voiced by Laura Marano) is a shy blue polar bear and is often Mr. Fluffy's assistant and partner.
- Stompy (voiced by Hsiang Lo) is a big, playful blue elephant.
- Gu Nai Nai (voiced by Ming-Na Wen) is Kai-Lan's grandaunt and Ye-Ye's sister.
- Xiao Xi Gua, meaning "little watermelon", (voiced by Olivia Hatton) is a baby panda who loves to eat watermelon.
- The Peeking Mice (voiced by Jack Samson, Khamani Griffin, and Angie Wu) are little black mice who are often seen playing music.
- Mr. Hoppy (voiced by E. G. Daily in "Everybody's Hat Parade" and "Wait, Hoho, Wait!" and Kwesi Boakye in "Kai-Lan's Carnival") is a frog. He is initially depicted as lime green and speaking in ribbits. Later in the series, Hoppy is neon green and capable of speech.
- Tong (voiced by Tyler Kohanek) is the leader of the Chinese acrobats.
- The Snails (voiced by assorted members of the cast especially Olivia Fine, Kwesi Boakye, Zachary Gordon, and Brittany Chen) live in Kai-Lan's backyard.
- The Worms (voiced by assorted members of the cast, especially Olivia Fine, Kwesi Boakye, Zachary Gordon, and Brittany Chen) live in Kai-Lan's backyard.
- The Monkey King (voiced by Jack Cygan) is a monkey superhero who lives in the sky.
- The Fox King (voiced by James Sie) is a fox from the Fox Kingdom.
- Xin Xin (voiced by Terrell Ransom Jr.) is a baby fox from the Fox Kingdom.
- The Foxes are red foxes who live in the Fox Kingdom.
- The Bear Queen (voiced by Lucy Liu) is a bear from the Bear Kingdom.
- Tian Tian (voiced by Olivia Fine) is a baby bear from the Bear Kingdom.
- The Bears are brown bears from the Bear Kingdom.

== DVD releases ==
Ni Hao, Kai-Lan home video releases
Season		Episodes	DVD release dates
Season		Episodes	Region 1
1	2008–09	15	Volume 1: Super Special Days: August 12, 2008; Episodes: "Dragonboat Festival" • "Beach Day" • "Twirly Whirly Flyers" • "Everybody's Hat Parade" Volume 2: Celebrate with Kai-Lan: January 6, 2009; Episodes: "Happy Chinese New Year!" • "Safari Pals" • "Kai-Lan's Campout" • "Tolee's Rhyme Time" Volume 3: Kai-Lan's Great Trip to China: July 14, 2009; Episodes: "Kai-Lan's Trip to China" • "Rain or Shine" • "The Ant Playground" Volume 4: Kai-Lan's Carnival: October 6, 2009; Episodes: "Kai-Lan's Carnival" • "Lulu Day" • "Roller Rintoo" • "Wait, Hoho, Wait"
2	2009–10	3	Volume 5: Princess Kai-Lan: October 5, 2010; Episodes: "Princess Kai-Lan" • "Lulu's Cloud" • "The Moon Festival"

== Awards and nominations ==
Year	Award	Category	Recipients and nominees	Outcome
2008	Artios Award	Outstanding Achievement in Casting – Animation TV Programming	Sarah Noonan and Meredith Layne	Nominated
2009	Annie Award	Best Storyboarding in an Animated Television Production	Notes	Nominated
2010	Daytime Emmy Awards	Outstanding Special Class Animated Program	Sascha Paladino, Mary Harrington, Jeff DeGrandis and Andrew Huebner	Nominated

== Video games ==
The success of Ni Hao, Kai-Lan spawned its own video game series, supported by various gaming consoles and platforms:

- Ni Hao, Kai-Lan: Super Game Day (Wii, PS2) – released, October 26, 2009
- Ni Hao, Kai-Lan: New Year's Celebration (DS) – released, November 3, 2009
