= Brian Lacey (entertainment executive) =

- Education: Saint Michael's College (VT); Clark University
- Occupation: Entertainment executive
- Known for: Founder of Lacey Entertainment
- Website: www.laceyentertainment.com

Brian Lacey is the president and founder of Lacey Entertainment, a New York-based television company.

== Career ==
=== Early career ===
In the mid-1980s, Lacey served as Vice-President and General Manager of World Events Productions, an American company specializing in animation and international distribution.

In 1989, Lacey co-founded Zodiac Entertainment with Peter Keefe. The company was a television production and marketing venture formed in partnership with Central Independent Television of the UK. Zodiac Entertainment produced several animated television series, including Widget, Mr. Bogus, and Twinkle, the Dream Being. In 1993, Lacey left the company following its decision to cease production operations.

In 1994, Lacey founded Lacey Entertainment, a television marketing and distribution company.

=== 4Kids Entertainment ===
In 1993, Lacey joined 4Kids Entertainment as an International Sales Consultant, where he worked on global distribution and marketing for the Pokémon anime series. Lacey was also involved with the distribution of many other children's animated television series, including Yu-Gi-Oh! and Teenage Mutant Ninja Turtles. From 2003 to 2012, Lacey served as the vice-president International for 4Kids Entertainment.

Lacey was the executive producer and global distributor of Shin-chan during the early 2000s. Lacey also served as co-executive producer for the young children's series The Mr. Men Show.

== Personal life ==
Brian Lacey graduated from Saint Michael's College, Vermont in 1972. He was awarded an honorary doctorate by St. Michael's College in 2017.

Lacey is also the founder and director of the Kilkea Foundation, a non-profit foundation that supports college scholarship programs.
