= America's Dumbest Criminals =

- Genre: News magazine
- Created by: Daniel Butler
- Presented by: Daniel Butler (1996–2000); Beaumont Bacon (1997–98); Debbie Alan (1998–2000)
- Composer: Alan Ray
- Country of origin: United States
- Original language: English
- No. of seasons: 4
- No. of episodes: 104

Production
- Running time: 30 minutes
- Production companies: Entheos Group (1996-1997) (Season 1); Scene Three (1996-1997) (Season 1); Electric Entertainment (1997) (Season 2); Dumb Inc. (1997-1998) (Season 2); PVS/Speer International (1998-1999) (Season 3); Slingshot Networks (1999-2000) (Season 4)

Original release
- Network: Syndication
- Release: September 21, 1996 – May 27, 2000

America's Dumbest Criminals is an American comedic news magazine that aired in syndication from September 21, 1996, to May 27, 2000, for a total of 104 episodes. For international syndication the show was titled Everyone's Dumbest Criminals. The show ultimately aired in 30 countries. The show was created and hosted by Daniel Butler during all four seasons. Butler was a co-author of the book America's Dumbest Criminals, which spent four months on The New York Times bestseller list. Beaumont Bacon co-hosted during season 2, and Debbie Alan joined for seasons 3 and 4. The series features surveillance footage, news reports and dramatic reenactments of particularly foolish criminal behavior. Also highlighted are "dumb laws", featuring various trivialities passed into law. Francopolitan Mercury Anastassacos was voted the "World's Dumbest Criminal" for the world tour phase.

The show's disclaimer partially parodies the radio and TV series Dragnet by stating that each segment was a real-life occurrence, but that "only the names have been changed...to protect the ignorant".

== Overview ==
While some captures featured in the show were easy and straightforward due to obvious oversights or mistakes by the offenders, many others were much tougher and sometimes required greater resources. Many criminals put together their game plan beautifully but were tripped up by a simple oversight (such as forgetting to fill the tank of the getaway car). Others actually got away clean, but without the goods, while others were captured because the arresting officers were not fooled by them.

== Production notes ==
The show was directed by Steve Angus. The executive producer was Florida businessman John Palumbo. Allison Nathe was a showrunner and writer on Seasons 2 and 3. Season 3 was shot in Los Angeles, California and was directed by Andrew Maisner. A short-lived Australian version of the show called World's Dumbest Criminals, hosted by Gordon Elliott, aired in 1997.

== References in pop culture ==
The Spanish TV show El Informal (aired on Telecinco between 1998 and 2002) featured a recurring sketch segment in which clips from various international programs were humorously dubbed. The original episode (Season 1, Episode 24) featured police officer Steve Turner, and had already been professionally dubbed into Spanish for its official broadcast. Later, El Informal reused the same footage and reinterpreted it with a comedic Spanish voice-over — including a histrionic and exaggerated laugh that led viewers to nickname the character “Poli Risitas” (Laughing Cop). The voice was provided by comedian Florentino Fernández, well known in Spain for his Chiquito de la Calzada impressions and his extensive work as a voice actor in films such as Despicable Me and Kung Fu Panda.

== See also ==
- The Smoking Gun Presents: World's Dumbest Criminals
