= Lacey Entertainment =

American entertainment company

- Company type: Private
- Industry: Entertainment
- Founded: 1994
- Headquarters: New York
- Key people: Brian Lacey
- Website: www.laceyentertainment.com

Lacey Entertainment is an American entertainment company that was founded by Brian Lacey in 1994. The company has been involved in the creation, production, packaging and distribution of a range of entertainment content, including films, documentaries, light entertainment, and children's animated programs.

== Overview ==
Lacey Entertainment has arranged broadcast placement for various programs on networks and platforms including Disney Channel, Nickelodeon, Cartoon Network, BBC, ITV Network, GMTV, Sky TV, TF1, France Television, M6, Lagardere, YTV, Mediaset, RTL II, TEN Network, Nine Network, Telecinco, Antena 3, Télé-Quebec, Universal Kids, as well as on several over-the-top (OTT) media services.

Brian Lacey has served as an executive producer on co-production projects involving broadcasters and producers in France, United Kingdom, Canada, Japan, Korea, and other Asian countries.

== Timeline ==
Lacey Entertainment was founded in 1994 by Brian Lacey, who has previously worked on children's animated series' including Pokémon, Yu-Gi-Oh, and Teenage Mutant Ninja Turtles.

In 1996, the company introduced the light entertainment series America's Dumbest Criminals. Although the company was not the U.S distributor for the series, it co-owns rights to the brand.

In 1997, Lacey Entertainment co-produced the Mr. Men and Little Miss property, contributing to the 52 episode comedy series, The Mr. Men Show, which was initially release in the United States via first-run syndication and later broadcast on Cartoon Network.

During the early 2000s, the company worked on the international rollout of the Japanese animated series Crayon Shin-chan in more than 90 countries, with Brian Lacey as executive producer for the English-language adaptation.

In 2016, the company reached a broadcast agreement with Viacom for worldwide (excluding the United States) distribution of the children's animated series Kiva Can Do!, produced by the Dublin-based studio Kavaleer Productions, for airing on Nick Jr. Channel platforms. The series was later broadcast in 24 languages and in more than 130 countries.
