= Goomer =

Spanish comic book series

- Created by: Nacho Moreno and Ricardo Martinez
- Genre: Humor, slapstick
- Publisher: Editorial El País/Altea, Ediciones El Jueves (Colección Titanic), Ediciones B, Astiberri, Grijalvo and others.
- Original publication period: 1988–present
- Country of origin: Spain
- Language of origin: Spanish

Goomer is a fictional character and a comic book antihero who appears in some comic books series created since 1988 by the comic writer Ignacio (Nacho) Moreno and artist Ricardo Martinez for "El Pequeño País" Sunday newspaper, later published in other journals and adapted to an animated film, all in Spain.

== Plot ==
Goomer is the satirical story of a chubby Earthman living on a distant planet inhabited by an intelligent civilization. In the Comic books are disclosed various types of ways of life, creepy characters and unknown life forms, but sometimes they are terribly innocent compared to the starring inhabitant from Earth. Its central character is Goomer, an Earthman Spanish expatriate who represents a working class Spanish picaro, with low academic level and a lot of chutzpah. Goomer is a carrier (space trucker) rascal, liar, coarse, short, paunchy and bald who lands on a planet where he decides to stay.

The space carrier Goomer decides on their new adoption planet without working at the expense of his Alien female partner. That's what she believes is his girlfriend she is a three-eyed alien called Elma, constantly pimped by Goomer. She is relatively attractive, but Goomer always prefers to try to seduce the younger sister of his girlfriend, much more attractive and youthful. The little sister is a college student. Goomer goes after other women and his dream is become polygamous. It also has a friend, an alien "Op", who, when Goomer can not pimping his girlfriend Elma, he also tries to scrounge. Op later became polygamous, however, Op suffers the negative aspects of polygamy.

Other comic book characters are the parents of Elma, a female Space cockroach with whom Goomer has an affair, betraying Elma and a male "Alien lift" with which Elma has, in turn, an affair. Elma's father has a personality very similar to Goomer, while Elma's mother has a personality similar to Elma.

The Comic series, which began sporadically and is just unbound, develops according to its consolidation a plot of tricks and deceptions used by the central characters, especially the disastrous relationship of the starring couple. It also shows the routine, monotonous, and conventional life on the planet and its absurd reality as a parody of terrestrial culture in Spain and Western popular culture. The series has changed its theme, adapting it also to the different editorial lines of the different newspapers with different political orientations where it was published.

== Media ==
Goomer is the work of Ricardo Martinez, a Chilean born in 1956, draftsman, and Spanish Nacho Moreno, born in 1957, screenwriter. They are childhood friends from Vitoria. Goomer is the result of several years of working together in different projects, which in 1987 were able to maintain continuity when publishing for the Sunday supplement of the newspaper "El País". Goomer was published for the first time on April 10, 1988, at number 332, in "El pequeño País" passing in 1990 to the Sunday supplement of "El Mundo" and in 1992, to "El Jueves" Goomer appeared in more than five hundred publications, and this character came to play a movie. The cartoon has also been taken for material intended for practicing Spanish as a foreign language for Virtual Center "María Moliner" in the Ministry of Education in Brazil.

In 1999, an adaptations to animated movie was released, entitled Goomer, directed by Jose Luis Feito and Carlos Varela prized with a "Goya award".

== Awards and nominations ==
- 2005 nominee in Haxtur award, International Comic Asturian.
- 2000 Haxtur Award Nominee "Humor"
- 2002 Haxtur Award Nominee "Humor"
- 2011 Haxtur Award Nominee "Humor"
- 2025 Divisional Silver Reuben Award Winner https://nationalcartoonists.com/reubenwinners-2026/
