= Beverly Duan =

American actress

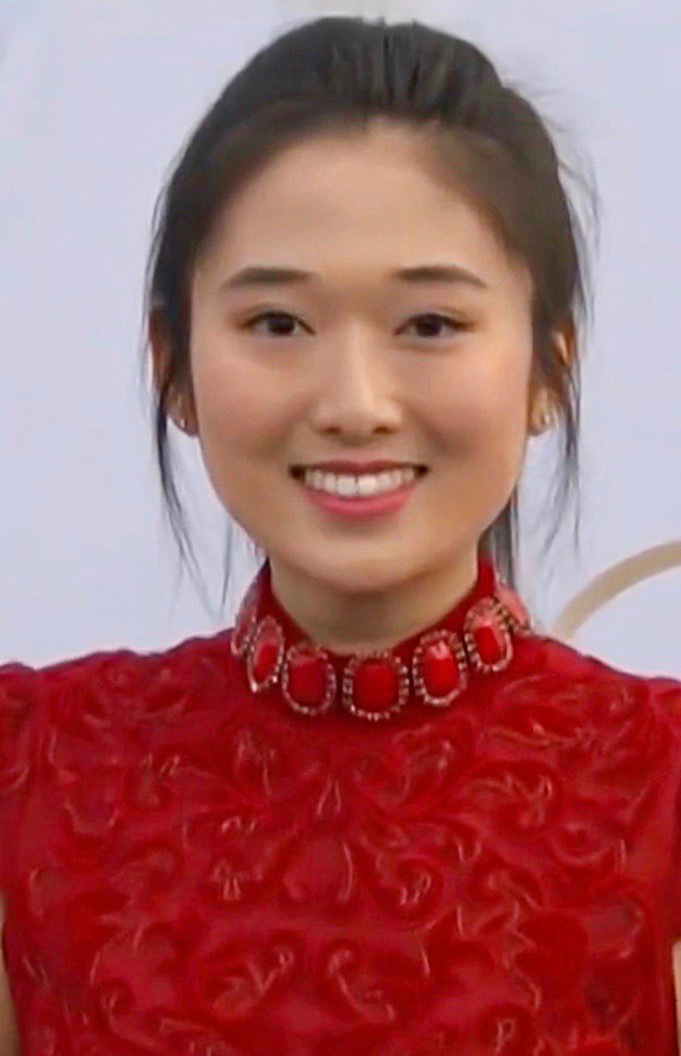
- Duan at the 2019 Screen Actors Guild Awards
- Born: December 19, 1999 (age 26); Los Angeles, California, U.S.
- Occupations: Actress; musician; singer
- Years active: 2002–present
- Musical career
- Genres: Pop; R&B
- Instruments: Vocals; piano
- Website: beverlyduan.com

Beverly Duan (born December 19, 1999) is an American actress. Her first appearance on television was as a little girl in commercials on the Los Angeles television station KSCI Channel 18. After appearing in commercials and doing voiceovers for radio stations in Southern California, she received wider recognition for her portrayal of Lulu on the Nickelodeon television series Ni Hao, Kai-Lan, which aired from 2008 until 2011.

== Early life ==
Duan was born in Los Angeles, California. Duan began receiving classical piano training by age four, performing at music festivals and competing at conventions. She studied under the statewide Music Teachers' Association of California music program and passed music examinations in piano for the California Certificate of Merit Level 10. She attended Fairmont Private School and graduated from Troy High School in Orange County. She attended Jin's Dance Studio, where she was part of the Lyrical Youth Ensemble program, competing all over the United States and internationally.

== Career ==
Duan was cast in a series of commercials for KSCI LA Channel 18 in 2002 as a little girl in "Live Long, Be Healthy". She later auditioned for a role in the Nickelodeon series Ni Hao, Kai-Lan, ultimately winning the role of Lulu. Ni Hao, Kai-Lan saw Duan portraying a bilingual role, requiring her to speak in her native English and learn Mandarin-Chinese. The series became a hit for the network, propelling Duan to more mainstream success. The series received numerous awards nominations, including one for the Daytime Emmy Awards. Duan recorded part of the opening theme song for the series. She later recorded the holiday song in the episode "Happy Chinese New Year".

In 2020, Duan released a cover of "Hero".

== Philanthropy ==
In 2015, Duan filmed a Teen Talk public service announcement (PSA) to make listeners aware of the importance of working "together" to stop bullying. In 2014, she curated a holiday event at a California senior center. She said, of her role as the event organizer, that "I believe we can all find ways to give back to our community and make the world a better place."

During the COVID-19 pandemic, Duan donated to a number of organizations and charities in America and China. She has performed at charity relief events including California's Stand Together benefit concert. In February 2020, she participated in California's Stand Together benefit to raise funds for hospitals to purchase respirator masks and medical supplies. In March 2020, Duan made a personal donation of N95 masks to California's Police Department. In 2020, she launched a campaign to protect frontline workers from COVID-19 and encouraged her fans to donate masks in their communities. She explained that she believes people "can change the world when we work united[...]Even in darkness there is hope."

== Personal life ==
Duan was born and raised in California.

== Filmography ==
=== Television and film roles ===
Year	Title	Role	Notes
2008–2011	Ni Hao, Kai-Lan	Lulu	Main voice role

=== Video games ===
Year	Title	Role	Notes
2009	Ni Hao, Kai-Lan: New Year's Celebration	Lulu	Voice role; Nintendo DS
2009	Ni Hao, Kai-Lan: Super Game Day	Lulu	Voice role; Wii
2009	Ni Hao, Kai-Lan: Super Game Day	Lulu	Voice role; PlayStation 2
