= Werner Nekes =

German film director

Werner Nekes (29 April 1944 – 22 January 2017) was a German experimental film director, and a collector of historical optical objects.

== Biography ==
Born in Erfurt, Nekes grew up in Duisburg and went to school in Oberhausen and Mülheim. From 1963 on, he studied linguistics and psychology in Freiburg and Bonn, where he directed a student film club. From 1965 onward, he began to experiment with 8 mm, then with 16 mm film, making his first experimental film. He became acquainted with Dore O., who was still painting at the time. They moved to Hamburg and married in 1967. Dore O. was involved in most of his films as an actress, and also began to shoot her own experimental films. Together with Helmut Herbst, Thomas Struck, Klaus Wyborny and Heinz Emigholz, they founded the Filmmacher-Cooperative Hamburg.

In 1968, his 10-minute short film schwarzhuhnbraunhuhnschwarzhuhnweißhuhnrothuhnweiß oder put-putt received an International Filmpreis in São Paulo. In 1969 he received a Bambi Award for his previous work and the Deutscher Filmpreis for jüm-jüm (1967) in 1970. In 1972, films by Nekes were shown at Documenta 5 in Kassel in the "Filmschau: New European Cinema" section.

In 1980, he made his first feature film, Uliisses. In 1986, Nekes filmed what would be considered his most famous film ever, the pop-up parody Johnny Flash with Helge Schneider as a rising hit star in the leading role. Christoph Schlingensief was a recording director, camera assistant and actor. They had met in 1982. Both taught at the Hochschule für Gestaltung Offenbach am Main (1982–1984). In the early 1970s, Nekes had a professorship for experimental film at the Hochschule für bildende Künste Hamburg (1970–1972).

Nekes collected everything related to the production of film, such as optical toys, laterna magica, thaumatropes, praxinoscopes, zoetropes, wax museums, and much more, whose techniques he also used in his films. Over the years, he has brought together an extensive pre-cinematic collection of international significance. Nekes' collection of the archaeology of the moving image has been exhibited several times in notable museums around the world, it appeared in books and exhibition catalogues, and was featured in the television series Media Magica (1996) and in Nekes' documentary Was geschah wirklich zwischen den Bildern? (1985).

Attempts to present Nekes' collection in a permanent exhibition space have so far failed. The last project, so far, planned to show the collection in an old tower on the site of the former Landesgartenschau in Mülheim, where Nekes built a camera obscura.

In 2009, Nekes was admitted to the class of the arts of the North Rhine-Westphalian Academy of Sciences, Humanities and the Arts.

Nekes last lived in Mülheim. He died there on 22 January 2017.

== Awards ==
- 1969: Bambi Awards for his creations
- 1970: Filmband in Silber for jüm-jüm
- 1972: Special prize at IFF Mannheim for T-WO-MEN
- 1974: Ruhrpreis for arts and sciences
- 1975: Filmband in Silber for hynningen
- 1981: Preis der deutschen Filmkritik for Beuys
- 1984: Deutscher Kritikerpreis for Uliisses
- 2014: Helen Hill Award

== Filmography ==
- 1968: schwarzhuhnbraunhuhnschwarzhuhnweißhuhnrothuhnweiß oder put-putt
- 1973: Diwan
- 1976: Lagado
- 1978: Mirador
- 1979: Hurrycan
- 1982: Uliisses
- 1985: Film Before Film (Was geschah wirklich zwischen den Bildern?)
- 1986: Johnny Flash
- 1991: Candida
- 1997: The Night of the Painter (Der Tag des Malers)
