= Vera Tech Phantom Sentinel =

American UAV

The Phantom Sentinel was an American unmanned aerial vehicle developed by VeraTech Aero. Utilising a "boomerang" design, the Phantom Sentinel was designed to be nearly invisible. Driven by electric-engine propellers, the rapid rotation of its entire body during flight meant that persistence of vision would render it translucent in the same way as fan blades. First flying in 2006, the Phantom Sentinel was designed for hand launch and was equipped with a high-speed camera providing 360-degree video coverage. It was electrically powered and designed to have an endurance of 40 minutes.
