= Optical toys =

Toys based on optical effects

Optical toys form a group of devices with some entertainment value combined with a scientific, optical nature. Many of these were also known as "philosophical toys" when they were developed in the 19th century.

People must have experimented with optical phenomena since prehistoric times and played with objects that influenced the experience of light, color and shadow. In the 16th century some experimental optical entertainment - for instance camera obscura demonstrations - were part of the cabinets of curiosities that emerged at royal courts. Since the 17th century, optical tabletop instruments such as the compound microscope and telescope were used for parlour entertainment or salon presentations in richer households.

Other, larger devices - such as peep shows - were usually exhibited by travelling showmen at fairs.

The phenakistiscope, zoetrope, praxinoscope and flip books are often seen as precursors of film, leading to the invention of cinema at the end of the 19th century. In the 21st century, this narrow teleological vision was questioned and the individual qualities of these media gained renewed attention of researchers in the fields of the history of film, science, technology and art. The new digital media raised questions about our knowledge of media history. The tactile qualities of optical toys that allow viewers to study and play with the moving image in their own hands, seem more attractive in a time when digital transformation makes the moving image less tangible.

Several philosophical toys were developed through scientific experimentation, then turned into scientific amusements that demonstrated new ideas and theories in the fields of optics, physics, electricity, mechanics, etc. and ended up as toys for children.

== List of optical toys ==
date	name	inventor(s)	type/function	note
n/a	Camera obscura	n/a	projection	a natural phenomenon, applied with lens since around 1550, portable box since early 17th century
730 BCE (circa)	Lens	n/a	burning glass?	the function of the oldest known lens, the Nimrud lens, is unclear (it may only have been used for decoration), lenses were probably seldom used as a magnifying glass or as glasses before the 13th century
100 BCE (circa)	Chinese magic mirror	n/a	projection	probably introduced centuries or thousands of years before they became popular during the Han dynasty
0 (circa)	Prism	n/a	dispersion	Seneca noted that a prism could form the same colors as the rainbow
150 (circa)	Newton disc / color-top (chameleon top)	Ptolemy	additive optical color mixing	first known description by Ptolemy, later falsely attributed to Isaac Newton
850 (circa)	reading stone	Abbas ibn Firnas?	magnification	not regularly used before circa 1000
1437?	Peep box / raree show	Leon Battista Alberti?		especially popular from the 17th to the 19th century
1485 (circa)?	Perspective anamorphosis	Leonardo da Vinci?	anamorphosis	
1500s	Tabula scalata	n/a		extant copies from late 16th century, also referred to in literature of the time (including works by Shakespeare)
1500s?	Pleasurable spectacles (faceted and coloured glass lenses)			described and illustrated in I. Prevost's La Première partie des subtiles et plaisantes inventions (1584), but the distortion of vision when looking through transparent objects must have been known much earlier (probably long before the use of reading stones)
1600s	Mirror anamorphosis	n/a	anamorphosis	reached Europe around 1620, possibly from China via Constantinople
1608	Telescope	Hans Lippershey? Zacharias Janssen? Jacob Metius?		
1620s?	Compound microscope	Cornelis Drebbel?		
>1630s	Mirrored room		multiplication	a room lined with 200 mirrors in the palace of the king of Armenia was described in 1647 by Adam Olearius
1638	Perspective glass	Jean François Niceron?	hidden image	a viewing tube with a faceted lens that brings together selective parts of a picture into one composite image
1650s	Perspective box			viewing box with a lens, false perspective painted on multiple planes in the interior of the box
1659	Magic lantern	Christiaan Huygens	projection	
1730?	Zograscope perspective views	n/a	3D	known in France since 1730 as "optique", it became known as the "zograscope" in England since 1745
1736	Solar microscope	Daniel Gabriel Fahrenheit	projection	
1770s?	Chinese fireworks or Feux pyriques	n/a	animated light effects	
1817	Kaleidoscope	David Brewster		
1822	Polyorama Panoptique	Pierre Seguin?		
1825	Thaumatrope	William Henry Fitton?		introduced by John Ayrton Paris
1827	Kaleidophone	Charles Wheatstone		
1829	Anorthoscope	Joseph Plateau	anamorphosis	marketed shortly since 1836
1833-01	Phénakisticope	Joseph Plateau, Simon Stampfer	animation	
1833	Stereoscope	Sir Charles Wheatstone	3D	mirror version developed by Wheatstone around 1832, presented/published in 1838, prismatic version probably developed simultaneously by Wheatstone, prismatic/lenticular version introduced in 1849 by David Brewster and popularized with production by Jules Duboscq since 1850
1852	Anaglyph 3D	Wilhelm Rollmann	3D	
1858-04	Kaleidoscopic colour-top	John Gorham		
1860	Alethoscope	Carlo Ponti	3D	further developed into the Megalethoscope
1864	Spectropia	J. H. Brown	afterimage	
1866-12	Zoetrope	William Ensign Lincoln	animation	similar devices suggested and exhibited since 1833, now with exchangeable strips
1868 (circa)	The Optic Wonder or Creator of Form	John Gorham	3D	a small metal strip or crystal shape forming the half of a contour image is spun around fast to appear as a full solid 3D object, marketed by Stereoscopic Company (London Stereoscopic & Photographic Co.)
1868	Flip book	John Barnes Linnett	animation	
1877	Praxinoscope	Charles-Émile Reynaud	animation	
1894	Mutoscope	William Kennedy Dickson, Herman Casler	moving pictures	
1896	Kinora	Auguste and Louis Lumière	moving pictures	
1906	Scanimation	Alexander S. Spiegel	animation	originally marketed as magical moving pictures, adapted as scanimation since 2006
1921	Ombro-Cinéma	Saussine	animation	
1939	View-Master	William Gruber	3D	
1952	Lenticular pictures	Victor Anderson	animation	originally invented in 1898 as autostereogram, now popularized as changing/moving pictures
1980	Mandelbrot set visualizations	Benoit Mandelbrot		
1991	Magic Eye	Tom Baccei, Cheri Smith	3D / hidden image	based on random dot stereogram techniques that have been known since 1919, further developed by Béla Julesz and Christopher Tyler
