= Persistence of vision =

Optical illusion

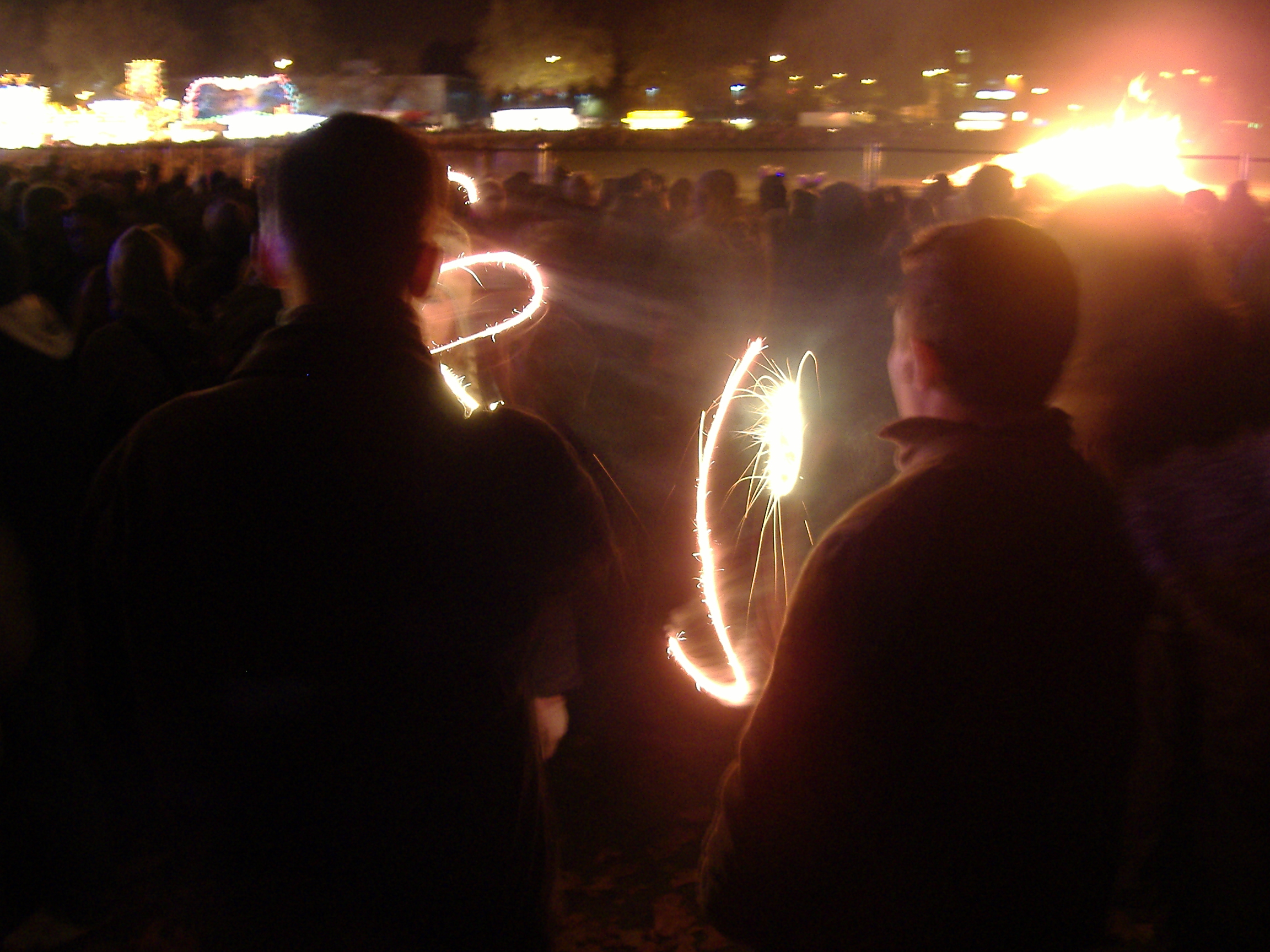
Sparkler's trail effect

Persistence of vision or visual persistence is the optical illusion that occurs when the visual perception of an object continues for some time after the rays of light proceeding from it have ceased to enter the eye. The illusion has also been described as "retinal persistence" when attributed strictly to the retina, and "persistence of impressions" as a more general term that can also apply to the other senses. An example of the phenomenon is the fiery trail from a glowing coal or burning stick that is whirled around in the dark.

Some explanations of the illusion describe either positive afterimages or motion smear (comparable to motion blur in photography, film and video).

Recent theories about visual sensory memory differentiate between higher-level psychological 'informational persistence' and lower-level phenomenal 'visible persistence'.

The human visual system depends on temporal integration in general; it continuously processes visual inputs over time.

"Persistence of vision" can be understood to be the same as "flicker fusion", the effect that images persist when the light that enters the eyes is interrupted at short, regular intervals. When the frequency is too high for the visual system to discern differences between moments, light and dark impressions fuse into a continuous image of the scene with intermediate brightness (defined by the Talbot-Plateau law).

Since its introduction, the term "persistence of vision" has often been claimed to be the explanation for motion perception in optical toys like the phenakistiscope and the zoetrope, praxinoscope, mutoscope, theatre optique (optical theater) and later in cinema. This theory has been disputed long before cinematography's breakthrough in 1895. The illusion of motion as a result of fast intermittent presentations of sequential images is a stroboscopic effect, as explained in 1833 by Simon Stampfer, one of the inventors of the stroboscopic disc (phenakistiscope). If the retention of images lasts longer than the interruptions, it does explain the apparent continuity of the image, which looks weaker, depending on the ratio between exposures and interruptions.

Early descriptions of the illusion attributed the effect purely to the physiology of the eye, particularly the retina. The nervous system later became accepted as an important factor.

== Neurology ==
Although the persistence of a visual impression can be pathological (palinopsia), it can commonly be attributed to incidental yet normal physiological afterimages, or to the aspect of visual sensory memory that is a standard element of human vision.

Vision has a delayed response to stimulus onset, with varying durations of the store, integration and decay after offset. In recent theories about visual sensory memory, a distinction is made between visible persistence and informational persistence. Visible persistence has an inverse relation to the duration and intensity of the stimulus, and presumably depends on neural persistence in the visual pathway. Informational persistence is a subsequent element of higher-level (cortical) processing.

== Natural occurrences and applications ==
Impressions of several natural phenomena and the principles of some optical toys have been attributed to persistence of vision. In 1768, Patrick D'Arcy recognised the effect in "the luminous ring that we see by turning a torch quickly, the fire wheels in the fireworks, the flattened spindle shape we see in a vibrating cord, the continuous circle we see in a cogwheel that turns with speed". Basically everything that resembles motion blur seen in fast-moving objects could be regarded as "persistence of vision".

=== Sparkler's trail effect ===
The apparent line of light behind a fast-moving luminous object such as a sparkler is known as the "sparkler's trail effect".

=== Light painting ===
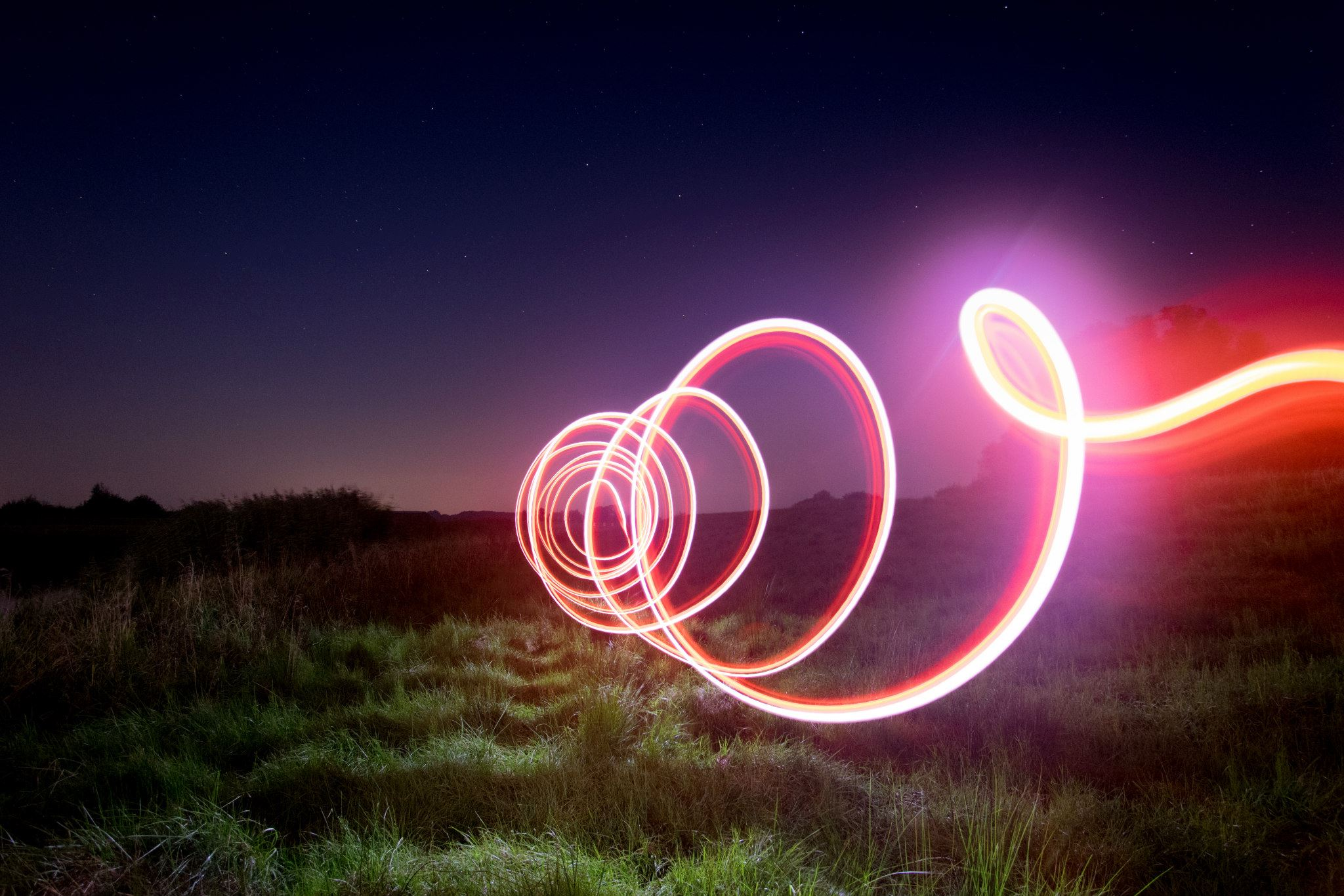
Light Painting Screw by Karsten Knöfler

The effect has occasionally been applied in the arts by writing or drawing with a light source recorded by a camera with a long exposure time.

This technique has been further developed into media with computer-controlled moving light sources (typically LED light), known as S.W.I.M. (Sequential Wave Imprinting Machine). However, like video and television, the technology actually gets rid of the visual trail of fast-moving lights by presenting a stroboscopic sequence of very short visual cues (resulting in a sharp image, still or animated).

=== Color-top / Newton disc ===
Colors on spinning tops or rotating wheels mix if the motion is too fast to register the details. A colored dot then appears as a circle and one line can make the whole surface appear in one uniform hue.

The Newton disc optically mixes wedges of Isaac Newton's primary colors into one (off-)white surface when it spins fast.

=== Thaumatrope ===
In April 1825, the first set of the Thaumatrope was published by W. Phillips (in anonymous association with John Ayrton Paris). The fact that the pictures on either side of the twirling disc are seen as a combined or superposed single image has traditionally been presented as an illustration of retinal persistence. Given the common association with motion streaks of whirled around burning coals or sticks, the principle would sooner be expected to render the fast-moving pictures as unrecognizably smeared across the retina, but this is prevented by the brief visibility of each side. Just like the last frame of one shot in a movie and the next frame of an entirely different shot are clearly perceived as separate images, the alternating pictures of the thaumatrope don't just appear superposed if the depicted figures aren't mentally compatible. Informational persistence would be the more likely cause, and the effect depends on principles of Gestalt psychology, inspired by study of the differences between impressions of quick alternations of two figures –depending on tachistoscope frequencies, distance between the figures, and/or variance in shapes– as studied by Max Wertheimer in 1912.

=== Kaleidoscopic colour-top ===
In April 1858 John Gorham patented his Kaleidoscopic colour-top. This is a top on which two small discs are placed, usually one with colors and a black one with cut-out patterns. When the discs spin and the top disc is retarded into regular jerky motions the toy exhibits "beautiful forms which are similar to those of the kaleidoscope" with multiplied colours. Gorham described how the colours appear mixed on the spinning top "from the duration of successive impressions on the retina". Gorham founded the principle on "the well-known experiment of whirling a stick, ignited at one end" (a.k.a. the sparkler's trail effect).

=== Rubber pencil trick ===
A pencil or another rigid straight line can appear to bend like flexible rubber when wiggled fast enough between fingers, or otherwise undergoing rigid motion.

Persistence of vision has been dismissed as the sole cause of the illusion. It is thought that the eye movements of the observer fail to track the motions of features of the object.

This effect is widely used as an entertaining "magic" trick for children.

== History ==
Phenomena related to flicker fusion and motion blur have been described since antiquity. Film historians have often confused flicker fusion with afterimages that arise after staring at an object, while mostly ignoring the importance of the stroboscopic effect in their explanations of motion perception in film.

=== Historical references to afterimages and motion blur ===
Aristotle (384–322 BC) noted that the image of the sun remained in his vision after he stopped looking at it.

The discovery of persistence of vision is sometimes attributed to the Roman poet Lucretius (c. 15 October 99 BC – c. 55 BC), although he only mentions something similar in connection with images seen in a dream.

Around 165 AD, Ptolemy described a rotating potter's wheel with different colors on it in his book Optics. He noted how the different colors of sectors mix into one color and how dots appear as circles when the wheel spins very fast. When lines are drawn across the axis of the disc they make the whole surface appear to be of a uniform color. "The visual impression that is created in the first revolution is invariably followed by repeated instances that subsequently produce an identical impression. This also happens in the case of shooting stars, whose light seems distended on account of their speed of motion, all according to the amount of perceptible distance it passes along with the sensible impression that arises in the visual faculty."

Porphyry (circa 243–305) in his commentary on Ptolemy's Harmonics describes how the senses are not stable but confused and inaccurate. Certain intervals between repeated impressions are not detected. A white or black spot on a spinning cone (or top) appears as a circle of that color and a line on the top makes the whole surface appear in that color. "Because of the swiftness of the movement we receive the impression of the line on every part of the cone as the line moves."

In the 11th century Ibn al-Haytham, familiar with Ptolemy's writings, described how colored lines on a spinning top could not be discerned as different colors but appeared as one new color composed of all the colors of the lines. He deduced that sight needs some time to discern a color. al-Haytam also noted that the top appeared motionless when spun extremely quickly "for none of its points remains fixed in the same spot for any perceptible time".

Leonardo da Vinci wrote in a notebook: "Every body that moves rapidly seems to colour its path with the impression of its hue. The truth of this proposition is seen from experience; thus when the lightning moves among dark clouds the speed of its sinuous flight makes its whole course resemble a luminous snake. So in like manner if you wave a lighted brand its whole course will seem a ring of flame. This is because the organ of perception acts more rapidly than the judgment."

In his 1704 book Opticks, Isaac Newton (1642–1726/27) described a machine with prisms, a lens and a large moving comb with teeth causing alternating colors to be projected successively. If this was done quickly enough, the alternating colours could no longer be perceived separately but were seen as white. Newton compared its principle to the sparkler's trail effect: a gyrating burning coal could appear as a circle of fire because "the sensation of the coal in the several places of that circle remains impress'd on the sensorium, until the coal return again to the same place."

In 1768 Patrick d'Arcy (1725-1779) reported how he had measured a duration of 0.13 seconds for one full rotation of a burning coal while it was seen as a full circle of light. He registered multiple rotations with a purpose-built machine in his garden and with the collaboration of an observer who had superior eyesight (D'Arcy's own eyesight had been damaged in an accident). D'Arcy suspected that the duration may differ between different observers, light intensities of spinning objects, colours and viewing distances. He planned further experiments to determine such possible differences, but no results seem to have been published.

=== 1820–1866: Revolving wheel ===
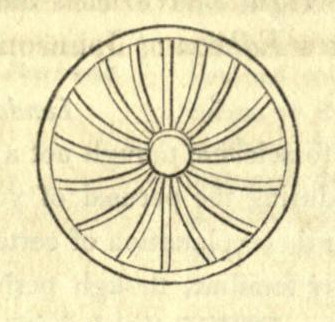
Wood-cut illustration of An Optical Deception (1821)

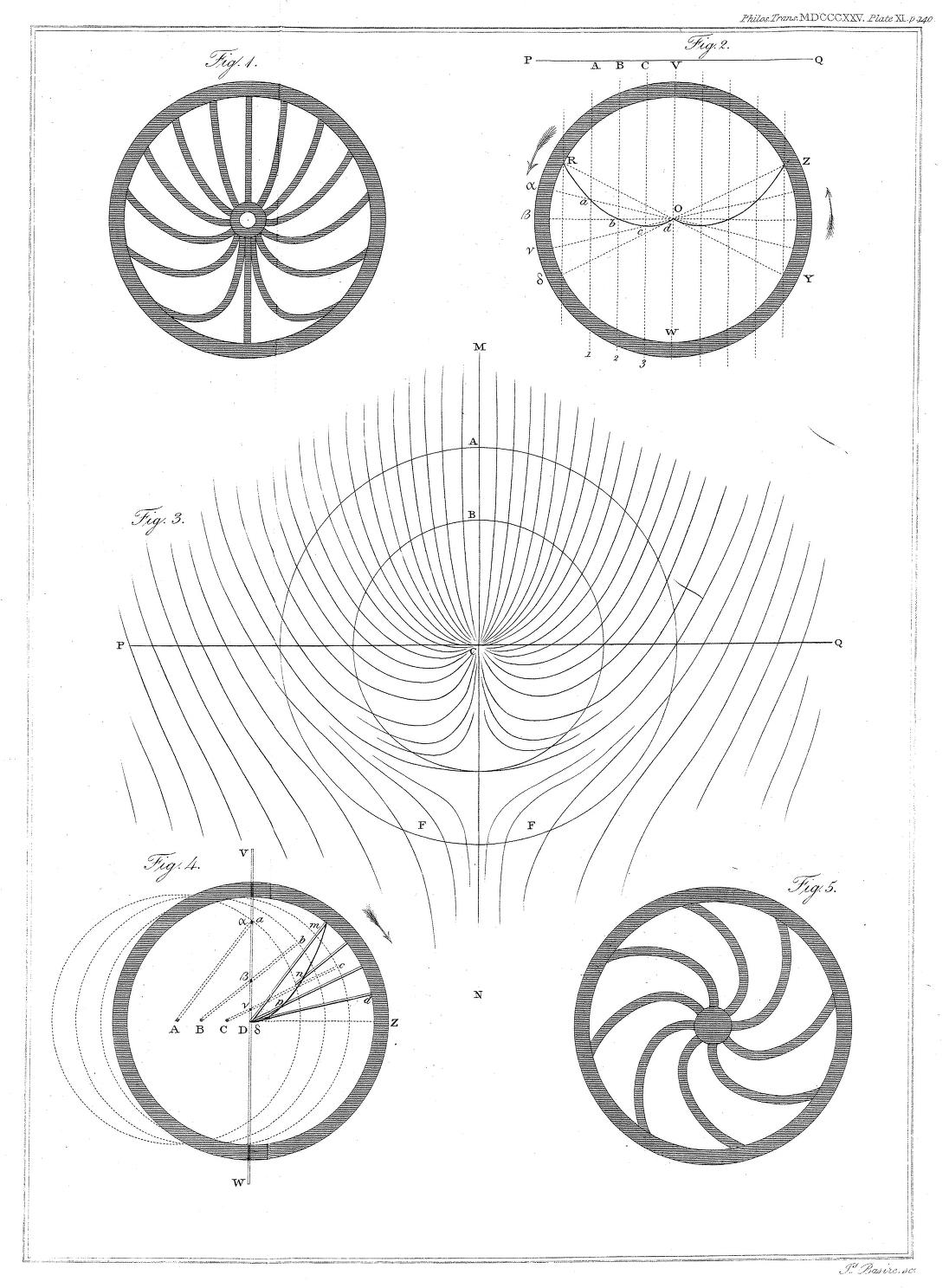
Illustration plate for Peter Mark Roget's Explanation of an Optical Deception in the Appearance of the Spokes of a Wheel Seen through Vertical Apertures (1825)

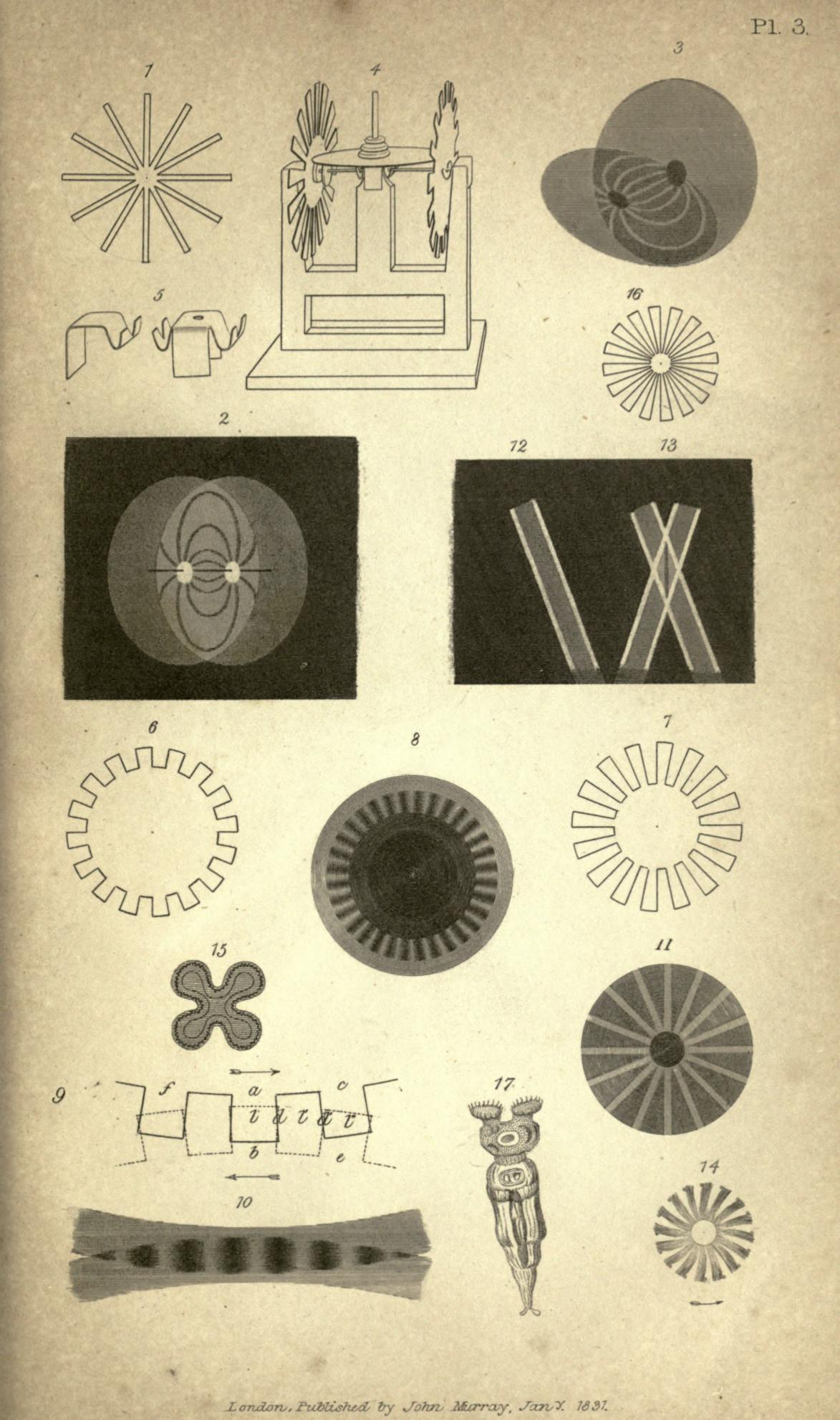
Illustrations of Michael Faraday's experiments with rotating wheels with cogs or spokes (1831)

In 1821 the Quarterly Journal of Science, Literature, and The Arts published a "letter to the editor" with the title Account of an Optical Deception. It was dated Dec. 1, 1820 and attributed to "J.M.", possibly publisher/editor John Murray himself. The author noted that the spokes of a rotating wheel seen through fence slats appeared with peculiar curvatures (see picture). The letter concluded: "The general principles on which this deception is based will immediately occur to your mathematical readers, but a perfect demonstration will probably prove less easy than it appears on first sight". Four years later Peter Mark Roget offered an explanation when reading at the Royal Society on December 9, 1824. He added: "It is also to be noticed that, however rapidly the wheel revolves, each individual spoke, during the moment it is viewed, appears to be at rest." Roget claimed that the illusion is due to the fact "that an impression made by a pencil of rays on the retina, if sufficiently vivid, will remain for a certain time after the cause has ceased." He also provided mathematical details about the apparent curvatures.

As a university student Joseph Plateau noticed in some of his early experiments that when looking from a small distance at two concentric cogwheels which turned fast in opposite directions, it produced the optical illusion of a motionless wheel. He later read Peter Mark Roget's 1824 article and decided to investigate the phenomenon further. He published his findings in Correspondance Mathématique et Physique in 1828 and 1830. In 1829 Plateau presented his then unnamed anorthoscope in his doctoral thesis Sur quelques propriétés des impressions produites par la lumière sur l'organe de la vue. The anorthoscope was a disc with an anamorphic picture that could be viewed as a clear immobile image when the disc was rotated and seen through the four radial slits of a counter-rotating disc. The discs could also be translucent and lit from behind through the slits of the counter-rotating disc.

On 10 December 1830, scientist Michael Faraday wrote a paper for the Journal of the Royal Institution of Great Britain, entitled On a Peculiar Class of Optical Deceptions. Two instances of rotating wheels that appeared to stand still had been pointed out to him and he had read about the somewhat similar palisade illusion in Roget's article. Faraday started experimenting with rotations of toothed cardboard wheels. Several effects had already been described by Plateau, but Faraday also simplified the experiment by looking at a mirror through the spaces between the teeth in the circumference of the cardboard disc. On 21 January 1831, Faraday presented the paper at the Royal Institution, with some new experiments. He had cut concentric series of apertures nearer to the center of a disc (representing smaller cogwheels) with small differences in the number of "cogs" per "wheel". When looking at the mirror through the holes of one of the wheels in the rotating disc, that wheel seemed to stand still while the others would appear to move with different velocities or in the opposite direction.

Plateau was inspired by Faraday's additional experiments and continued the research. In July 1832 Plateau sent a letter to Faraday and added an experimental circle with apparently abstract figures that produced a "completely immobile image of a little, perfectly regular horse" when rotated in front of a mirror. After several attempts and many difficulties Plateau managed to animate the figures between the slits in a disc when he constructed the first effective model of the phénakisticope in November or December 1832. Plateau published his then unnamed invention in a January 20, 1833 letter to Correspondance Mathématique et Physique.

Simon Stampfer claimed to have independently and almost simultaneously invented his very similar Stroboscopischen Scheiben oder optischen Zauberscheiben (stroboscopic discs or optical magic discs) soon after he read about Faraday's findings in December 1832.

Stampfer also mentioned several possible variations of his stroboscopic invention, including a cylinder (similar to the later zoetrope) as well as a long, looped strip of paper or canvas stretched around two parallel rollers (somewhat similar to film) and a theater-like frame (much like the later praxinoscope). In January 1834, William George Horner also suggested a cylindrical variation of Plateau's phénakisticope, but he did not manage to publish a working version. William Ensign Lincoln invented the definitive zoetrope with exchangeable animation strips in 1865 and had it published by Milton Bradley and Co. in December 1866.

== Other theories for motion perception in film ==
In his 1833 patent and his explanatory pamphlet for his stroboscopic discs, Simon Stampfer emphasized the importance of the interruptions of the beams of light reflected by the drawings, while a mechanism would transport the images past the eyes at an appropriate speed. The pictures had to be constructed according to certain laws of physics and mathematics, including the systematic division of a movement into separate moments. He described persistence of vision only as the effect that made the interruptions go unnoticed.

The idea that the motion effects in so-called "optical toys", like the phénakisticope and the zoetrope, may be caused by images lingering on the retina was questioned in an 1868 article by William Benjamin Carpenter. He suggested that the illusion was "rather a mental than a retinal phenomenon".

Early theories of persistence of vision were centered on the retina, while later theories preferred or added ideas about cognitive (brain-centered) elements of motion perception. Many psychological concepts of the basic principle of animation suggested that the blanks in between the images were filled in by the mind.

Max Wertheimer proved in 1912 that test subjects did not see anything between the two different positions in which a figure was projected by a tachistoscope at frequencies ideal for the illusion of one figure moving from one position to the next. He used the Greek letter φ (phi) to designate illusions of motion. At higher speeds, when test subjects believed to see both positions more or less simultaneously, a moving objectless phenomenon was seen between and around the projected figures. Wertheimer supposed this "pure phi phenomenon" was a more direct sensory experience of motion. The ideal animation illusion of motion across the interval between the figures was later called "beta movement".

A visual form of memory known as iconic memory has been described as the cause of persistence of vision. Some scientists nowadays consider the entire theory of iconic memory a myth.

When contrasting the theory of persistence of vision with that of phi phenomena, an understanding emerges that the eye is not a camera and does not see in frames per second. In other words, vision is not as simple as light registering on a medium since the brain has to make sense of the visual data the eye provides and construct a coherent picture of reality. Temporal integration is a critical and continuous aspect of the human visual system in general.

Although psychologists and physiologists have rejected the relevance of the theory of retinal persistence film viewership, film academics and theorists generally have not, and it persists in citations in many classic and modern film-theory texts.

Joseph and Barbara Anderson argue that the phi phenomenon privileges a more constructionist approach to the cinema (David Bordwell, Noël Carroll, Kirstin Thompson) whereas the persistence of vision privileges a realist approach (André Bazin, Christian Metz, Jean-Louis Baudry).

== See also ==
- Afterimage
- Beta movement
- Chronostasis
- Entoptic phenomenon
- Flicker (light)
- Flicker fusion threshold
- Light writing, a physical animation technique that has the appearance of persistence of vision.
- Motion perception
- Phi phenomenon
- The Persistence of Vision (short story)
- Persistence of Vision (film)
