= André Giroux (painter) =

French painter

- Born: April 30, 1801; Paris
- Died: November 18, 1879 (aged 78)
- Education: École des Beaux-Arts
- Known for: photography, painting
- Awards: Prix de Rome en Paysage Historique (1825), Légion d'honneur (1870)

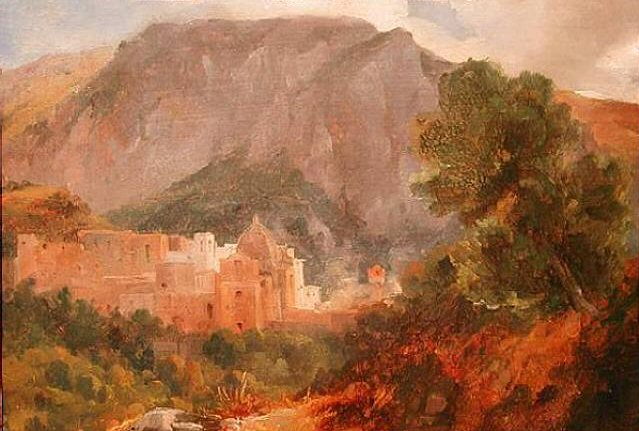

André Giroux (April 30, 1801 – November 18, 1879) was a French photographer and painter. His paintings were mostly landscape art and genre painting, one of which hangs in the Metropolitan Museum of Art. In particular, he restored several genre paintings of medieval ruins and troubadours. Giroux was also a well established art dealer and gave up painting to promote his business selling curiosities. Giroux's work is extensively discussed in Steven Adams' doctoral thesis from the University of Leeds in 2003.

== Background ==
Born in Paris, he was son to François-Simon-Alphonse Giroux, maker of camera equipment for Louis-Jacques-Mandé Daguerre. He attended École des Beaux-Arts beginning in 1821, and was a student of Jacques-Louis David.

He was also known for using the cliché-verre technique.

== Awards ==
- Prix de Rome en Paysage Historique — 1825, Winner (with Chasse de Méléagre)
- Légion d'honneur — 1870, Chevalier
