= Phenakistoscope =

First widespread animation device that created a fluid illusion of motion

Animated GIF of Prof. Stampfer's Stroboscopische Scheibe No. X (Trentsensky & Vieweg 1833)

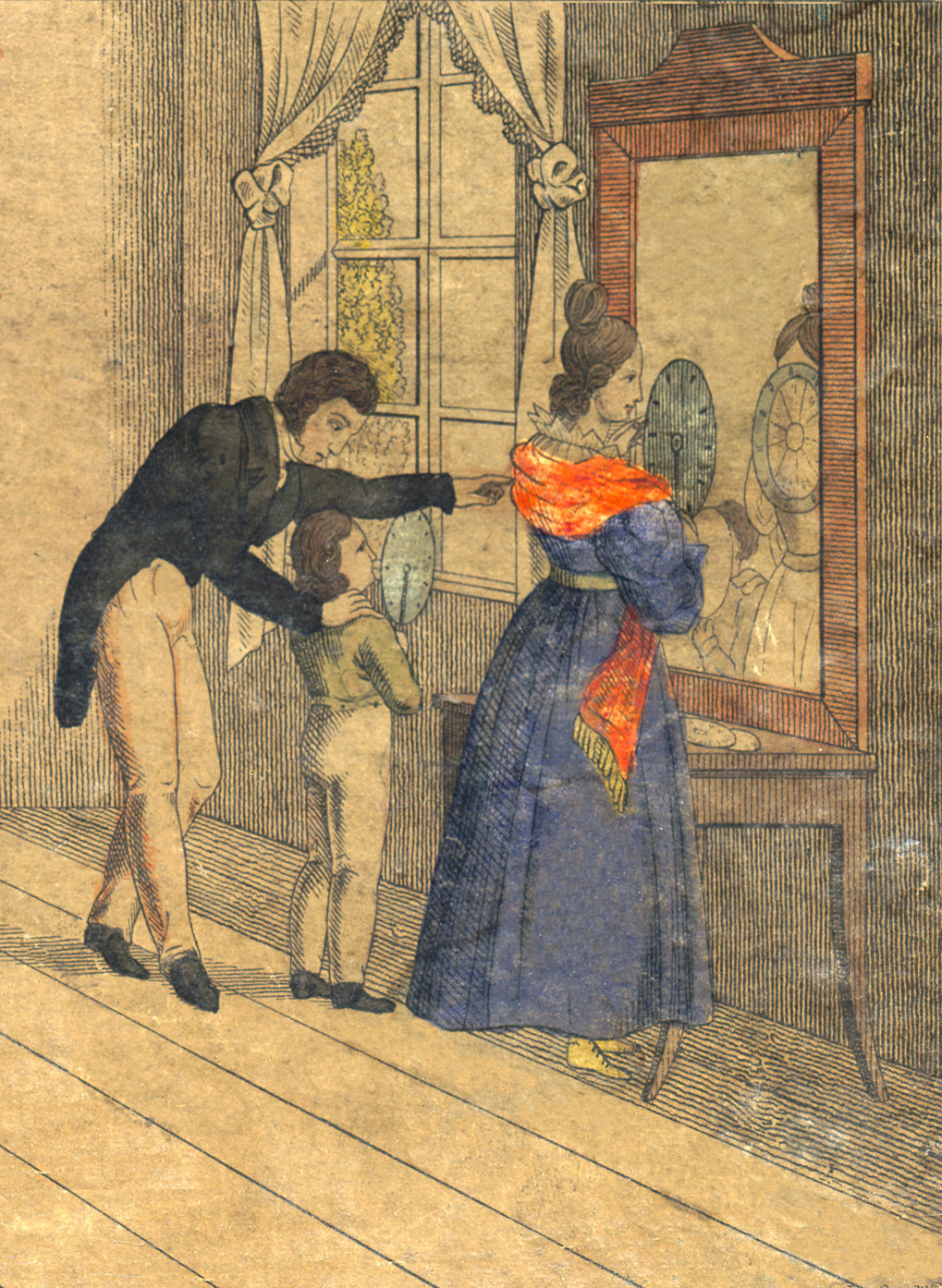
A family viewing animations in a mirror through the slits of stroboscopic discs (detail of an illustration by E. Schule on the box label for Magic Disk - Disques Magiques, c. 1833)

The phenakistoscope (also known by the spellings phénakisticope or phenakistiscope) was the first widespread animation device that created a fluid illusion of motion. Dubbed Fantascope and Stroboscopische Scheiben ('stroboscopic discs') by its inventors, it has been known under many other names until the French product name Phénakisticope became common (along with alternative spellings). The phenakistiscope is regarded as one of the first forms of moving media entertainment that paved the way for the future motion picture and film industry. Similar to a GIF animation, it displays a short continuous loop.

== Etymology and spelling ==
The term phénakisticope (not -scope) was first used by the French company Alphonse Giroux et Compagnie in their application for an import license (29 May 1833) and this name was used on their box sets. Fellow Parisian publisher Junin also used the term phenakisticope, both with and without the accent.

When the product name Phénakisticope was introduced in the French newspaper Le Figaro on 27 June 1833, it was explained to be from the Greek words phenakisticos (or rather φενακίζειν phenakizein "to deceive") and ops (ὤψ "eye"), so it was presumably intended to mean "optical deception" or "optical illusion."

Inventor Joseph Plateau did not give a name to the device when he first published about it in January 1833. Later in 1833, he used phénakisticope in an article to refer to the published versions that he was not involved with. By then, he had an authorized set published as Phantasmascope (by Ackermann in London), some months later changed into Fantascope for a new edition and sets by other animators. In many writings and presentations Plateau used both the terms phénakisticope and fantascope, seemingly accepting phénakisticope as the better-known name and holding on to fantascope as the name he preferred.

The altered spelling phenakistiscope may have been introduced by lithographers Forrester & Nichol in collaboration with optician John Dunn; they used the title "The Phenakistiscope, or, Magic Disc" for their box sets, as advertised in September 1833. The corrupted part -scope was understood to be derived from Greek 'skopos', meaning "aim", "target", "object of attention" or "watcher", "one who watches" (or rather from σκοπεῖν skopein) and was quite common in the naming of optical devices (e.g. Telescope, Microscope, Kaleidoscope, Fantascope, Bioscope).

The further alteration phenakistoscope appeared as early as 1835, in the American Journal of Science and Arts. It became a standard spelling in encyclopedic publications, for instance A Dictionary of Science, Literature, & Art (London, 1842) and the Iconographic Encyclopaedia of Science, Literature, and Art (New York, 1852).

== Technology ==
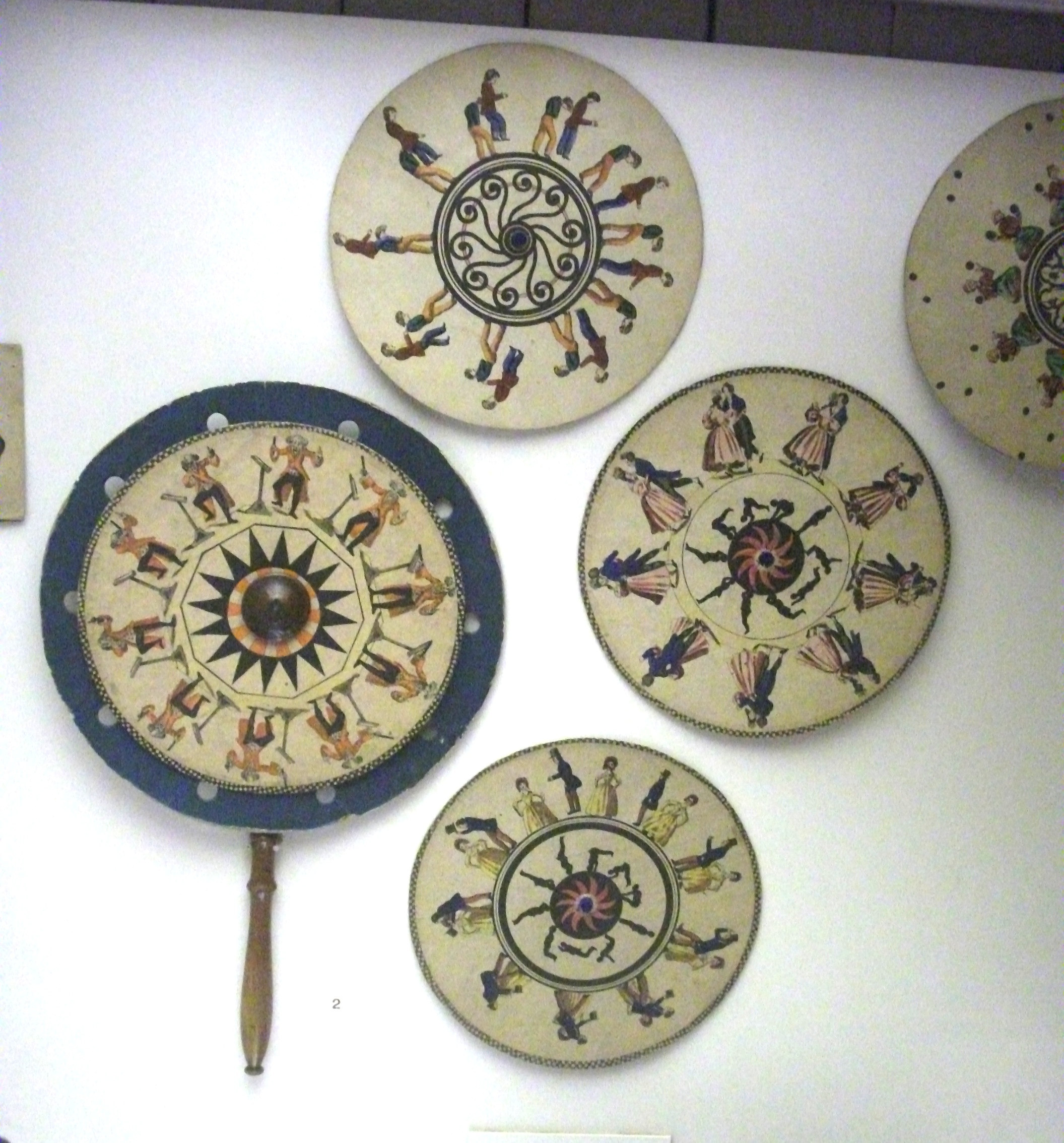
A "Phantasmascope" with cards on display in Bedford Museum, England.

The phenakistoscope is typically a cardboard disc with an array of sequential pictures around its center and evenly spaced rectangular apertures around the rim. To view the pictures in motion, the disc is placed on a handle and spun in front of a mirror while the user looks through the slits from the back of the disc. If the disc spins quickly enough, the visual system fuses the alternating views of the reflected image and the intervening cardboard (a phenomenon known as flicker fusion). During the unnoticed gaps, each image is replaced by the next in the sequence, perceived as the same figure going through the depicted phases of motion.

The stroboscopic view through the slits prevents motion blur in the perception of the spinning pictures – the slimmer the slits, the sharper but darker the image.

If there are as many slits as pictures, the figures appear to move in a fixed position and will not drift across the disc. Fewer images than slots and the images will drift in the opposite direction to that of the spinning disc. More images than slots and the images will drift in the same direction as the spinning disc.

Unlike the zoetrope and other successors, common versions of the phénakisticope could only practically be viewed by one person at a time.

The velocity of the disc causes a slight distortion in the perception of the pictures; they appear a bit slimmer and slightly curved. Animators can counter the effect to some extent by increasing the width of the figures and bend them into the other way as the distorted curves, but the amount of distortion to be compensated varies because it depends on the speed. Most phenakisticope animations are not intended to give a realistic representation and the distortion isn't very obvious in cartoonish pictures.

The distortion and the flicker caused by the rotating slits are not seen in most phénakisticope animations now found online (including the GIF animation on this page), as these are usually animations created with software and do not replicate the actual viewing experience of a phénakisticope. However, they can present the work of the animators in an optimized fashion. Some miscalculated modern re-animations also have the slits rotating (which would appear motionless when viewed through an actual phénakisticope) and the figures moving across the discs where they were supposed to stand still (or standing still when they were supposed to move around).

Most commercially produced discs are lithographic prints that were colored by hand, but also multi-color lithography and other printing techniques have been used by some manufacturers.

== Invention ==
Joseph Plateau's illustration in Corresp. Math. (1833)

The phenakisticope was invented almost simultaneously around December 1832 by the Belgian physicist Joseph Plateau and the Austrian professor of practical geometry Simon Stampfer.

As a university student Plateau noticed in some early experiments that when looking from a small distance at two concentric cogwheels that turned fast in opposite directions, it produced the optical illusion of a motionless wheel. He later read Peter Mark Roget's 1824 article Explanation of an optical deception in the appearance of the spokes of a wheel when seen through vertical apertures which addressed the same illusion. Plateau decided to investigate the phenomenon further and later published his findings in Correspondance Mathématique et Physique in 1828. In a letter to the same scientific periodical dated December 5, 1829 he presented his (still nameless) Anorthoscope, a disc that turns an anamorphic picture into a normal picture when it is spun fast and seen through the four radial slits of a counter-rotating black disc. This invention was later marketed, for instance by Newton & Co in London.

On 10 December 1830 Michael Faraday presented a paper at the Royal Institution of Great Britain called On a Peculiar Class of Optical Deceptions about the optical illusions that could be found in rotating wheels. He referred to Roget's paper and described his associated new findings. Faraday had not been aware that Plateau had already published many similar explanations for similar phenomena. After this became clear, he wrote Plateau to honour his earlier work. Some of Faraday's experiments were new to Plateau and especially the one with a fixed image produced by a turning wheel in front of the mirror inspired Plateau with the idea for new illusions. In July 1832 Plateau sent a letter to Faraday and added an experimental disc with some "anamorphoses" that produced a "completely immobile image of a little perfectly regular horse" when rotated in front of a mirror. After several attempts and many difficulties he constructed a working model of the phénakisticope in November or December 1832. Plateau published his invention in a 20 January 1833 letter to Correspondance Mathématique et Physique. He believed that if the manner of producing the illusions could be somehow modified, they could be put to other uses, "for example, in phantasmagoria".

Stampfer read about Faraday's findings in December 1832 and was inspired to do similar experiments, which soon led to his invention of what he called Stroboscopischen Scheiben oder optischen Zauberscheiben (stroboscope discs or optical magic discs). Stampfer had thought of placing the sequence of images on either a disc, a cylinder (like the later zoetrope) or, for a greater number of images, on a long, looped strip of paper or canvas stretched around two parallel rollers (much like film reels). He also suggests covering up most of the disc or the mirror with a cut-out sheet of cardboard so that one sees only one of the moving figures and painting theatrical coulisses and backdrops around the cut-out part (somewhat similar to the later Praxinoscope-Theatre). Stampfer also mentioned a version which has a disc with pictures on one end and a slotted disc on the other side of an axis, but he found spinning the disc in front of a mirror more simple. By February 1833 he had prepared six double-sided discs, which were later published by Trentsensky & Vieweg. Matthias Trentsensky and Stampfer were granted an Austrian patent (Kaiserlichen königlichen Privilegium) for the discs on 7 May 1833.

Publisher and Plateau's doctoral adviser Adolphe Quetelet claimed to have received a working model to present to Faraday as early as November 1832. Plateau mentioned in 1836 that he thought it difficult to state the exact time when he got the idea, but he believed he was first able to successfully assemble his invention in December. He stated to trust the assertion of Stampfer to have invented his version at the same time.

Peter Mark Roget claimed in 1834 to have constructed several phénakisticopes and showed them to many friends as early as in the spring of 1831, but as a consequence of more serious occupations he did not get around to publishing any account of his invention.

== Commercial production ==
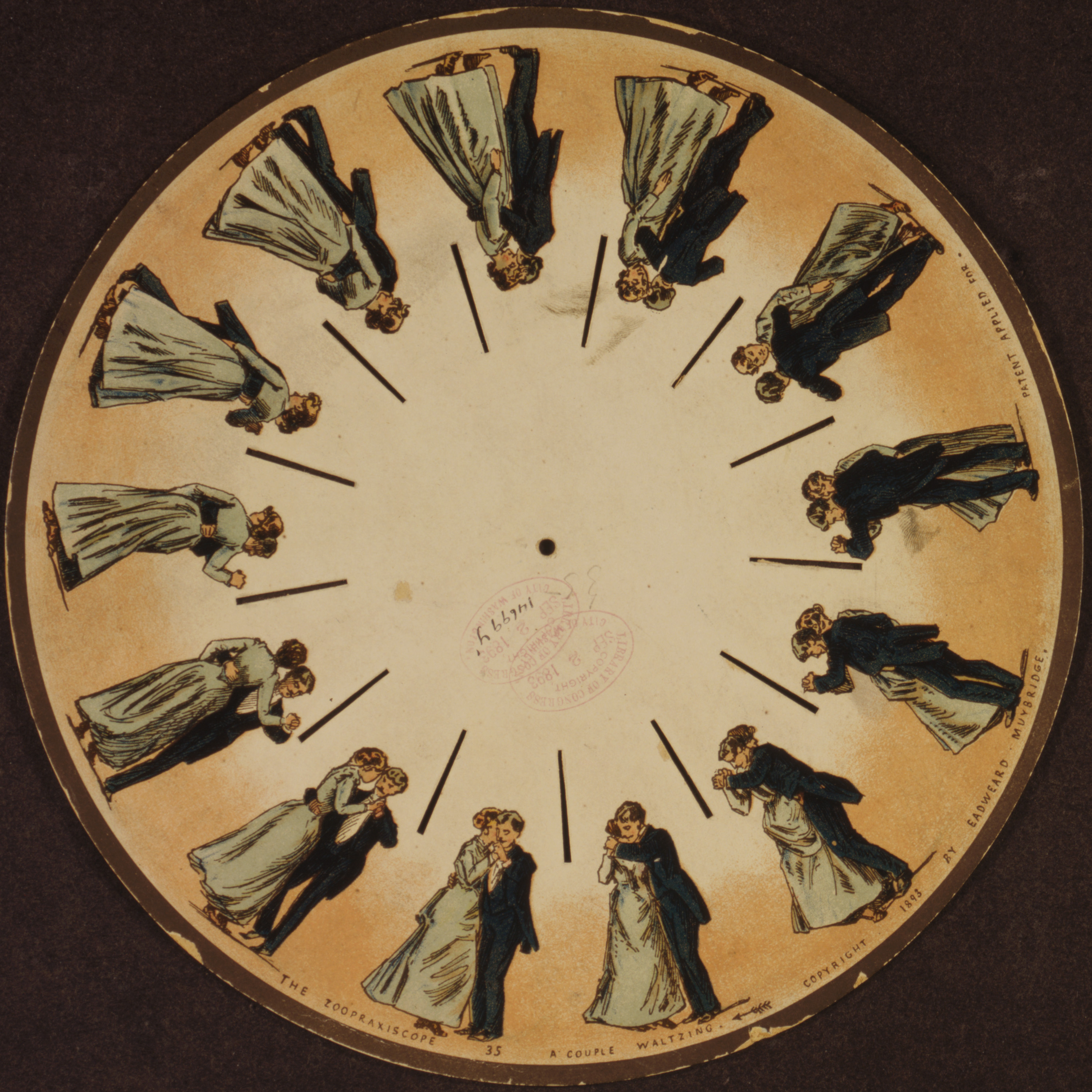
A paper zoopraxiscope disc by Eadweard Muybridge (1893)

Re-animation from that disc

Animation of a Fantascope disc by Thomas Mann Baynes, 1833

According to Mathias Trentsensky, of art dealer and publishing company Trentsensky & Vieweg, Stampfer had prepared six double-sided discs as early as February 1833 and had repeatedly demonstrated these to many friends. In April 1833 Trentsensky applied for an Austrian patent (k.k. Privilegium) together with Stampfer, which was granted on 7 May 1833. A first edition of four double-sided discs was soon published, but it sold out within four weeks and left them unable to ship orders. These discs probably had round holes as illustrated in an 1868 article and a 1922 reconstruction by William Day, but no original copies are known to still exist. Trentsensky & Vieweg published an improved and expanded set of eight double-sided discs with vertical slits in July 1833. English editions were published not much later with James Black and Joseph Myers & Co. A total of 28 different disc designs have been credited to Professor Stampfer.

Joseph Plateau never patented his invention, but he did design his own set of six discs for Ackermann & Co in London. The series was published in July 1833 as Phantasmascope. In October 1833, Ackermann & Co changed the name of the series to Fantascope and released two more sets of six discs each, one designed by Thomas Talbot Bury and one by Thomas Mann Baynes.

In the meantime some other publishers had apparently been inspired by the first edition of Professor Stampfer's Stroboscopische Scheiben: Alphonse Giroux et Compagnie applied for a French import license on 28 May 1833 for 'Le Phénakisticope' and were granted one on 5 August 1833. They had a first set of 12 single sided discs available before the end of June 1833. Before the end of December 1833 they released two more sets.

By 16 June 1833, Joh. Val. Albert published Die belebte Wunderscheibe in Frankfurt and soon marketed internationally. This version had uncut discs with pictures and a separate larger disc with round holes. The set of Die Belebte Wunderscheibe in Dick Balzer's collection shows several discs with designs that are very similar to those of Stampfer and about half of them are also very similar to those of Giroux's first set. It is unclear where these early designs (other than Stampfer's) originated, but many of them would be repeated on many discs of many other publishers. It is unlikely that much of this copying was done with any licensing between companies or artists.

Joseph Plateau and Simon Stampfer both complained around July 1833 that the designs of the discs they had seen around (besides their own) were poorly executed and they did not want to be associated with them.

The phénakisticope became very popular and soon there were very many other publishers releasing discs with numerous names, including:

- Periphanoscop – oder Optisches Zauber-theater / ou Le Spectacle Magique / or The Magical Spectacle (by R.S. Siebenmann, Arau, August 1833)
- Toover-schijf (by A. van Emden, Amsterdam, August 1833)
- Fores's Moving Panorama, or Optical Illusions (London, September 1833)
- The Phenakistiscope or Magic Disc (by Forrester & Nichol & John Dunn, September 1833)
- Motoscope, of wonderschijf (Amsterdam, September 1833)
- McLean's Optical Illusions, or, Magic Panorama (London, November 1833)
- Le Fantascope (by Dero-Becker, Belgium, December 1833)
- The Phenakisticope, or Living Picture (by W. Soffe, December 1833)
- Soffe's Phantascopic Pantomime, or Magic Illusions (December 1834)
- Wallis's Wheel of Wonders (London, December 1834)
- The Laughingatus, or Magic Circle (by G.S. Tregear, c. 1835)
- Le Phenakisticope (by Junin, Paris, 1839?)
- Das Phorolyt oder die magische Doppelscheibe (by Purkyně & Pornatzki, Breslau, 1841)
- Optische Zauber-Scheiben / Disques Magique (unknown origin, one set executed by Frederic Voigtlaender)
- Optische Belustigungen – Optical Amusements – Optic Amusements (unknown origin)
- Fantasmascope. Tooneelen in den spiegel (K. Fuhri, The Hague, 1848)
- Kinesiskop (designed by Purkyně, published by Ferdinand Durst, Prague, 1861)
- The Magic Wheel (by J. Bradburn, US, 1864)
- L'Ékonoscope (by Pellerin & Cie, France, 1868)
- Pantinoscope (with Journal des Demoiselles, France, 1868)
- Magic Circle (by G. Ingram, c. 1870)
- Tableaux Animés – Nouveau Phénakisticope (by Wattilaux, France, c. 1875)
- The Zoopraxiscope (by Eadward Muybridge, US, 1893)
- Prof. Zimmerman's Ludoscope (by Harbach & Co, Philadelphia, 1904)

After its commercial introduction by the Milton Bradley Company, the Zoetrope (patented in 1867) soon became the more popular animation device and consequently fewer phénakisticopes were produced.

== Variations ==
Many versions of the phénakisticope used smaller illustrated uncut cardboard discs that had to be placed on a larger slotted disc. A common variant had the illustrated disc on one end of a brass axis and the slotted disc on the other end; this was slightly more unwieldy but needed no mirror and was claimed to produce clearer images.

Fores offered an Exhibitor: a handle for two slotted discs with the pictures facing each other which allowed two viewers to look at the animations at the same time, without a mirror.

A few discs had a shaped edge on the cardboard to allow for the illusion of figures crawling over the edge. Ackermann & Co published three of those discs in 1833, including one by inventor Joseph Plateau.

Some versions added a wooden stand with a hand-cranked mechanism to spin the disc.

Several phénakisticope projectors with glass discs were produced and marketed since the 1850s.

Joseph Plateau created a combination of his phénakisticope and his Anorthoscope sometime between 1844 and 1849, resulting in a back-lit transparent disc with a sequence of figures that are animated when it is rotated behind a counter-rotating black disc with four illuminated slits, spinning four times as fast. Unlike the phénakisticope several persons could view the animation at the same time. This system has not been commercialised; the only known two handmade discs are in the Joseph Plateau Collection of the Ghent University. Belgian painter Jean Baptiste Madou created the first images on these discs and Plateau painted the successive parts.

In 1849 Joseph Plateau discussed the possibilities of combining the phénakisticope with the stereoscope as suggested to him by its inventor Charles Wheatstone. In 1852 Duboscq patented such a "Stéréoscope-fantascope, stéréofantscope ou Bïoscope". Of three planned variations only one was actually produced but without much success. Only one extant disc is known, which is in the Plateau collection of Ghent University.

== Projection ==
A plan for a phénakisticope projector with a transparent disc was published by Englishman T.W. Naylor in 1843 in the Mechanics' Magazine – Volume 38. His letter was illustrated with a detailed side view of the device. Naylor suggested tracing the pictures of available phenakisticopes onto glass with transparent paint and painting the rest black. Nothing else is known of Naylor or his machine.

Austrian magician Ludwig Döbler debuted projected animations with his patented version of the Phantaskop in his show on 15 January 1847, at the Josephstadt Theatre in Vienna. The spectacle was well-received with sold-out shows in several European cities during a tour that lasted until the spring of 1848, although one critic complained about the flickering quality of the stroboscopic images.

Franz von Uchatius started to develop an animation projector in 1851. Instrument maker Wenzel Prokesch made a first model for him which could only project images of a few inches in diameter. A more successful second model by Prokesch had a stationary disc with transparent pictures with a separate lens for each picture focused on the same spot on a screen. A limelight revolved rapidly behind the disc to project the sequential images one by one in succession. This model was demonstrated to the Austrian Academy of Sciences in 1853. Prokesch marketed the machine and sold one to Döbler, who used it in his shows that also included other magic lantern techniques, like dissolving views.

From around 1853 until the 1890s J. Duboscq in Paris marketed different models of a projection phénakisticope. It had a glass disc with a diameter of 34 centimeters for the pictures and a separate disc with four lenses. The discs rotated at different speeds.

An "Optical Instrument" was patented in the U.S. in 1869 by O.B. Brown, using a phenakistiscope-like disc with a technique very close to the later cinematograph; with Maltese Cross motion; a star-wheel and pin being used for intermittent motion, and a two-sector shutter.

Thomas Ross developed a small transparent phénakisticope system, called Wheel of life, which fitted inside a standard magic lantern slide. A first version, patented in 1869, had a glass disc with eight phases of a movement and a counter-rotating glass shutter disc with eight apertures. The discs depicted Ice Skaters, Fishes, Giant's Ladder, Bottle Imp and other subjects. An improved version had 13 images and a single slot shutter disc and received British Patent 2685 on 10 October 1871.

Henry Renno Heyl presented his Phasmatrope on 5 February 1870 at the Philadelphia Academy of Music. This modified magic lantern had a wheel that could hold 16 photographic slides and a shutter. The wheel was rotated in front of the light source by an intermittent mechanism to project the slides successively (probably with a speed of 3 fps). The program contained three subjects: All Right (a popular Japanese acrobat), Brother Jonathan and a waltzing couple. Brother Jonathan addressed the audience with a voice actor behind the screen and professed that "this art will rapidly develop into one of the greatest merit for instruction and enjoyment." The pictures of the waltzing couple survived and consist of four shots of costumed dancers (Heyl and a female dancing partner) that were repeated four times in the wheel. The pictures were posed. Capturing movement with "instantaneous photography" would first be established by Eadward Muybridge in 1878.

Eadward Muybridge created his Zoopraxiscope in 1879 and lectured until 1894 with this projector for glass discs on which pictures in transparent paint were derived from his chronophotographic plates.

== Scientific use ==
The phénakisticope was invented through scientific research into optical illusions and published as such, but soon the device was marketed very successfully as an entertaining novelty toy. After the novelty wore off, it was mostly seen as a toy for children. Nonetheless, some scientists still regard it as a useful demonstration tool.

The Czech physiologist Jan Purkyně used his version, called Phorolyt, in lectures since 1837. In 1861 one of the subjects he illustrated was the beating of a heart.

German physicist Johann Heinrich Jakob Müller published a set of 8 discs depicting several wave motions (waves of sound, air, water, etcetera) with J.V. Albert in Frankfurt in 1846.

The famous English pioneer of photographic motion studies Eadweard Muybridge built a phenakisticope projector for which he had his photographs rendered as contours on glass discs. The results were not always very scientific; he often edited his photographic sequences for aesthetic reasons and for the glass discs he sometimes even reworked images from multiple photographs into new combinations. An entertaining example is the sequence of a man somersaulting over a bull chased by a dog. Only one disc features photographs; a sequence of a horse skeleton with its legs positioned according to the successive phases of a running gait (thus an early application of the stop motion technique). Muybridge first called his apparatus Zoogyroscope, but soon settled on the name Zoöpraxiscope. He used it in countless lectures on human and animal locomotion between 1880 and 1895.

== 20th and 21st centuries ==
The Joseph Plateau Award, a trophy resembling a phénakisticope, was a Belgian movie award given yearly between 1985 and 2006.

Several vinyl music releases have phénakistiscope-like animations on the labels or on the vinyl itself. In 1956 Red Raven Movie Records started a series of 78 RPM 8" singles with animations to be viewed with a device with small mirrors similar to a praxinoscope to be placed on the center of the disc. Since 2010 audio-visual duo Sculpture has released several picture discs with very elaborate animations to be viewed under a stroboscope flashing exactly 25 times per second, or filmed with a video camera shooting progressively at a very high shutter speed with a frame rate of 25fps.

== Fantascope invented by Prof. Plateau published by Ackermann & Co, London ==
The original handmade designs by Joseph Plateau have been preserved in the Ghent University Museum. The first series of 6 discs was initially published as Phantasmacope designed by Prof. Plateau, but the product name was later changed to Fantascope.

First series, July 1833

First series, July 1833

First series, July 1833 (original not preserved)

First series, July 1833

First series, July 1833

First series, July 1833

Later addition, circa 1833

== Gallery ==
Prof. Stampfer's Stroboscopische Scheibe No. XVIII (Trentsensky & Vieweg) 1833

Prof. Stampfer's Stroboscopische Scheibe No. XX (Trentsensky & Vieweg) 1833

Library of Congress

Library of Congress
1833

Library of Congress
1833

Library of Congress
1833

Library of Congress
1833

Library of Congress
1833

Cooper Hewitt
1833

Library of Congress
1833

Library of Congress
1833

Cooper Hewitt
1833

Library of Congress
1833

Library of Congress
1833

Library of Congress
1833

Eadweard Muybridge The Zoopraxiscope. 1 A Horseback Somersault

Eadweard Muybridge The Zoopraxiscope. 2 Athletes Boxing

Eadweard Muybridge The Zoopraxiscope. 42 Horse Galloping

== See also ==
- Eadweard Muybridge
- Electrotachyscope
- Flip book
- History of animation
- History of film
- List of film formats
- List of multiple discoveries
- Kaleidoscope
- Optical toys
- Praxinoscope
- Precursors of film
- Strobe light
- Thaumatrope
- Zoetrope
- Zoopraxiscope
