= Chromatrope =

Type of magic lantern slide

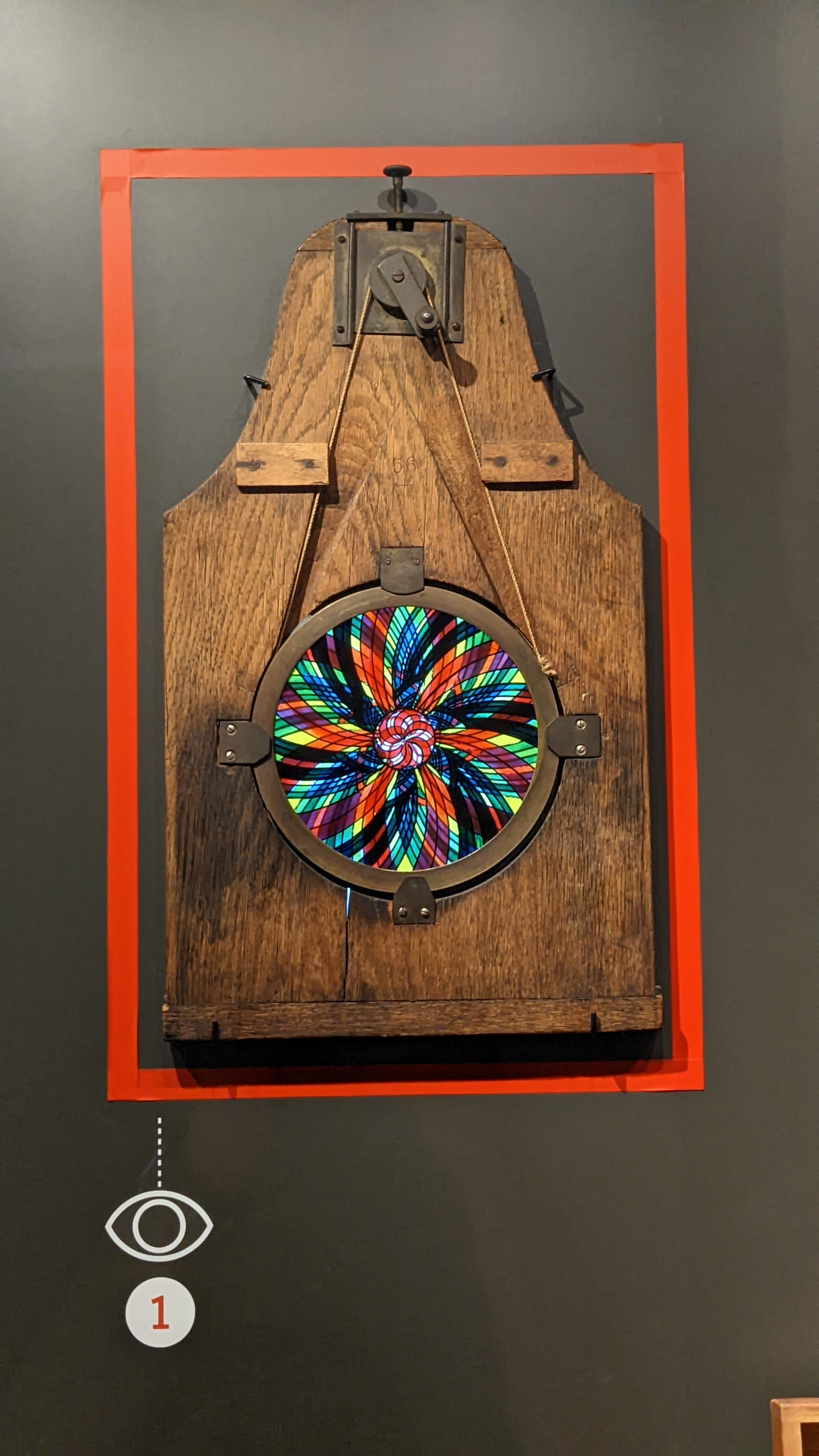
Chromatrope, double rackwork animated slide. United Kingdom, 2nd half 19th century. Museo Nazionale del Cinema, Turin.

A chromatrope is a type of magic lantern slide that produces dazzling, colorful geometrical patterns set in motion by rotating two painted glass discs in opposite directions, originally with a double pulley mechanism but later usually with a rackwork mechanism.

The chromatrope was likely invented in the year 1841 or earlier by English glass painter and showman Henry Langdon Childe, by which year it was listed in the Royal Polytechnic Institution catalogue. It was added as a novelty to the program of the Royal Polytechnic Institution, which had previously included many other types of magic lantern shows with moving images, such as phantasmagoria and dissolving views.

The principle and the effect of the chromatrope is similar to that of the feux pyriques that had gained some popularity in rich North European households at the end of the 18th century. The resulting abstract and everchanging image is also very similar to that of the kaleidoscope, which had caused an enormous international craze in 1818.
