= Alphonse Giroux =

French art restorer and ébéniste

- Born: 6 April 1776
- Died: 1 May 1848 (aged 72)

François-Simon-Alphonse Giroux (6 April 1776 – 1 May 1848) was a French art restorer and ébéniste.

== Life and work ==
He studied painting under Jacques-Louis David, and founded an art restoration business near the end of the 18th century. He was the official restorer of Notre Dame Cathedral, and collected and exhibited art by Louis Daguerre, Charles Marie Bouton, Charles Arrowsmith, Charles Renoux, and others. As well as restoring art, his business made and sold furniture in various styles for the French royal family and others.

In June 1833 Alph. Giroux & Cie. introduced the Phénakisticope in France, as one of the first companies to publish the animation device after it was more or less simultaneously invented in Belgium and Austria. The company's name for the device would end up to be the most commonly used one, soon adapted as 'phenakistiscope' in England (and later misspelled as 'phenakistoscope').

Giroux is also known for constructing the daguerreotype cameras designed by Daguerre, the first commercially manufactured photographic camera in the world. A mass-produced daugerrotype camera cabinet manufactured by Giroux, who was the brother-in-law of Louis Daguerre, was exhibited at the 1839 Exposition des produits de l'industrie française in Paris. It did not win an award, although Giroux did gain a silver medal for a jewelry box.

The painter André Giroux was one of his sons.
