= Thaumatrope =

Optical toy featuring a spinning disk with pictures on each side

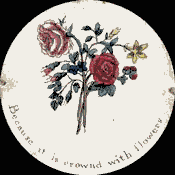
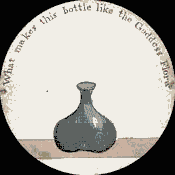
Both sides of a thaumatrope from 1825 (click for a simulation of its appearance in use)

A thaumatrope is an optical toy that was introduced in 1825. When the strings attached to the small illustrated disk are twirled quickly between the fingers, the depicted elements on either side of the disk appear to blend into one image. It was explained as the result of visual impressions lingering in the mind for about one-eighth of a second after the image has been removed.

Examples of common thaumatrope pictures include a bare tree on one side of the disk, and its leaves on the other, or a bird on one side and a cage on the other. Many classic thaumatropes also included riddles or short poems, with one line on each side.

In addition to superimposing images, its "persistence of vision" effect is a disputed explanation for the cause of illusory motion in stroboscopic animation and film. Thaumatropes can provide an illusion of motion with the two sides of the disc each depicting a different phase of the motion, but no examples are known to have been produced until long after the introduction of the first widespread animation device: the phenakistiscope.

Thaumatropes are often seen as important antecedents of motion pictures and in particular of animation.

The name translates roughly as "wonder turner", from Ancient Greek: θαῦμα "wonder" and τρόπος "turn".

== Invention ==
A 2012 paper argues that a prehistoric bone disk found in the Laugerie-Basse rockshelter is a thaumatrope, designed to be spun using leather thongs threaded through the central perforation.

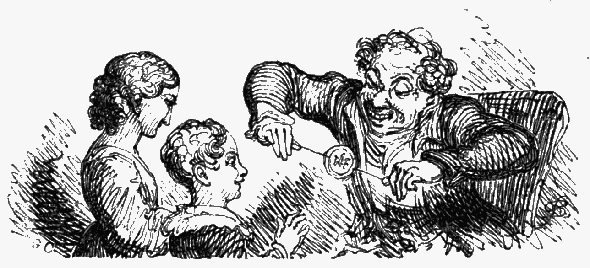
The thaumatrope was used by pulling two strings, causing them to untwist and twirl the card between them rapidly.

The invention of the thaumatrope is usually credited to British physician John Ayrton Paris. The device was described in detail in his 1827 educational book for children Philosophy in Sport made Science in Earnest, being an attempt to illustrate the first principles of natural philosophy by the aid of popular toys and sports, with an illustration by George Cruikshank. The book was published anonymously, until posthumous editions were credited to John Ayrton Paris.

British mathematician Charles Babbage recalled in 1864 that the thaumatrope was invented by the geologist William Henry Fitton. Babbage had told Fitton how the astronomer John Herschel had challenged him to show both sides of a shilling at once. Babbage held the coin in front of a mirror, but Herschel showed how both sides were visible when the coin was spun on the table. A few days later Fitton brought Babbage a new illustration of the principle, consisting of a round disc of card suspended between two pieces of sewing silk. This disc had a parrot on one side and a cage at the other side. Babbage and Fitton made several different designs and amused some friends with them for a short while. They forgot about it until some months later they heard about the "wonderful invention of Dr. Paris".

French artist Antoine Claudet stated in 1867 that he had heard that Paris had once been present when Herschel demonstrated his rotating coin trick to his children and subsequently got the idea for the thaumatrope.

Claudet also noted in 1867 that the thaumatrope could create a three-dimensional illusion. A spinning rectangular thaumatrope with the alternating letters of the name "Victoria" on each side, showed the full word with the letters at two different distances from the observer's eye. If the two strings of the thaumatrope are attached to the same side of the card the thickness of the card accounts for a small difference in the distances when each side is visible.

== Commercial production ==
A thaumatrope of a mouse and a cage

The first commercial thaumatrope was registered at Stationers' Hall on 2 April 1825 and published by W. Phillips in London as The Thaumatrope; being Rounds of Amusement or How to Please and Surprise By Turns, sold in boxes of 12 or 18 discs. It included a sheet with mottoes or riddles for each disc, often with a political meaning. Paris was widely regarded as the author, but wasn't mentioned on the product or its packaging and he later claimed in a letter to Michael Faraday "I was first induced to publish it, at the earnest desire of my late friend Wm Phillips. (...) I may add that I never put my name to it".

The steep price of a set (seven shilling for 12 discs or half a guinea for 18) was criticized, half a guinea would have been about a week's pay for an average worker. It was also defended: its inventor should be able to earn something from his invention while it was new, before it was widely copied as seen before with the kaleidoscope. Paris later claimed he gained £150,- from its sales in the United Kingdom.

As expected, pirate copies soon became common and were much cheaper. For instance the 'Thaumatropical Amusement' was available in boxes of six discs for one shilling.

Original copies are now very rare; only one extant set produced by W. Phillips is currently known (in the Richard Balzer collection) and one single disc is at the Cinématheque Française.

Other early publishers across the continent included Alphonse Giroux & Compagnie in France, and Trentsensky in Austria. In 1833, these companies would be the very first publishers of the next big "philosophical toy" craze: the Phénakisticope.

== Animation ==
In the first 1827 edition of "Philosophy in Sport", John Ayrton Paris described a version with a circular frame around the disc through which the strings were threaded. A little tug on the strings would cause a minor change in the axis of rotation and thus a slight shift in the position of the images while revolving. An adapted version of the standard horse and jockey thaumatrope could thus first show the jockey on the horse before being thrown over its head. In a new 1833 edition of the book this example was replaced with a version without a ring but with an elastic string added to change the axis by pulling it. This version showed a drinking man lowering and raising a bottle to and from his mouth, with an illustration of the different sides of the disc and the different states of the resulting image. Several other examples were described in the book. The balls of a juggler could appear as in motion and the two painted balls could be seen as three or four when the axis of rotation was shifted. A tailor in a pulpit next to a pond with a goose fluttering in the water would have the tailor falling into the water and the goose taking his place in the pulpit. No commercially produced versions with these techniques are known.

On 26 November 1869 the Rev. Richard Pilkington received "Useful Registered Design Number 5074" for his Pedemascope. This was a variation of the thaumatrope. It had a card with pictures "painted in two different positions on both sides". This card was placed in the two-part mahogany holder with a handle and a brass pin that would semi-rotate the card when it was twirled (a bit of iron preventing full rotation). Transparent or cut-out variations were suggested for use with the magic lantern.

In 1892 mechanical engineer Thomas E. Bickle received British Patent No. 20,281 for a clockwork thaumatrope with "pictures or designs exhibiting some action or motion in two phases, which are thus alternately presented to the eye in rapid succession with small intervals of rest".

== See also ==
- Strobe light
