= Anorthoscope =

Device demonstrating an optical illusion

An anorthoscope is a device that demonstrates an optical illusion that turns an anamorphic picture on a disc into a normal image by rotating it behind a counter-rotating disk with four radial slits. It was invented in 1829 by Belgian physicist Joseph Plateau, whose further studies of the principle led him to the 1832 invention of a stroboscopic animation that would become known as the phénakisticope (commonly regarded as a pinnacle in the development of cinematography, and thus as an important step in the history of modern media).

Anorthoscopes with a black background have a translucent picture and need a luminous slit revolving behind the image disc. To make them translucent, the discs were impregnated with oil on the back and varnished on both sides.

== History ==
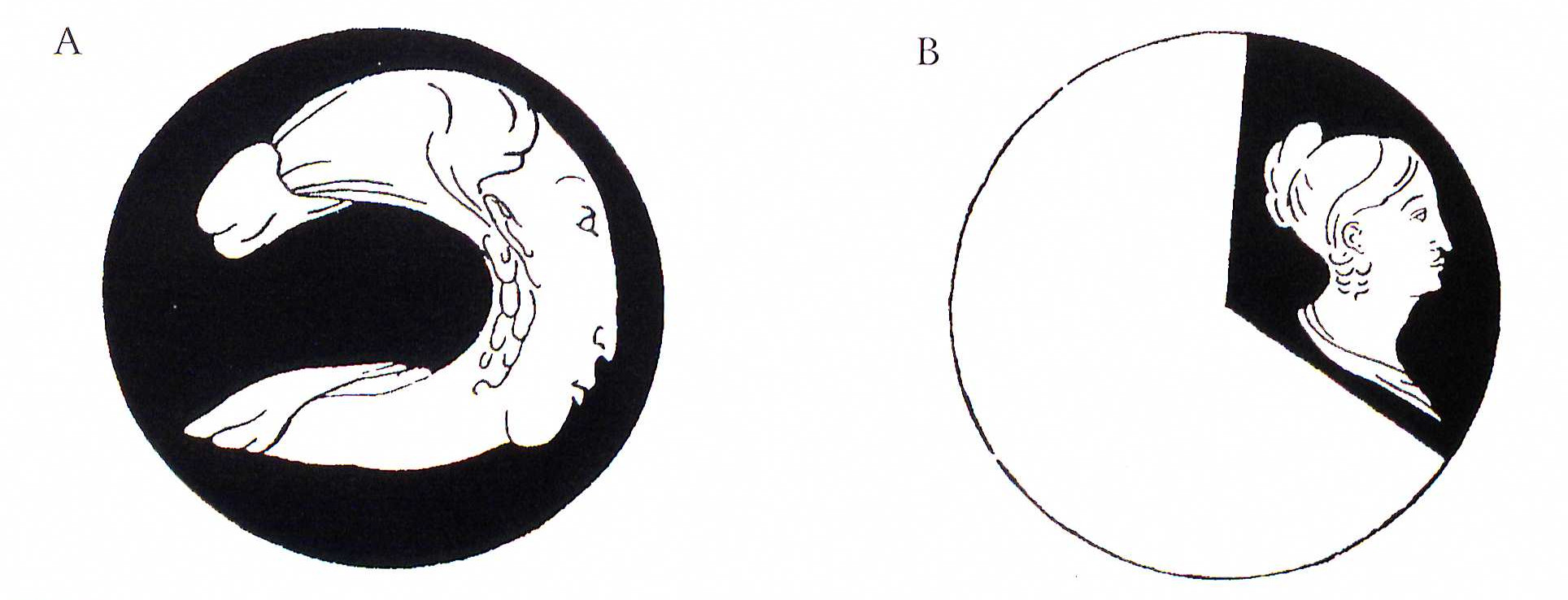
The anamorphic disc image (A) and one of the three perceived images when spun (B) as illustrated in Correspondance Mathématique et Physique - Tome VI (1830)

During early experiments for his study of physics at the University of Ghent, Plateau looked at two concentric cogwheels rotating in opposite directions, and noted how the fast moving cogs formed the shadowy image of a motionless wheel. He later read Peter Mark Roget's 1824 article Explanation of an optical deception in the appearance of the spokes of a wheel when seen through vertical apertures that addressed a similar illusion and decided to further investigate the phenomenon. Some of his findings were published in Correspondance Mathématique et Physique in 1828

On 9 June 1829, Plateau presented his (still unnamed) anorthoscope as 'a very new sort of anamorphoses' (French: une espèce toute nouvelle d'anamorphoses) in his doctoral thesis On some properties of the impressions that light produces in the organ of sight (French: Sur quelques propriétés des impressions produites par la lumière sur l'organe de la vue), at the University of Liège. It was later translated and published in the German scientific magazine Annalen der Physik und Chemie. A letter to Correspondance Mathématique et Physique dated 5 December 1829 included pictures of a disc and the resulting image as an illustration of these "new species of anamorphoses".

Plateau revisited this concept several times in the Correspondance Mathématique et Physique and by January 1836 he had arranged for the device to be released commercially. He sent a box with the instrument to Michael Faraday on 8 January 1836, since they both studied this type of optical illusions. Faraday had previously inspired Plateau to use a mirror with revolving discs, which helped Plateau to develop his Fantascope a.k.a. Phénakisticope. Faraday thought the anorthoscope was a beautiful machine with an exceedingly curious and good effect, and mentioned: "It has wonderfully surprised many to whom I have showed it and they all refuse to believe their own eyes and cannot admit that the forms seen are the things looked at".

The device was marketed starting in 1836 by publishers like Newton & Co in London, Susse in Paris (12 different discs) and J. Duboscq in Paris (at least 18 different discs).

Plateau apparently first used the name "anorthoscope" in a letter to his mentor, publisher and good friend Adolphe Quetelet, planning to send an example of the device to Miss Quetelet as a gift. Soon after, he presented it to the Royal Academy in Brussels in 1836.

Joseph Plateau created a combination of his Fantascope (or phénakisticope) and the Anorthoscope sometime between 1844 and 1849 resulting in a back-lit transparent disc with a sequence of figures that are animated when it is rotated behind a counter-rotating black disc with four illuminated slits, spinning four times as fast. Unlike the phénakisticope, several people could view the animation at the same time. This system has not been commercialized; the only known two handmade discs are in the Joseph Plateau Collection of the Ghent University. Belgian painter Jean Baptiste Madou created the first images on these discs and Plateau painted the successive parts.

== 21st century ==
A scientific paper on the effects of the anorthoscope was published in 2007.

A rare completed 1836 anorthoscope set by Susse with twelve discs was auctioned for €44,000 in 2013. The other two known extant sets of this edition are in the Werner Nekes collection and in the Joseph Plateau Collection in the Science Museum of the Ghent University.
