= Simon von Stampfer =

Austrian mathematician (1792–1864)

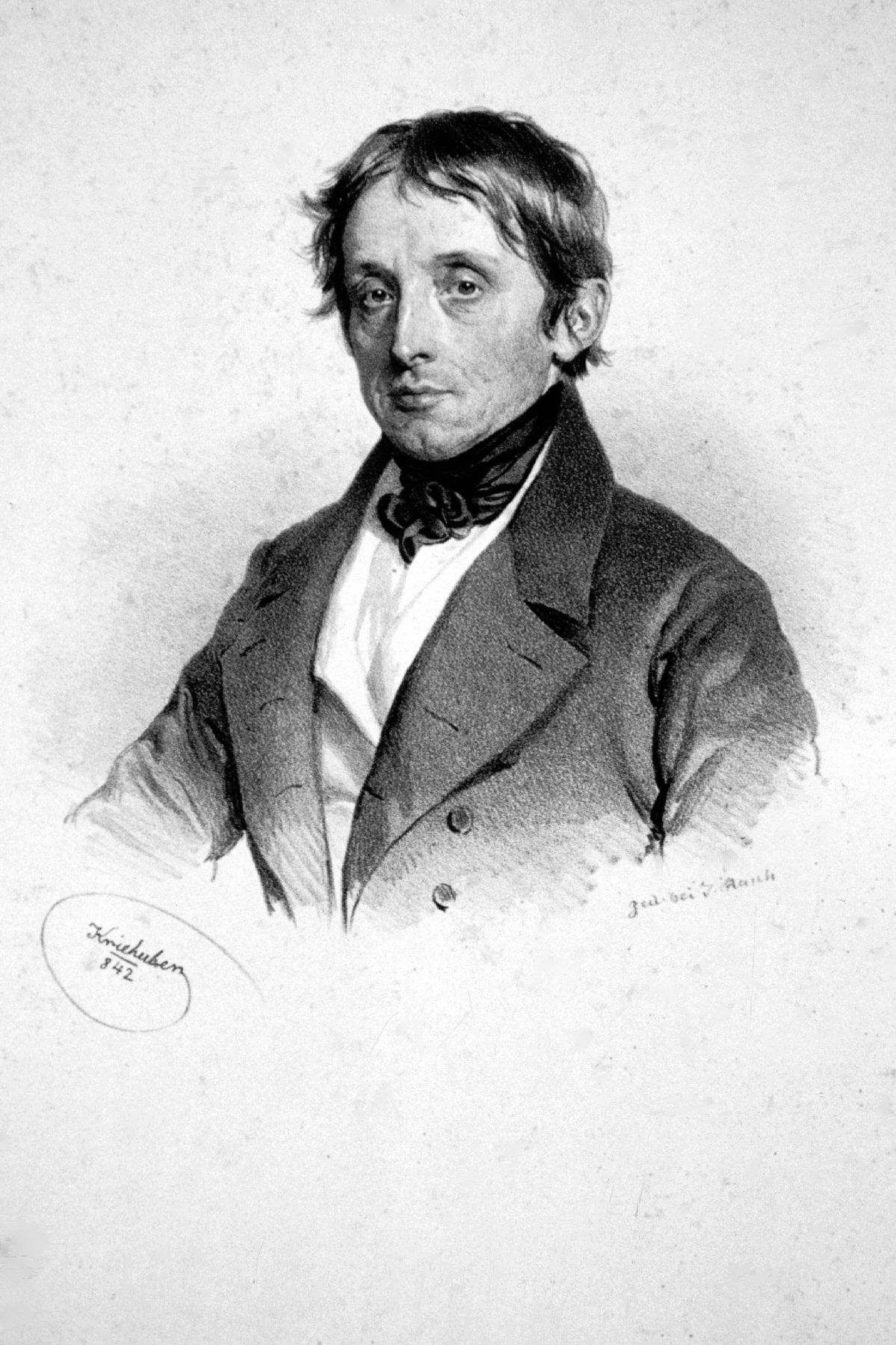
Simon Stampfer, Lithograph by Josef Kriehuber, 1842

Simon Ritter von Stampfer (26 October 1792 (according to other sources 1790)), in Windisch-Matrei, Archbishopric of Salzburg, today called Matrei in Osttirol, Tyrol – 10 November 1864 in Vienna) was an Austrian mathematician, surveyor and inventor. His most famous invention is that of the stroboscopic disk which has a claim to be the first device to show moving images. Almost simultaneously, a similar device was developed in Belgium (the phenakistiscope).

== Life ==
=== Youth and education ===
Simon Ritter von Stampfer was born in Matrei in Osttirol, and was the first son of Bartlmä Stampfer, a weaver. From 1801 he attended the local school and in 1804 and moved to the Franciscan Gymnasium in Lienz, where he studied until 1807. From there he went to the Lyceum in Salzburg, to study philosophy, however he was not assessed.

In 1814 in Munich, he passed the state examination and applied there as a teacher. He chose, however, to stay in Salzburg, where he was assistant teacher in mathematics, natural history, physics and Greek at the high school. He then moved to the Lyceum, where he taught elementary mathematics, physics and applied mathematics . In 1819 he was also appointed a professor. In his spare time he made geodetic measurements, astronomical observations, experiments on the propagation speed of sound at different heights and measurements using the barometer. Stampfer was often to be seen in the Benedictine Monastery of Kremsmünster which had numerous pieces of astronomical equipment available.

In 1822, von Stampfer married Johanna Wagner. They had a daughter in 1824 (Maria Aloysia Johanna) and in 1825 a son (Anton Josef Simon).

=== First scientific and teaching work ===
After several unsuccessful applications, in Innsbruck, Stampfer was finally promoted to full professor of pure mathematics in Salzburg. However, at the Polytechnic Institute in Vienna, he was also promoted to the Chair of Practical Geometry. He settled there in December 1825 to replace Franz Josef von Gerstner. He now taught Practical geometry, but was also employed as a physicist and astronomer. He produced a method for the computation of solar eclipses.

He was concerned about his astronomical work with lenses and their accuracy and distortion. This led him to the field of optical illusions. In 1828, he developed test methods for telescopes and methods of measurement to determine the "Krümmungshalbmesser" of lenses and the refractive and dispersion property of the glass. For his work on the theoretical foundations of the production of high quality optics, he turned to the achromatic Fraunhofer lens.

One of his most famous students include Christian Doppler, known for his work in the Doppler Effect

=== Development of "stroboscopic discs" ===
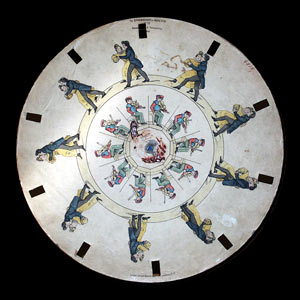
One of Stampfer's Stroboscopic Discs. c1830s

In 1832, Stampfer became aware through the Journal of Physics and Mathematics of experiments by the British physicist, Michael Faraday, on the optical illusion caused by rapidly rotating gears, in which the human eye could not follow the movement of the gear. He repeated Faraday's experiments of looking in a mirror through the openings between the teeth of slotted cardboard wheels, with "very curious effects" if figures were drawn or pasted on the disc's surface. Stampfer turned this into a method that made drawings move in any conceivable manner. He called his animation discs Stroboscopische Scheiben (optische Zauberscheiben) (Stroboscopic Discs, or optical magic discs), coining the term as a combination of the Ancient Greek words στρόβος - strobos, meaning "whirlpool" and σκοπεῖν - skopein, meaning "to look at". In a pamphlet published in July 1833, Stampfer mentioned that the sequence of images could be placed on either a disc, a cylinder (much like the Zoetrope, introduced in 1866) or longer scenes on a looped strip of paper or canvas stretched around two parallel rollers (somewhat similar to film on spools). A disc with pictures could be viewed though a slotted disc on the other side of an axis, but Stampfer found spinning one disc with slots as well as pictures in front of a mirror more simple. He also suggested covering up the view of all but one of the moving figures with a cut-out sheet of cardboard and painting theatrical coulisses and backdrops around the cut-out part (somewhat similar to the later Praxinoscope-Theatre). The patent for the invention also mentions the option of transparent versions. Stampfer and lithographer Mathias Trentsensky chose to publish the invention in the shape of a disc to be viewed in a mirror.

Belgian scientist Joseph Antoine Ferdinand Plateau had been developing a very similar device for some time and finally published about what would later be named the Fantascope or Phénakisticope in January 1833 in a Belgian scientific periodical, illustrated with a plate of the device. Plateau mentioned in 1836 that he thought it difficult to state the exact time when he got the idea, but he believed he was first able to successfully assemble his invention in December. He stated to trust the assertion of Stampfer to have started his experiments at the same time, which soon resulted in the discovery of the stroboscopic animation principle. Both Stampfer and Plateau have a claim to be the founding father of Cinema. Most cited with this honour however is Joseph Antoine Ferdinand Plateau.

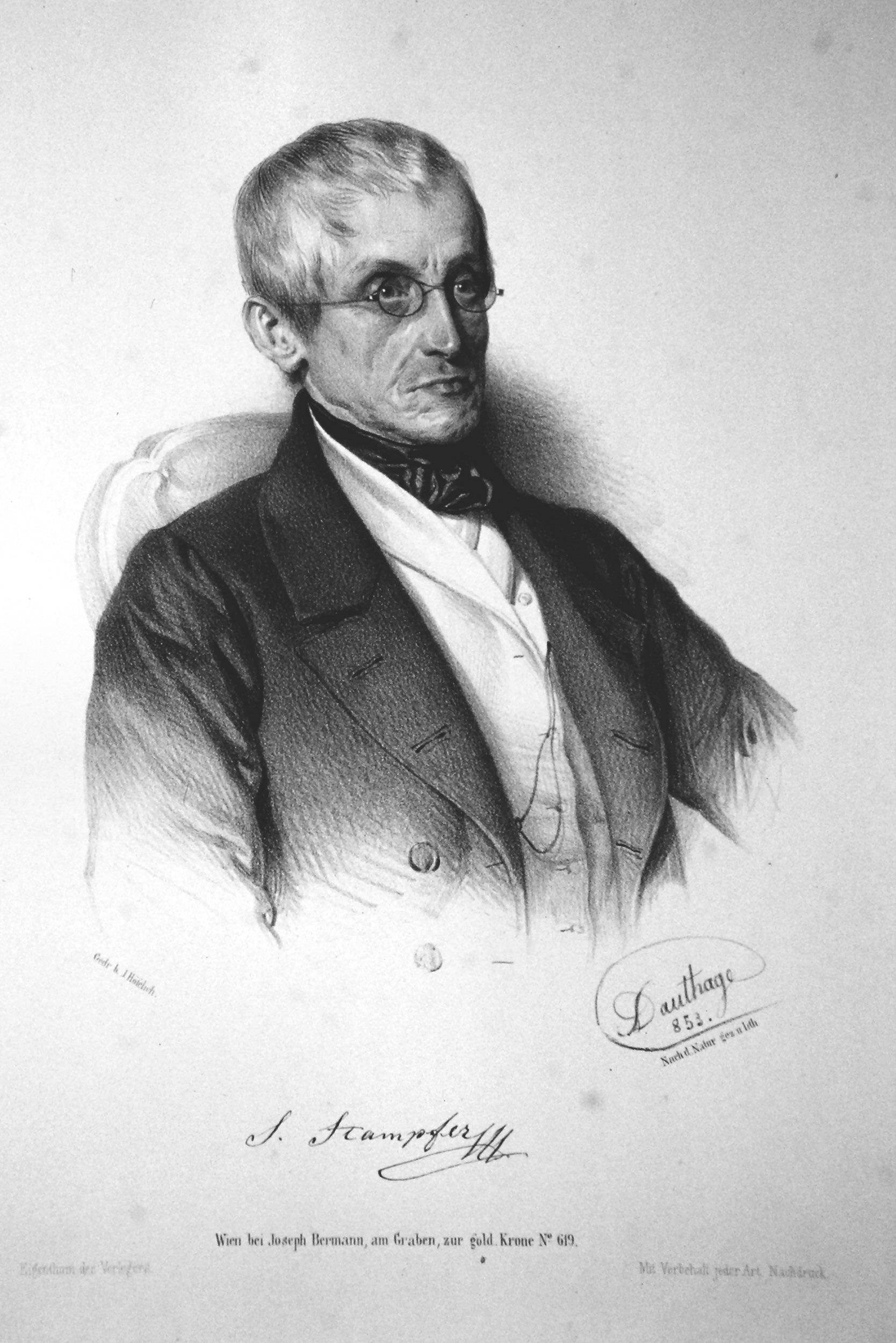
Simon Stampfer, Lithograph by Adolf Dauthage, 1853

Stampfer received the imperial privilege No. 1920 for his invention on 7 May 1833 :

The 1920th S. Stampfer, a professor at Imperial Polytechnic Institute in Vienna. (Wieden, Nro. 64), and Mathias Trentsensky; in the invention, figures and colored shapes, images ever of any kind, according to mathematical and physical laws so as to distinguish that, if the same with due speed by some mechanism before the eye passed, while the beam is constantly interrupted, the varied optical illusions in related movements and actions that represent the eye, and with these images the easiest way to slices of cardboard or any other materials zweckmässigcn are drawn to their peripheral holes are attached to Browse . When these discs, a mirror opposite, quickly turned around their axes, so evident to the eye when the holes Browse through the lively pictures in the mirror, and it can in this way not only machine movements of any kind, such as wheels and hammer works, continue rolling carts and rising balloons, but also the different kinds of actions and movements of people and animals depicted are surprising. Nor can follow the same principles by other mechanical devices themselves compound acts, such as theatrical scenes in Thätigkeit diverge workshops, etc., either through transparent as well as ordinary kind drawn pictures. In two years, from 7 May. (Jb Polytechnic. Inst Vol 19, 406f., Zit. in )

The device was developed by the Viennese art dealers Trentsensky & Vieweg and commercially marketed. The first edition was published in May 1833 and was soon sold out, so that in July a second, improved edition appeared.

His "stroboscopic discs" became known outside of Austria, and it was from this that the term "stroboscope" arose.

=== Legacy ===
- The asteroid 3440 Stampfer is named after him.
- In 2024, Austrian filmmaker Thomas Renoldner directed Stampfer Dreams, an animated short film styled after Simon von Stampfer's work.

== Sources ==
- Franz Allmer: Simon Stampfer 1790–1864. Picture a life. In: Communications of the Geodetic Institute of the Technical University of Graz, No. 82, Graz 1996
- William Formann: Austrian pioneers of cinematography. Bergland Verlag, Wien 1966, p. 10–18
- Peter Schuster, and Christian Strasser: Simon Stampfer 1790–1864. From the magic disc for the film (series of press offices, Special Publications Series No. 142), Salzburg 1998
