= Dissolving views =

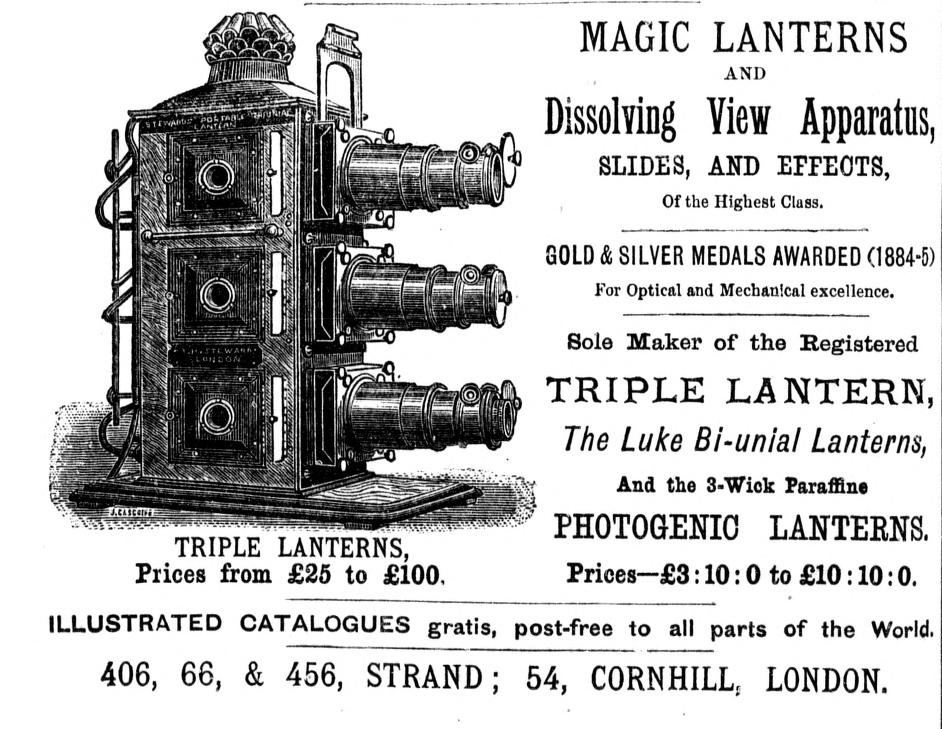
Advertisement with picture of a triple lantern / dissolving view apparatus (1886)

Dissolving views were a popular type of 19th century magic lantern show exhibiting the gradual transition from one projected image to another. The effect is where the dissolve in modern filmmaking is derived from. Typical examples had landscapes that dissolved from day to night or from summer to winter. The effect was achieved by aligning the projection of two matching images and slowly diminishing the first image while introducing the second image. The subject and the effect of magic lantern dissolving views is similar to the popular diorama theatre paintings which originated in Paris in 1822. The terms "dissolving views", "dioramic views", or simply "diorama" were often used interchangeably in 19th century magic lantern playbills.

While most dissolving views showed landscapes or architecture in different light, the effect was also used in other ways. For instance, Henry Langdon Childe showed groves changing into cathedrals. Another popular example has a soldier sleeping or daydreaming on the battlefield, with dissolving views displaying several of his dreams about home above his head.

== Invention ==
The dissolve effect was reportedly invented by phantasmagoria pioneer Paul de Philipsthal while in Ireland in 1804. He thought of using two lanterns to make the spirit of Samuel appear out of a mist in his representation of the Witch of Endor. While working out the desired effect, he got the idea of using the technique with landscapes. Information about De Philipsthal's activities after 1804 is limited, so it remains unclear whether he did incorporate the effect in his shows before other lanternists developed their own versions. Surviving playbills of his shows seem to focus on the exhibition of automata, besides "experiments in optics, aeronautics, hydraulics and pyrotechnics". Some bills do not even mention any optical effects. However, an 1812 newspaper about a London performance indicates that De Philipsthal presented "a series of landscapes (in imitation of moonlight), which insensibly change to various scenes producing a very magical effect". After a few other lanternists had presented similar shows, De Philipsthal returned from retirement in December 1827 with a show that included "various splendid views (...) transforming themselves imperceptibly (as if it were by Magic) from one form into another".

Another possible inventor is Henry Langdon Childe, who purportedly once worked for De Philipsthal. He is said to have invented the dissolving views in 1807 and to have improved and completed the technique in 1818. However, there's no documentation of Childe performing with a magic lantern before 1827. That year he presented "Scenic Views, showing the various effects of light and shade" with a series of subjects that would become classics in many dissolving view shows, while some had already been subjects in the London Diorama the years before.

In 1826 Scottish magician and ventriloquist M. Henry's introduced what he referred to as "Beautiful Dissolvent Scenes", "imperceptibly changing views", "dissolvent views" and "Magic Views" which were created "by Machinery invented by M. Henry".

The oldest known use of the term "dissolving views" occurs on playbills for Childe's shows at the Adelphi Theatre in London in 1837. Childe further popularized the dissolving views at the Royal Polytechnic Institution in the early 1840s.

== Technique and equipment ==
Biunial lanterns, with two projecting optical sets in one apparatus, were produced to more easily project dissolving views. Probably the first biunial lantern, dubbed the "Biscenascope" was made by the optician Mr. Clarke and presented at the Royal Adelaide Gallery in London on December 5, 1840. Later on triple lanterns enabled the addition of more effects, for instance the effect of snow falling while a green landscape dissolves into a snowy winter version.

A mechanical device could be fitted on the magic lantern, which locked up a diaphragm on the first slide slowly whilst a diaphragm on a second slide was opened simultaneously.

Philip Carpenter's copper-plate printing process, introduced in 1823, may have made it much easier to create duplicate slides with printed outlines that could then be colored differently to create dissolving view slides. However, all early dissolving view slides seem to have been hand-painted.
