= Ternus =

Ternus is a surname. Notable people with the surname include:

- John Ternus (born 1975), American engineer and business executive
- Marsha Ternus (born 1951), American lawyer and Iowa Supreme court justice

== See also ==
- Ternus illusion
