= Image =

Visual artifact that depicts or records perception

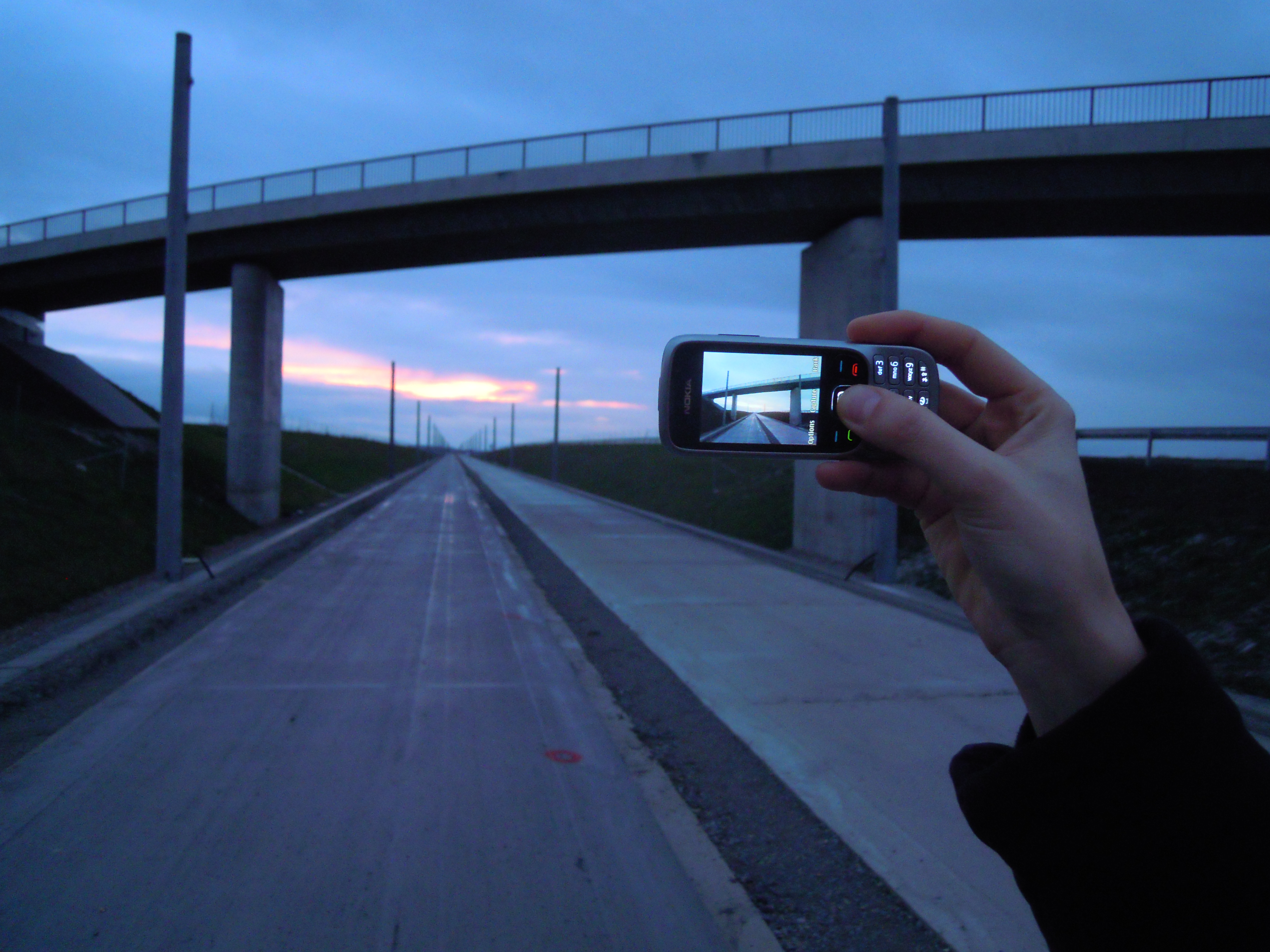
The act of making a 2D image with a mobile phone camera. The display of the phone shows the photograph that will be made and stored.

An image or picture is a visual representation. An image can be two-dimensional, such as a drawing, painting, or photograph, or three-dimensional, such as a carving or sculpture. Images may be displayed through other media, including a projection on a surface, activation of electronic signals, or digital displays; they can also be reproduced through mechanical means, such as photography, printmaking, or photocopying. Images can also be animated through digital or physical processes.

In the context of signal processing, an image is a distributed amplitude of color(s). In optics, the term image (or optical image) refers specifically to the reproduction of an object formed by light waves coming from the object.

A volatile image exists or is perceived only for a short period. This may be a reflection of an object by a mirror, a projection of a camera obscura, or a scene displayed on a cathode-ray tube. A fixed image, also called a hard copy, is one that has been recorded on a material object, such as paper or textile.

A mental image exists in an individual's mind as something one remembers or imagines. The subject of an image does not need to be real; it may be an abstract concept such as a graph or function or an imaginary entity. For a mental image to be understood outside of an individual's mind, however, there must be a way of conveying that mental image through words or visual productions of the subject.

== Characteristics ==
=== Two-dimensional images ===
The broader sense of the word 'image' also encompasses any two-dimensional figure, such as a map, graph, pie chart, painting, or banner. In this wider sense, images can also be rendered manually, such as by drawing, the art of painting, or the graphic arts (such as lithography or etching). Additionally, images can be rendered automatically through printing, computer graphics technology, or a combination of both methods.

A two-dimensional image does not need to use the entire visual system to be a visual representation. An example of this is a grayscale ("black and white") image, which uses the visual system's sensitivity to brightness across all wavelengths without taking into account different colors. A black-and-white visual representation of something is still an image, even though it does not fully use the visual system's capabilities.

On the other hand, some processes can be used to create visual representations of objects that are otherwise inaccessible to the human visual system. These include microscopy for the magnification of minute objects, telescopes that can observe objects at great distances, X-rays that can visually represent the interior structures of the human body (among other objects), magnetic resonance imaging (MRI), positron emission tomography (PET scans), and others. Such processes often rely on detecting electromagnetic radiation that occurs beyond the light spectrum visible to the human eye and converting such signals into recognizable images.

=== Three-dimensional images ===
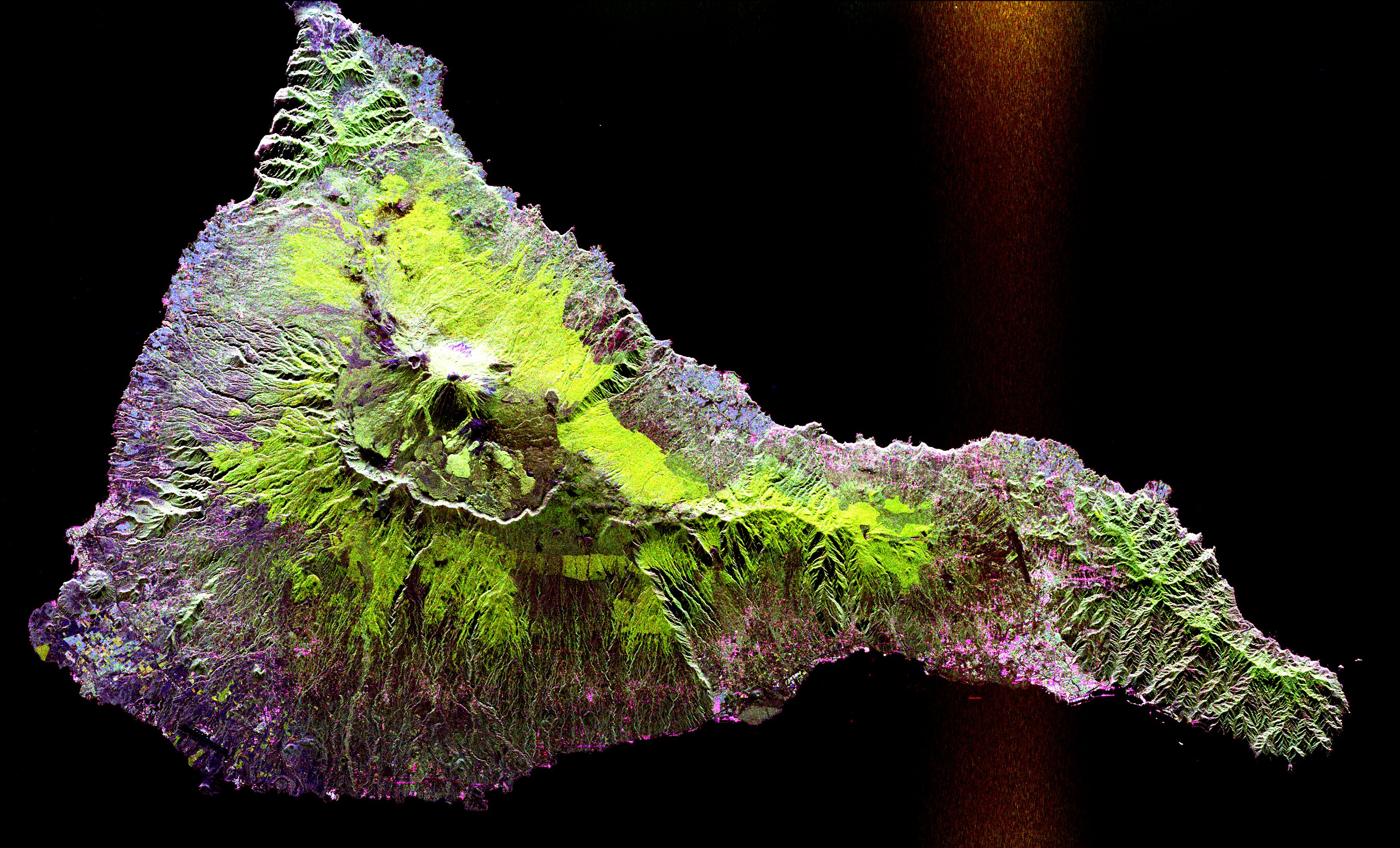
A synthetic aperture radar image acquired by the SIR-C/X-SAR radar on board the Space Shuttle Endeavour shows the Teide volcano. The city of Santa Cruz de Tenerife is visible as the purple and white area on the lower right edge of the island. Lava flows at the summit crater appear in shades of green and brown, while vegetation zones appear as areas of purple, green, and yellow on the volcano's flanks.

Aside from sculpture and other physical activities that can create three-dimensional images from solid material, some modern techniques, such as holography, can create three-dimensional images that are reproducible but intangible to human touch. Some photographic processes can now render the appearance of depth in an otherwise "flat" image, but "3D photography" (stereoscopy) or "3D film" traditionally have required special devices such as polarized eyeglasses to view the 3D effect.

=== Moving images ===
"Moving" two-dimensional images are actually illusions of movement perceived when still images are displayed in sequence, each image lasting less, and sometimes much less, than a fraction of a second. The traditional standard for the display of individual frames by a motion picture projector has been 24 frames per second (FPS) since at least the commercial introduction of "talking pictures" in the late 1920s, which necessitated a standard for synchronizing images and sounds. Even in electronic formats such as television and digital image displays, the apparent "motion" is actually the result of many individual lines giving the impression of continuous movement.

This phenomenon has often been described as "persistence of vision": a physiological effect of light impressions remaining on the retina of the eye for very brief periods. Even though the term is still sometimes used in popular discussions of movies, it is not a scientifically valid explanation. Other terms emphasize the complex cognitive operations of the brain and the human visual system. "Flicker fusion", the "phi phenomenon", and "beta movement" are among the terms that have replaced "persistence of vision", though no one term seems adequate to describe the process.

== Cultural and other uses ==
Image-making seems to have been common to virtually all human cultures since at least the Paleolithic era. Prehistoric examples of rock art—including cave paintings, petroglyphs, rock reliefs, and geoglyphs—have been found on every inhabited continent. Many of these images seem to have served various purposes: as a form of record-keeping; as an element of spiritual, religious, or magical practice; or even as a form of communication. Early writing systems, including hieroglyphics, ideographic writing, and even the Roman alphabet, owe their origins in some respects to pictorial representations.

=== Meaning and signification ===
Images of any type may convey different meanings and sensations for individual viewers, regardless of whether the image's creator intended them. An image may be taken simply as a more or less "accurate" copy of a person, place, thing, or event. It may represent an abstract concept, such as the political power of a ruler or ruling class, a practical or moral lesson, an object for spiritual or religious veneration, or an object—human or otherwise—to be desired. It may also be regarded for its purely aesthetic qualities, rarity, or monetary value. Such reactions can depend on the viewer's context. A religious image in a church may be regarded differently than the same image mounted in a museum. Some might view it simply as an object to be bought or sold. Viewers' reactions will also be guided or shaped by their education, class, race, and other contexts.

The study of emotional sensations and their relationship to any given image falls into the categories of aesthetics and the philosophy of art. While such studies inevitably deal with issues of meaning, another approach to signification was suggested by the American philosopher, logician, and semiotician Charles Sanders Peirce.

"Images" are one type of the broad category of "signs" proposed by Peirce. Although his ideas are complex and have changed over time, the three categories of signs that he distinguished stand out:

1. The "icon," which relates to an object by resemblance to some quality of the object. A painted or photographed portrait is an icon by virtue of its resemblance to the painting's or photograph's subject. A more abstract representation, such as a map or diagram, can also be an icon.
2. The "index," which relates to an object by some real connection. For example, smoke may be an index of fire, or the temperature recorded on a thermometer may be an index of a patient's illness or health.
3. The "symbol," which lacks direct resemblance or connection to an object but whose association is arbitrarily assigned by the creator or dictated by cultural and historical habit, convention, etc. The color red, for example, may connote rage, beauty, prosperity, political affiliation, or other meanings within a given culture or context; the Swedish film director Ingmar Bergman claimed that his use of the color in his 1972 film Cries and Whispers came from his personal visualization of the human soul.

A single image may exist in all three categories at the same time. The Statue of Liberty provides an example. While there have been countless two-dimensional and three-dimensional "reproductions" of the statue (i.e., "icons" themselves), the statue itself exists as

- an "icon" by virtue of its resemblance to a human woman (or, more specifically, previous representations of the Roman goddess Libertas or the female model used by the artist Frederic-Auguste Bartholdi).
- an "index" representing New York City or the United States of America in general due to its placement in New York Harbor, or with "immigration" from its proximity to the immigration center at Ellis Island.
- a "symbol" as a visualization of the abstract concept of "liberty" or "freedom" or even "opportunity" or "diversity".

=== Critiques of imagery ===
The nature of images, whether three-dimensional or two-dimensional, created for a specific purpose or only for aesthetic pleasure, has continued to provoke questions and even condemnation at different times and places. In his dialogue, The Republic, the Greek philosopher Plato described our apparent reality as a copy of a higher order of universal forms. As copies of a higher reality, the things we perceive in the world, tangible or abstract, are inevitably imperfect. Book 7 of The Republic offers Plato's "Allegory of the Cave," where ordinary human life is compared to being a prisoner in a darkened cave who believes that shadows projected onto the cave's wall comprise actual reality. Since art is itself an imitation, it is a copy of that copy and all the more imperfect. Artistic images, then, not only misdirect human reason away from understanding the higher forms of true reality, but in imitating the bad behaviors of humans in depictions of the gods, they can corrupt individuals and society.

Echoes of such criticism have persisted across time, accelerating as image-making technologies have developed and expanded immensely since the invention of the daguerreotype and other photographic processes in the mid-19th century. By the late 20th century, works like John Berger's Ways of Seeing and Susan Sontag's On Photography questioned the hidden assumptions of power, race, sex, and class encoded in even realistic images, and how those assumptions and such images may implicate the viewer in the voyeuristic position of a (usually) male viewer. The documentary film scholar Bill Nichols has also studied how apparently "objective" photographs and films still encode assumptions about their subjects.

Images perpetuated in public education, media, and popular culture have a profound impact on the formation of such mental images:

What makes them so powerful is that they circumvent the faculties of the conscious mind but, instead, directly target the subconscious and affective, thus evading direct inquiry through contemplative reasoning. By doing so such axiomatic images let us know what we shall desire (liberalism, in a snapshot: the crunchy honey-flavored cereals and the freshly-pressed orange juice in the back of a suburban one-family home) and from what we shall obstain (communism, in a snapshot: lifeless crowds of men and machinery marching towards certain perdition accompanied by the tunes of Soviet Russian songs). What makes those images so powerful is that it is only of relative minor relevance for the stabilization of such images whether they actually capture and correspond with the multiple layers of reality, or not.

— David Leupold, Image and ideology. Some thoughts on Berger's Another Way of Telling

=== Religious critiques ===
Despite, or perhaps because of, the widespread use of religious and spiritual imagery worldwide, the making of images and the depiction of gods or religious subjects has been subject to criticism, censorship, and criminal penalties. The Abrahamic religions (Judaism, Christianity, and Islam) all have had admonitions against the making of images, even though the extent of that proscription has varied with time, place, and sect or denomination of a given religion. In Judaism, one of the Ten Commandments given by God to Moses on Mount Sinai forbids the making of "any graven image, or any likeness [of any thing] that [is] in heaven above, or that [is] in the earth beneath, or that [is] in the water under earth." In Christian history, periods of iconoclasm (the destruction of images, especially those with religious meanings or connotations) have broken out from time to time, and some sects and denominations have rejected or severely limited the use of religious imagery. Islam tends to discourage religious depictions, sometimes quite rigorously, and often extends that to other forms of realistic imagery, favoring calligraphy or geometric designs instead. Depending on time and place, photographs and broadcast images in Islamic societies may be less subject to outright prohibition. In any religion, restrictions on image-making are especially targeted to avoid depictions of "false gods" in the form of idols. In recent years, militant extremist groups such as the Taliban and ISIS have destroyed centuries-old artifacts, especially those associated with other religions.

=== In culture ===
Virtually all cultures have produced images and applied different meanings or applications to them. The loss of knowledge about the context and connection of an image to its object is likely to result in different perceptions and interpretations of the image and even of the original object itself.

Through human history, one dominant form of imagery has been in relation to religion and spirituality. Such images, whether in the form of idols that are objects of worship or that represent some other spiritual state or quality, have a different status as artifacts when copies of such images sever links to the spiritual or supernatural. The German philosopher and essayist Walter Benjamin brought particular attention to this point in his 1935 essay "The Work of Art in the Age of Mechanical Reproduction."

Benjamin argues that the mechanical reproduction of images, which had accelerated through photographic processes in the previous one hundred years or so, inevitably degrades the "authenticity" or quasi-religious "aura" of the original object. One example is Leonardo da Vinci's Mona Lisa, originally painted as a portrait, but much later, with its display as an art object, it developed a "cult" value as an example of artistic beauty. Following years of various reproductions of the painting, the portrait's "cult" status has little to do with its original subject or the artistry. It has become famous for being famous, while at the same time, its recognizability has made it a subject to be copied, manipulated, satirized, or otherwise altered in forms ranging from Marcel Duchamp's L.H.O.O.Q. to Andy Warhol's multiple silk-screened reproductions of the image.

In modern times, the development of "non-fungible tokens" (NFTs) has been touted as an attempt to create "authentic" or "unique" images that have a monetary value, existing only in digital format. This assumption has been widely debated.

== Other considerations ==
The development of synthetic acoustic technologies and the creation of sound art have led to considering the possibilities of a sound-image made up of irreducible phonic substance beyond linguistic or musicological analysis.

=== Still or moving ===
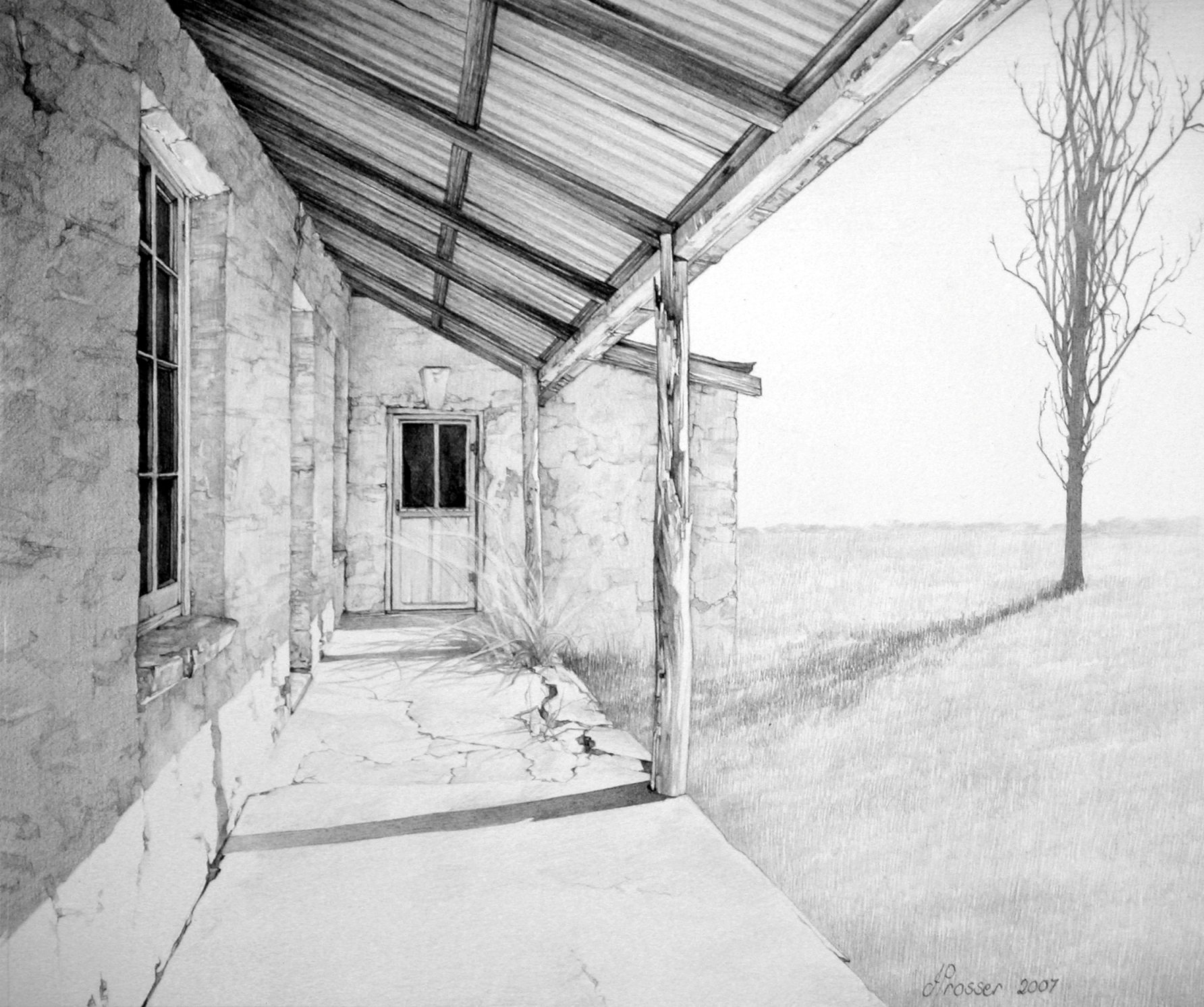
2D pencil drawing image

A still image is a single static image. This phrase is used in photography, visual media, and the computer industry to emphasize that one is not talking about movies, or in very precise or pedantic technical writing such as a standard.

A moving image is typically a movie (film) or video, including digital video. It could also be an animated display, such as a zoetrope.

A still frame is a still image derived from one frame of a moving one. In contrast, a film still is a photograph taken on the set of a movie or television program during production, used for promotional purposes.

In image processing, a picture function is a mathematical representation of a two-dimensional image as a function of two spatial variables. The function f(x,y) describes the intensity of the point at coordinates (x,y).

=== Literature ===
In literature, a "mental image" may be developed through words and phrases to which the senses respond. It involves picturing an image mentally, also called imagining, hence imagery. It can both be figurative and literal.

== See also ==
- Cinematography
- Computer-generated imagery
- Digital image
- Drawing
- Fine-art photography
- Graphics
- Image editing
- Imaging
- Painting
- Photograph
- Pictorial script
- Satellite image
- Visual arts
