= Ternus illusion =

Illusion of apparent movement

Figure 1 – element motion in effect

Figure 2 – group motion in effect

The Ternus illusion or Ternus effect is an illusion related to human visual perception involving apparent motion. In a simplified explanation of one form of the illusion, two discs, (referred to here as L for left and C for centre) are shown side by side as the first frame in a sequence of three frames. Next a blank frame is presented for a very short, variable duration. In the final frame, two similar discs (C for centre and R for right) are then shown in a shifted position. Depending on various factors including the time intervals between frames as well as spacing and layout, observers perceive either element motion, in which L appears to move to R while C remains stationary or they report experiencing group motion, in which L and C appear to move together to C and R. Both element motion and group motion can be observed in animated examples to the right in Figures 1 and 2.

== Overview ==
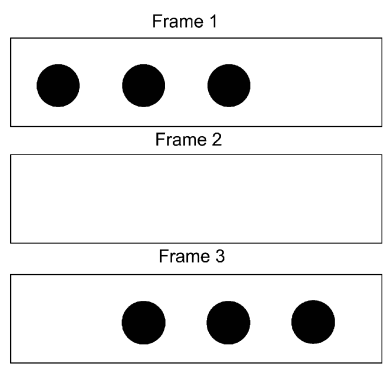
Figure 3 – frames of a Ternus motion display – as shown in Dodd (2005)

In 1926 and then again in 1938, the Gestalt psychologist Joseph Ternus observed and defined the "problem of phenomenal identity". Ternus' research was based around earlier undertakings in the domain by Pikler in 1917. This problem of phenomenal identity that Ternus had discovered occurs due to the human visual system's natural ability to establish and then preserve the entities of objects even when the defining attributes of those objects have undergone drastic changes and no longer resemble what they once did. The effect that Ternus had observed was in fact a bistable percept or perception of apparent motion which he found using a display consisting of three frames presented sequentially.

When observers are presented with two immobile stimuli, that are presented in a sequential fashion at two differing locations, the stimuli will often be perceived as a solitary object that is simply moving from a starting location to another position. This apparent motion or apparent movement is of great interest to researchers because the perceived movement does not derive strictly from the physical aspect of vision such as the stimulation caused by impingement on the retina. Instead, apparent motion appears to arise from the visual system's processing of the physical properties of the percept. It is for this reason that apparent motion is a key area of research in the domain of vision research. The Ternus illusion is perhaps one of the best examples of such an effect.

In order to observe the Ternus illusion/effect, observers view an apparent motion display known as a Ternus display. The Ternus display features a series of frames that are separated by what is known as a blank interstimulus interval (ISI). A standard Ternus display consists of three frames, sequentially presented to the observer. As can be seen in Figure 3, Frame 1 consists of three equally spread out discs that are laid out in a horizontal fashion. Frame 2 is the blank ISI which separates Frame 1 and 3 for a variable duration. Frame 3, is simply the reverse of Frame 1 with the discs on the right hand side instead. This means that the disc on the outside of Frame 1 will now appear to be in the location that the centre disc was originally in as part of Frame 1.

When these three frames are quickly presented in a sequential manner, individuals report perceiving two discrete types of motion from observing the Ternus display. These different perceptions are dependent on the duration of the ISI. Numerous studies have demonstrated that short ISIs cause the observer to perceive the central elements as immobile with one outside element jumping across those elements, known as element motion. These studies also support the finding that longer ISIs create the perception that the elements are all moving as one from left to right, known as group motion and that these percepts are not capable of occurring simultaneously. Research suggests that these variations in apparent motion are achieved by grouping the visual elements in such a way that there is an intertwining of the perception of motion and the perception of the objects identity.

At intermediate ISIs, perceived motion is bistable, meaning that for the observer the perceptual experience interchanges between element motion and group motion in a spontaneous manner. While the bistability is present, observers are still capable of judging which percept leaves more of a lasting impression. As aforementioned the two percepts are never experienced simultaneously. This occurs due to intermediate ISIs yielding different percentages of group movement and element movement that are each dependent upon their exact values.

== Element motion ==
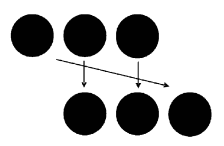
Figure 4 – element motion

Element motion can be observed when ISI’s are presented for less than 50 milliseconds. Though the most common time frame used to achieve this illusion is usually around 20 milliseconds. Element motion is characterized as the outer disc in the Ternus display being seen as "jumping over" the other two discs in the display, which are then considered to be the (inner) discs; placing itself in the right hand side location. This effect can be seen in motion in the example at the top of the page in Figure 1.

According to Braddick from his research in 1980, element motion can be attributed to the low-level short range motion process, signalling a null or no-movement for the two elements in the middle of the display between Frame 1 and Frame 3 when short ISIs are shown. As a response to this the higher level long-range motion process passes a signal of element movement. This means that the outer element appears to jump across to the opposite side of the display and back again.

== Group motion ==
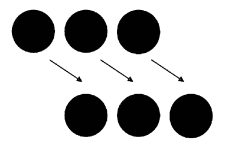
Figure 5 – group motion

When the ISI (Frame 2) in the Ternus motion display is shown for the relatively long interval of at least 50 milliseconds, group motion can be observed. The longer the inter-frame interval or ISI the more likely a group motion effect is to occur.

Group motion gives the perceiver the illusion that all of the discs within the display are moving simultaneously to the right and then back again. As with element motion this effect can be seen in Figure 3 as well as demonstrated in Figure 2. Braddick in 1980 posited that the occurrence of group motion at longer ISIs can be attributed to the short-range motion process signalling motion in the central elements of the motion display, which in turn leads to the long-range process to signal that the three elements are moving in unison.

== Factors ==
Since the discovery of the Ternus illusion there has been an abundance of research into how and why it occurs. As can be deemed from research above, one of the most critical factors appears to be the length of the ISI, as it seems to be a heavy determinant in which percept becomes apparent to the observer however there are many other factors implicated. A reasonable amount of the research in this area appears to be well empirically supported, such as the idea that lower level (short range processes) and higher level (long range processes) are involved in determining which illusion is perceived.

A study by Scott-Samuel & Hess found that the perception of element motion is influenced by changes in the spatial appearance within the Ternus display which suggests that apparent motion is mediated entirely by a long-range motion process. Research undertaken by Kramer and Yantis in 1997 found that perceptual grouping of the elements also appears to have important implications. Kramer and his colleagues found an increase in observers perceiving group motion when the elements in the display seemed to form a logical group in contrast to when they were independently arranged.

Yantis found that the perceived continuity of a briefly interrupted element in perception depends on early neural mechanisms in the visual system such as visible persistence as well as on a representation of a three-dimensional surface layout.

As previously mentioned, studies have alluded to the idea that high level motion mechanisms determine the final decision in which percept shows through, however recent research by He & Ooi suggests that this final decision is also influenced by accounting for numerous grouping factors such as proximity, similarity and common surface amongst the elements in the scene.

Though there are many ideas relating to causative factors, even current research seems to be lacking in a conclusive explanation for why the Ternus effect occurs and has not yet discovered exactly which mechanisms are responsible. Petersik and his team in 2006 suggested that intensive brain-imaging research on each percept is the way forward and is the most likely way to discover the answer. On the other hand, Grossberg and Rudd (1992, Psychol. Rev., 99, 78–121) have developed a neural model of motion perception that simulates many examples of long-range apparent motion, including both the Ternus and reverse-contrast Ternus illusions.

== See also ==
- Beta movement
- Stroboscopic effect
- Apparent motion
- Persistence of vision
- Gestalt psychology
