= Apparent motion =

Apparent motion may refer to:

== Astronomy ==
- Aberration of light, an apparent shift in position of celestial objects due to the finite speed of light and the motion of Earth in its orbit around the Sun
- Diurnal motion, the apparent motion of objects in the sky due to the Earth's rotation on its axis
- Parallax, the apparent motion of objects due to the changing angle of observation of an observer on Earth revolving around the Sun

== Perceptual illusions ==
- Beta movement, an illusion of movement where two or more still images are combined by the brain into surmised motion
- Illusory motion, the appearance of movement in a static image
- Phi phenomenon, an illusion of movement created when two or more adjacent lights blink on and off in succession
- Stroboscopic effect, a phenomenon that occurs when continuous motion is represented by a series of short or instantaneous samples
  - Wagon-wheel effect, temporal aliasing effect in which a spoked wheel appears to rotate differently from its true rotation

== Other uses ==
- Optical flow, a term used in computer science for the apparent motion of objects in a scene caused by the relative motion between an observer and the scene
- The motion of objects observed from a non-inertial reference frame
