= Induced movement =

Optical illusion

Induced movement or induced motion is an illusion of visual perception in which a stationary or a moving object appears to move or to move differently because of other moving objects nearby in the visual field. It is interpreted in terms of the change in the location of an object due to the movement in the space around it. The object affected by the illusion is called the target, and the other moving objects are called the background or the context (Duncker, 1929).

== Induced movement with stationary target ==
A stationary object appears to move in the opposite direction to the background. For example, the moon on a cloudy, windy night appears to be racing through the sky opposite to the direction of the clouds, though the moon is essentially stationary in the sky and only appears to be moving due to the movement of the clouds. For an illustration, see § External links.

== Induced movement with a moving target ==
A moving object appears to be moving faster when it is moving in the opposite direction to the background; it appears to be moving slower when it is moving in the same direction as the background.

== History of induced movement ==
Induced motion has more continuous history than does apparent motion. Induced movement was reported by Ptolemy (ca. 90 – ca. 168 AD) (see Smith, 1996). It was researched extensively by Duncker (1929).

== See also ==
- Autokinetic effect
- Illusory motion
- Motion aftereffect
- Motion induced blindness
- Motion perception
