= Interstimulus interval =

The interstimulus interval (often abbreviated as ISI) is the temporal interval between the offset of one stimulus to the onset of another. For instance, Max Wertheimer did experiments with two stationary, flashing lights that at some interstimulus intervals appeared to the subject as moving instead of stationary. In these experiments, the interstimulus interval is simply the time between the two flashes. The ISI plays a large role in the phi phenomenon (Wertheimer) since the illusion of motion is directly due to the length of the interval between stimuli. When the ISI is shorter, for example between two flashing lines alternating back and forth, we perceive the change in stimuli to be movement. Wertheimer discovered that the space between the two lines is filled in by our brains and that the faster the lines alternate, the more likely we are to perceive it as one line moving back and forth. When the stimuli move fast enough, this creates the illusion of a moving picture like a movie or cartoon. Phi phenomenon is very similar to beta movement.

As it applies to classical conditioning, the term interstimulus interval is used to represent the gap of time between the start of the neutral or conditioned stimulus and the start of the unconditioned stimulus. An example would be the case of Pavlov's dog, where the time between the unconditioned stimulus, the food, and the conditioned stimulus, the bell, is considered the ISI. More particularly, ISI is often used in eyeblink conditioning (a widely studied type of classical conditioning involving puffs of air blown into the subject's eyes) where the ISI can affect learning based on the size of the time gap. What is of interest in this particular type of classical conditioning is that when the subject is conditioned to blink after the conditioned stimulus (tone), the blink will take place within the time period between the tone and the air puff, making the subject's eyes close before the puff can reach the eyes, protecting them from the air.

The timing between the conditioned and unconditioned stimulus is important. There are two types of approaches for eye blink conditioning when it comes to timing between the stimuli. The first is called delay conditioning, which is when the conditioned stimulus (tone) starts, then continues until the unconditioned stimulus (air puff) is released after a delay, then they both suspend at the same time. The other is called trace conditioning, where the conditioned stimulus (tone) is shorter and stops before the unconditioned stimulus (air puff) begins, leaving a gap between the two stimuli. This type of conditioning forces the subject, in this particular example, a bunny, to remember to link the conditioned stimulus with the unconditioned stimulus.

The distinction between the two types of conditioning is of importance because the difference in the interstimulus interval (ISI) can have major effects on learning. For example, it has been shown that the length of the ISI, as well as the variability, changes habituation in subjects. When ISI is short and constant, habituation will happen more rapidly. The changes in the gap of time can be minuscule, from tens of milliseconds to several seconds long, and the effects it will have will still be important. Sensory and motor tasks are among the elements that can be enhanced or hindered based on timing, like speech processing, which can be influenced by "the ability to discriminate the interval and duration of sounds."
