= Samuel Renshaw =

American educational psychologist and researcher

Samuel Renshaw (1892–1981) was an American psychologist and researcher whose work became famous for a short period of time during World War II when he taught sailors to identify enemy aircraft in a split second, using tachistoscopic training. He generally worked with fast-reading and enhancing the latent ability of the mind. He believed that most people used only one-fifth of their available mind-power to process information. By using methods of flashing pages he produced students who could read as fast as 1,200 to 1,400 words per minute.

Renshaw became involved in the establishment of the Midwestern Psychological Association and served as the organization's Secretary-Treasurer in 1929. For his contributions to the war effort the United States Navy awarded him the Navy Distinguished Public Service Award in 1955. He wrote 23 volumes of a journal Visual Psychology.

Science fiction writer Robert A. Heinlein depicted the technique in several of his works, including the novel Citizen of the Galaxy (1957) and the novella Gulf (1949); he mentioned Renshaw in the context of the training of Fair Witnesses in his novel Stranger in a Strange Land (1961), a bestseller. He cited a Saturday Evening Post article on Renshaw's studies for responses to fan mail about the subject.

This technique and equipment appeared at the Ravenswood School District (near Stanford University) for a short time in the 1960s. Several young students took part in the experiment, which involved film-strip readers and page-at-a-glance equipment.

The "Renshaw Training System for Aircraft and Ship Recognition" is considered to have "saved untold lives during World War II".

== Bibliography ==
Renshaw, S. (1945), "The visual perception and reproduction of forms by tachistoscopic methods", Journal of Psychology: Interdisciplinary and Applied, 20 (2): 217–232, doi:10.1080/00223980.1945.9917254
