= Gustav Adolf Wohlgemuth =

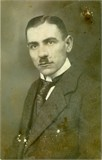
- Gustav Wohlgemuth
- Born: Gustav Adolf Wohlgemuth; 1 November 1868; Berlin, North German Confederation
- Died: 2 March 1942 (aged 73)
- Education: University College London; Psychological Laboratory (DSc)
- Known for: Motion aftereffect Critical assessment of psychoanalysis
- Scientific career
- Workplaces: Psychological Laboratory
- Thesis: (1909)

Gustav Adolf Wohlgemuth (1 November 1868 – 2 March 1942), known as A. Wohlgemuth in his publications, was a German/British businessman who lived in England and made significant contributions to psychology, conducting research into visual perception, memory, and imagery.

== Biography ==
Wolgemuth was born on 1 November 1868, in Berlin, North German Confederation, the son of Eduard Albert Maximilian Wohlgemuth and Louise Berend. According to Wade, Thompson and Morgan (2014), he travelled to London some time before 1891. Although little is known of Wohlgemuth's early life, once in London he became a British citizen in 1897 and by 1903 had established a business importing and exporting sausage casings. Despite running his business, in 1902 Wohlgemuth enrolled for a degree course in psychology at University College London, graduating with a third-class science degree in 1905. He then enrolled for a DSc in the Psychological Laboratory, supervised by William McDougall, completing his thesis in 1909 and being awarded a degree the following year.

Wade et al. (2014) reported that Wohlgemuth remained at the Psychological Laboratory after 1909, although he never became a member of its staff. He also ran his business until the end of his life.

Wohlgemuth married Clemence Morrelet in 1913 but "the union was neither fruitful nor happy" (p. 233). Wohlgemuth formed a close friendship with a fellow research student, Nellie Carey, but "On 6 June 1918 Adolf was shot in the back by his jealous wife". (p. 233) According to Valentine (2008), it proved impossible for the bullet to be removed. After Wohlgemuth had recovered from his wounds, Morrelet was tried in September 1918, was convicted for unlawful wounding, and was sentenced to six months imprisonment. Carey took Wohlgemuth's name; they had a daughter, Joan, in 1921 and a son, Bryan, in 1929. Wohlgemuth and Carey married in 1936, after the death of Morrelet.

Wohlgemuth died on 2 March 1942.

== Contributions to psychology ==
During studies for his DSc, Wohlgemuth was described as "a brilliant research student" (p. 233). His 1911 paper "On the after-effect of seen movement", based on his thesis, has been described as "the most comprehensive single article on the phenomenon [of the motion aftereffect]" (p. 229). Wohlgemuth then worked on memory and imagery, corresponding with Bertrand Russell.

In 1923 Wohlgemuth published A critical examination of psycho-analysis and it is claimed that he "is perhaps best known for his critical assessment of the scientific basis for psychoanalysis" (p. 232).

== Selected works ==
- Wohlgemuth, A. (1911). On the after-effect of seen movement. British Journal of Psychology: Monograph Supplement, 1, 1–117.
- Wohlgemuth, A. (1913). On memory and the direction of associations. British Journal of Psychology, 5, 447–465.
- Wohlgemuth, A. (1915). Simultaneous and successive association. British Journal of Psychology, 7, 434–452.
- Wohlgemuth, A. (1916). On the feelings and their neural correlate, with an examination of the nature of pain. British Journal of Psychology, 8, 423–476.
- Wohlgemuth, A. (1919). Pleasure–unpleasure. An experimental investigation of the feeling-elements. British Journal of Psychology, Monograph Supplement, 2, 1–252.
- Wohlgemuth, A. (1923). A critical examination of psycho-analysis. London: Allen & Unwin.
