= NeuroTracker =

Ppappa

NeuroTracker is a cognitive training system developed by Canadian scientist Jocelyn Faubert. It has been used for sports, military, and ADHD treatment, among other purposes.
