= Akiyoshi Kitaoka =

Japanese psychologist

Akiyoshi Kitaoka (北岡 明佳, Kitaoka Akiyoshi; born August 19, 1961) is a professor of psychology at the College of Letters, Ritsumeikan University, Kyoto, Japan, who has been referred to as "a master of optical art".

In 1984, he received a BSc from the Department of Biology, University of Tsukuba, Tsukuba, Japan, where he studied animal psychology (burrowing behavior in rats) and (at the Tokyo Metropolitan Institute for Neuroscience) neuronal activity of the inferotemporal cortex in macaque monkeys. After his 1991 PhD from the Institute of Psychology, University of Tsukuba, he specialized in visual perception and visual illusions of geometrical shape, brightness, color, in motion illusions and other visual phenomena like Gestalt completion and perceptual transparency, based on a modern conception of Gestalt psychology.

The authors of a review of the last 25 years of motion psychophysics wrote:

At about the same time that the Pinna illusion was published, Akiyoshi Kitaoka started to produce seemingly unending variants of images that contain illusory motion. Perhaps the most famous of these, entitled "Rotating snakes", involves several components, as, perhaps, all good illusions do...

An optical illusion similar to Rotating snakes

The Rotating Snakes peripheral drift illusion has been widely circulated, as have many of his other images. Backus and Oruc wrote that Kitaoka created these images by a kind of "evolutionary process": "Patterns that gave rise to the maximum illusory motion were selected, and new patterns were made by varying them in an iterative cycle."

In 2008, his designs were the inspiration for the experimental pop band Animal Collective's critically acclaimed album Merriweather Post Pavilion, which features a leaf-covered optical illusion.

He was asked by Jeff Koons to provide illusions for the interior packaging of Lady Gaga's 2013 album Artpop, and a version of his "Hatpin urchin" image appears on the CD itself.

== Awards ==
In 2006, he received the Gold Prize of the 9th L'ORÉAL Art and Science of Color contest.

In 2007, he received the Award for Original Studies from the Japanese Society of Cognitive Psychology.
