= Jocelyn Faubert =

Canadian neuroscientist (born 1959)

- Born: 1959 (age 66–67)
- Education: Concordia University
- Known for: Neurophysics, Visual Perception
- Scientific career
- Fields: Psychophysics, Neuroscience
- Workplaces: University of Montreal

Jocelyn Faubert (born 1959) is a Canadian psychophysicist best known for his work in the fields of visual perception, vision of the elderly, and neuropsychology. Faubert holds the NSERC-Essilor Industrial Research Chair in Visual Perception and Presbyopia. He is the director of the Laboratory of Psychophysics and Visual Perception at the University of Montreal. Faubert has also been involved in the transfer of research and developments from the laboratory into the commercial domain. He is a co-founder and member of the Board of Directors of CogniSens Inc.

Faubert obtained his M.Sc. and Ph.D. from Concordia University in Montreal, Quebec. Faubert's early work was related to aging, vision, and glaucoma. More recently, his work has focused on neuroplasticity as it relates to visual perception and cognitive performance.

== Research ==
Faubert oversees the work of a team of researchers and post-doctoral fellows in his multidisciplinary psychophysical and visual perception laboratory. Research areas include Brain Function, Perception, Multi-sensory integration, Neurolobiological Alterations (Autism, aging, mTBI, Stroke), Neurological systems, Biophonics, Nanophotonics and Optics. Over 130 peer-reviewed articles have resulted from the research conducted at the laboratory, as well as several patents.

=== Technologies ===
The laboratory makes use of several suites of technology to conduct its research:

- EON Icube : A Multi-sided immersive environment in which participants are completely surrounded by virtual imagery and 3D sound.
- CAVE :The Cave Automatic Virtual Environment is an advanced display system of the size of a room. It combines stereoscopic projection and high-resolution 3D computer graphics to create the illusion of being present in a virtual environment.
- EEG: the recording of electrical activity along the scalp produced by the firing of neurons within the brain. EEG refers to the recording of the brain's spontaneous electrical activity over a short period of time as recorded from multiple electrodes placed on the scalp.
- Driving Simulator: An immersive 180° field-of-view screen with simulated rear and side-view mirrors. Used extensively in research into the driving capacity of the elderly.

=== Laboratory research populations ===
The laboratory utilises its 3D technologies and diagnostic equipment to investigate perceptual cognitive issues in various populations: adults, the elderly, children, autistics and those suffering from mild Traumatic Brain Injury (mTBI).

== Scientific research ==
Faubert and colleagues were able to pinpoint the effect of normal aging on visual and perceptual functions. One important study demonstrated that it is not the physical tools of vision which are affected by aging. Rather, it is a loss of computational or processing ability of the brain that ultimately affects visual perception as people age.

Faubert and colleagues examined the impact of developmental disorders (autism, fragile x syndrome, etc.) on visual function. They were able to demonstrate that in the case of autism (unlike fragile x), patients' results are not pathway-specific, but rather are dependent on the complexity of the neural processing required to perceive the image. Over the course of their studies, Faubert and colleagues observed autism patients who could significantly outperform the general population at certain visual tasks, and patients who could significantly underperform the general population at the same tasks.

The laboratory engages in research concerning illusions in order to investigate perceptual function. For example, the peripheral drift illusion illustrates that temporal differences in luminance processing produce a signal that tricks the motion system.

Mild Perceptual Impairment (MPI) is a term that covers the deficits in complex perception that accompany reduced cognitive ability in the elderly, those affected by Autism, and also those individuals suffering from mild Traumatic Brain Injury (mTBI). Faubert's recent research has covered the detection of these deficits through detecting distinct "perceptual signatures" as well as through simulated optic flow in a virtual environment, assessing postural reactivity to determine cognitive-perceptual levels.

== Awards and honors ==
Faubert has seven distinct patents registered worldwide. He has acted as a referee for more than 17 peer-reviewed academic journals. He has been a guest lecturer including the Joe Brunei Award lecture in recognition for outstanding contributions in Ophthalmic Optics in 2009.

=== Patents ===
Faubert has been engaged in transferring technology from the academic world to the biomedical industry. This has led to seven distinct patents (3 delivered, 4 pending) all of which are licensed to spin-off companies.

Between 2007 and 2009, Faubert and colleagues patented a series of technologies designed to aid in the assessment and intervention of early neurobiological alterations (NBA) such as concussions, dementia, developmental disorders (e.g. autism, fragile X) etc. In 2010, a spin-off company licensed these technologies with a variety of medical and athletic purposes.

In 1999, Faubert, along with Vasile Diaconu, patented "On-line Spectroreflectometry Oxygenation Measurement in the Eye" (O.S.O.M.E). This development allows doctors to measure a patient's blood oxygen level non-invasively. The device instead is able to check the color of the retinal artery at the back of the eye and render a precise measurement in a matter of seconds. This technology and 2 other related technologies are licensed to a spin-off company that is fabricating new generation retinal cameras for ophthalmologists and optometrists.

== Technology transfer ==
Faubert and the Visual Perception and Psychophysics Laboratory have been involved in transferring laboratory developments into the commercial domain since 1999. Several funding agencies have been involved in brokering this technology transfer. From the commercial domain, Essilor (an ophthalmic lens company) has partnered with the Natural Sciences and Engineering Research Council of Canada (NSERC). Together, their aim has been to explore the connection between aging, visual perception, and posture. Faubert has been a chairholder at the NSERC since 2003, at which time his laboratory received a five-year grant (renewed in 2008).

In a separate commercial venture, Faubert's Laboratory has partnered with Univalor (a technology transfer specialist), CogniSens Inc. (a biomedical technology company) and Cognisens Athletics Inc., licensing four technologies related to visual perception and brain function. The aim of this partnership is to commercialize Faubert's research in the medical and team sports markets. Applications include concussion detection (NeuroMinder C3) and perceptual-cognitive training (NeuroTracker).
