= Illusory motion =

Optical illusion in which a static image appears to be moving

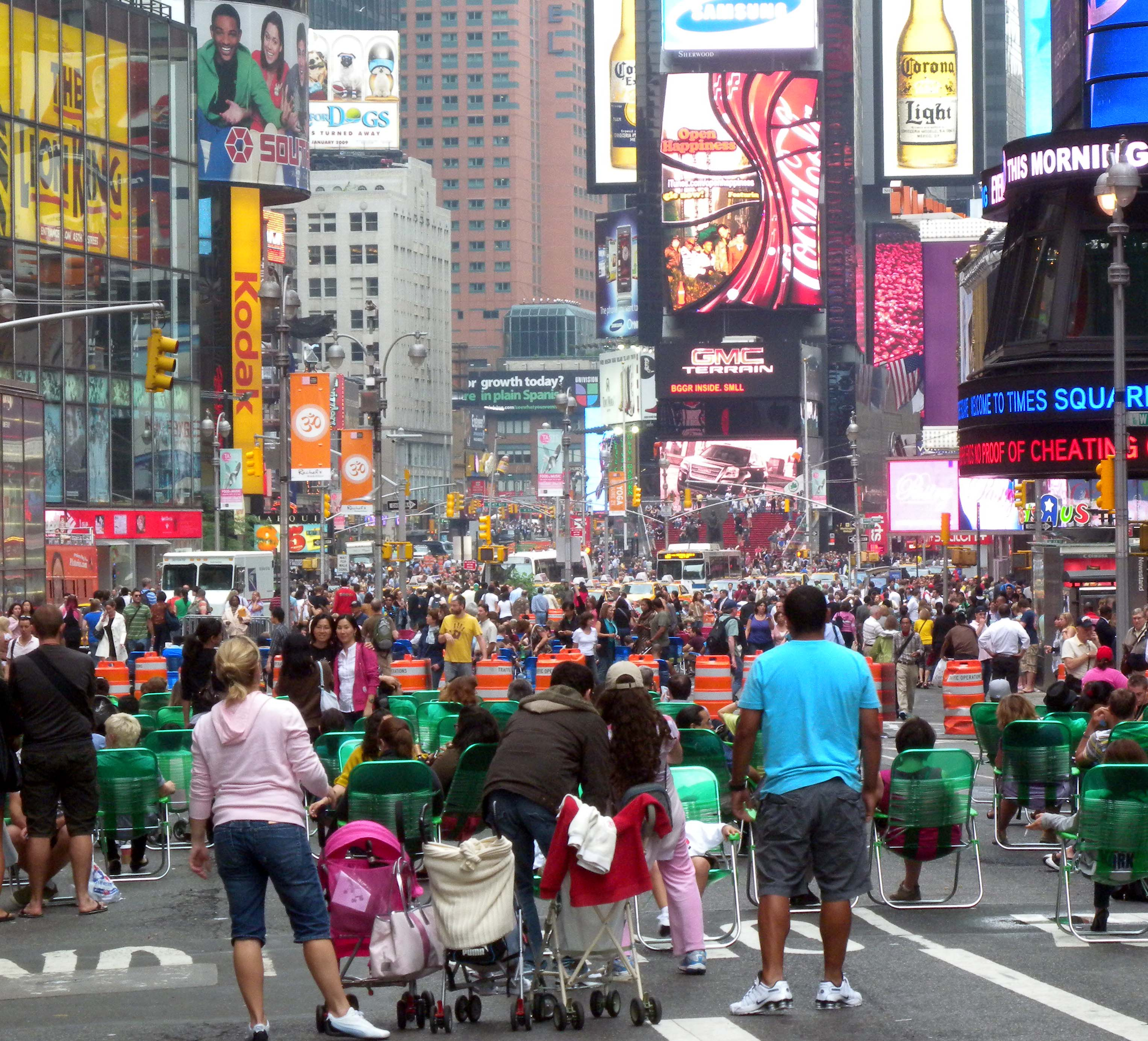
Billboards and other electronic signs use apparent motion to simulate moving text by flashing lights on and off as if the text is moving.

The term illusory motion, or motion illusion or apparent motion, refers to any optical illusion in which a static image appears to be moving due to the cognitive effects of interacting color contrasts, object shapes, and position. The stroboscopic animation effect is the most common type of illusory motion and is perceived when images are displayed in fast succession, as occurs in movies. The concept of illusory motion was allegedly first described by Aristotle.

== Types of illusory motion ==
Induced movement works by moving the background around a fixed object. Films such as Airplane! and Top Secret! use a fixed prop and move the background props to give the effect of induced motion.

Motion aftereffect occurs when one views moving stimuli for an extended period of time and then focus on a stationary object. The object will appear to move in the opposite direction of the moving stimuli.

=== Mechanics of illusory motion perception ===
Illusory motion is perceived as movement in a number of ways. The first can manifest through the retinal image where the motion flows across the retinal mosaic. The perceived motion can also manifest by the eyes changing position. In either case, an aftereffect may occur. Peripheral drift illusion is another variety of perceived movement in the eye.

Using an fMRI, Roger B. H. Tootell et al. were able to identify the area of the brain that is active when experiencing illusory motion. Tootell and his colleagues had participants view a set of concentric rings that would appear to move inward and outward. Participants would experience a motion aftereffect following the viewing the moving stimuli for 40 seconds. Participants showed an increased activity in the MT area of the brain.

== Occurrences ==
Illusory motion can occur in different circumstances. Stroboscopic images is where a series of static images are viewed in sequence at a high enough rate that the static images appear to blend into a continuous motion. An example of this is a motion picture. Optical art (or Op art.) is when artists use simple black and white patterns that create vivid illusions of motion, which are known as optical flow.

=== Stroboscopic effects ===
Stroboscopic effects are caused by aliasing that occurs when continuous rotational or other cyclic motion is represented by a series of short or instantaneous samples (as opposed to a continuous view) at a sampling rate close to the period of the motion. Rotating objects can appear counter-rotating, stationary, or rotating under a strobe light.

Simon Stampfer, who coined the term in his 1833 patent application for his stroboscopische Scheiben (better known as the "phenakistiscope"), explained how the illusion of motion occurs when during unnoticed regular and very short interruptions of light, one figure gets replaced by a similar figure in a slightly different position.

Beta movement and the phi phenomenon are examples of apparent motion that can be induced with stroboscopic alternation between stimuli at different spots in close proximity of each other. Beta movement occurs with relatively big differences in position or shape between images at relatively low stroboscopic frequencies, and seems to rely more on cerebral interpretation than on lower neural processing. The (pure) phi phenomenon occurs at very high stroboscopic frequencies and induces a ghost-like "objectless" motion between or around the alternating figures. Both have erroneously been regarded as explanations for the illusion of motion in film.

The apparent counter-rotation of wheels can also occur in constant daylight. It has been assumed that the eye views the world in a series of still images, and therefore the counter-rotation would be a result of physiological under-sampling. However, a simple demonstration to disprove the idea is to view an apparent counter-rotation (that of a rotating drum) simultaneously with a mirror image. Subjective reports reveal that the counter-rotation appears in only one of the images (either the real or mirrored image when both are viewed simultaneously). Perceptual rivalry has been suggested as a more likely cause of the effect.

=== Optical art ===
Apparent motion in optical art has been suggested to be caused by the difference in neural signals between black and white parts of an image. While white parts may produce an "on-off" signal, the black parts produce an "off-on" signal. This means for a black part and a white part presented simultaneously, the "on" part of the signal is separated in time, possibly resulting in the stimulation of motion detectors.

Another explanation is that afterimages from the retina cause a moiré that is hard to identify.

== Gallery ==

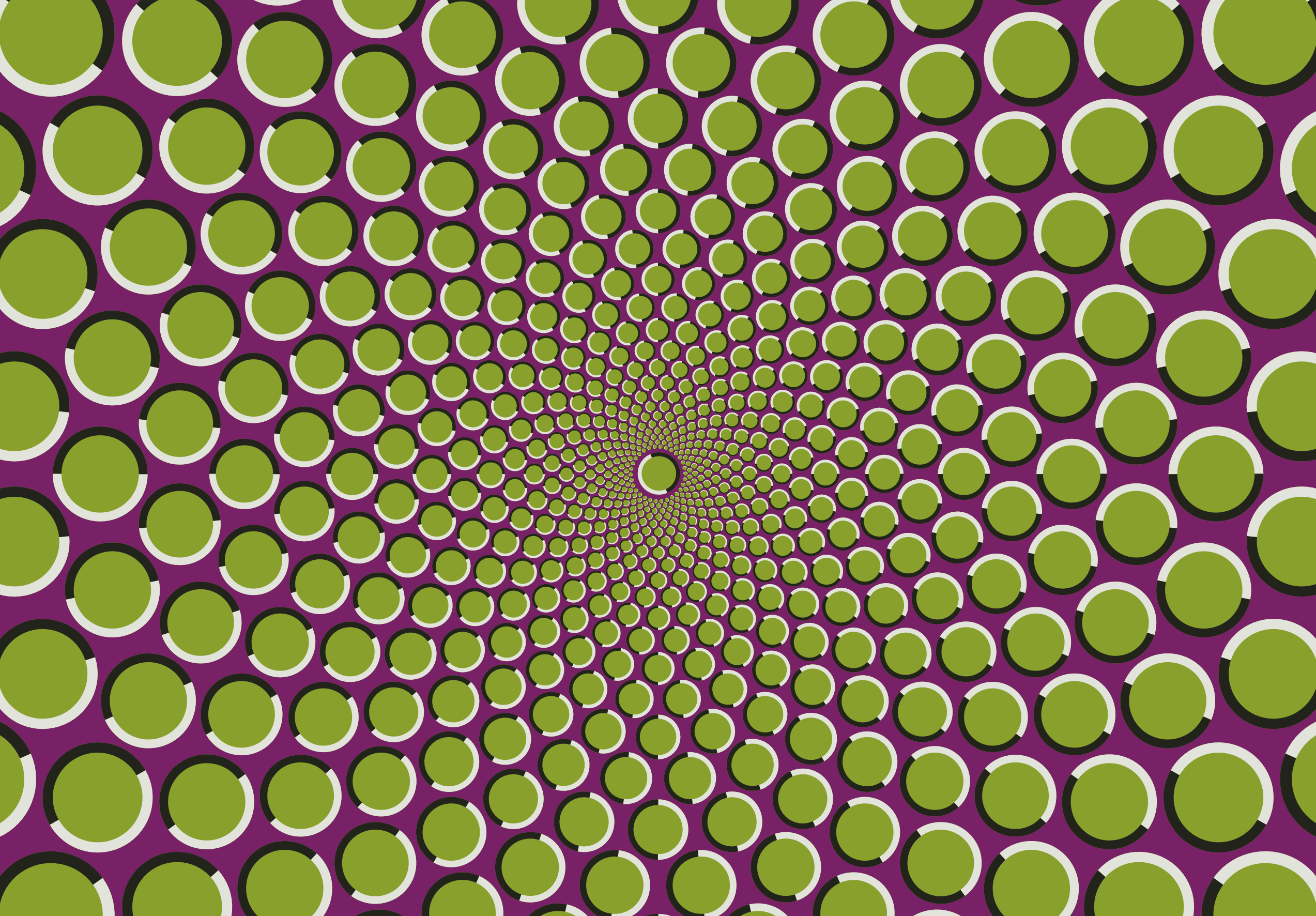

== In popular culture ==
American neo-psychedelia outfit Animal Collective used an illusory motion on the cover of their award-winning 2009 album Merriweather Post Pavilion.

The Rotating Snakes illusion by Akiyoshi Kitaoka is one of the most popularly known illusory motions.

== See also ==
- Akiyoshi Kitaoka
- Illusions of self-motion
- Induced movement
