= Werner E. Reichardt =

German physicist and biologist (1924–1992)

Werner Ernst Reichardt
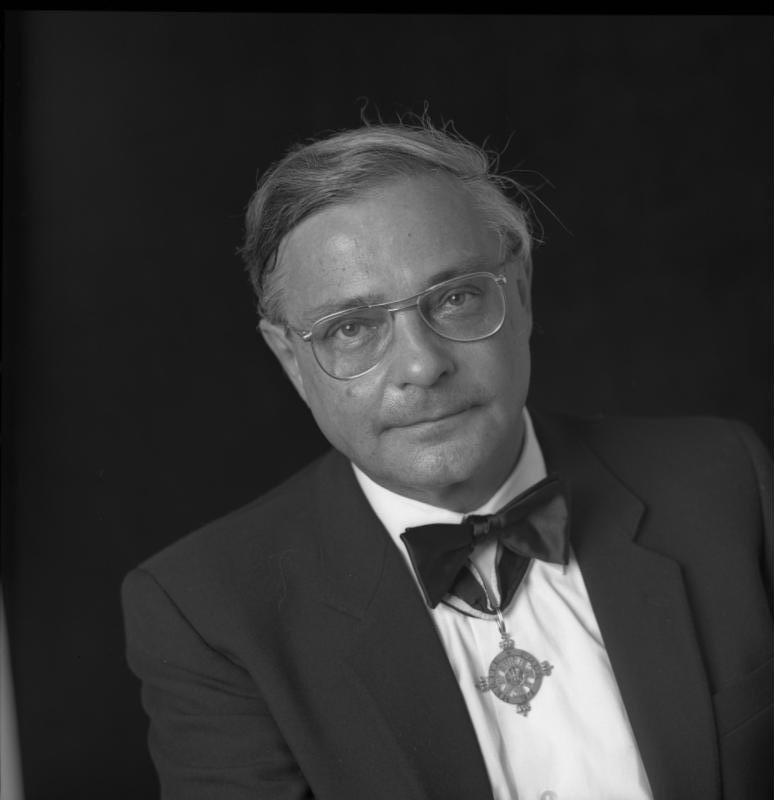
- Werner Reichardt, 1982
- Born: 30 January 1924; Berlin, Germany
- Died: 18 September 1992 (aged 68); Tübingen, Germany
- Education: Technische Universität Berlin; Fritz Haber Institute
- Known for: Reichardt detectors
- Scientific career
- Fields: Cybernetics, physics, biology
- Workplaces: California Institute of Technology; Max Planck Institute for Biophysical Chemistry; Max Planck Institute for Biological Cybernetics
- Doctoral advisor: Ernst Ruska
- Other academic advisors: Max von Laue; Max Delbrück; Karl Friedrich Bonhoeffer
- Doctoral students: Hermann Wagner
- Other notable students: Tomaso Poggio (postdoc)

Werner E. Reichardt (30 January 1924 – 18 September 1992) was a German physicist and biologist who helped to establish the field of biological cybernetics. He co-founded the Max Planck Institute for Biological Cybernetics, and the Journal of Biological Cybernetics.

== Life ==
As a young student, Werner Reichardt was a pupil in the laboratory of Hans Erich Hollmann, a pioneer of ultra-shortwave communication. Because of his knowledge he was drafted in 1941 to the German air force as a radio technician.There he met members of the resistance and established a covert radio connection with the Western Allies. In 1944 Reichardt was arrested by the Gestapo and sentenced to death, but escaped, and hid in Berlin until the end of the war.

From 1946 to 1950 he studied physics at Technische Universität Berlin. From 1950 he was a doctoral student of Ernst Ruska, studying solid state semiconductors at the Fritz-Haber-Institut of the Max-Planck-Gesellschaft, and received his doctorate in 1952. From 1952 to 1954 he was an assistant at the Institute where his teacher Max von Laue was a large influence to his later research. During the war, Reichardt had known Bernhard Hassenstein, who had studied optomotor turning behaviour after the war. Realising these experiments could be formalised in a similar way to electronics experiments, he developed interdisciplinary theories of motion perception. In 1954, Reichardt became a Postdoctoral Fellow at the California Institute of Technology at the invitation of Max Delbrück. From 1955 he was assistant at the Max Planck Institute for Biophysical Chemistry in Göttingen under Karl Friedrich Bonhoeffer. In 1958 he founded together with Bernhard Hassenstein and Hans Wenking the cybernetics research group at the Max-Planck-Institute of Biology in Tübingen. In 1968 the department was transformed into the independent Max Planck Institute for Biological Cybernetics.

Reichardt died at the age of 68 years after collapsing at the end of a symposium organised in his honour.

== Work ==
Reichardt's findings have contributed to understanding of information processing in nervous systems. From joint work (with Bernhard Hassenstein and Hans Wenking) on the visual system of insects and its effect on the flight orientation, the correlation model developed the idea that the visual system of man could be similarly investigated, and led to a general theory of motion perception

=== Reichardt detectors ===
In the 1950s, Reichardt and Hassenstein proposed a model explaining how a neuron, receiving input from photoreceptors that respond exclusively to changes in luminance, could be used to compute motion. Each photoreceptor detects changes in luminance at a specific location in visual space. By comparing the phase shifts of activity in adjacent cells, the model suggests the direction of movement can be determined as it passes from one neuron's receptive field to another. This concept, known as the Reichardt detector, has experimental evidence supporting its hypothesized behavior, although the exact the exact circuitry for this process has yet to be identified.

In honor of Reichardt's pioneering work, the Tübingen cluster of excellence Werner Reichardt Centre for Integrative Neuroscience (CIN; founded 2007/2008) was named after him.

== Honors and awards ==
- 1965: Honorary Professor of the University of Tübingen
- 1970: full member of the Academy of Sciences and Literature Mainz
- 1971: full member of the German Academy of Sciences Leopoldina Hall
- 1972: foreign member of the American Academy of Arts and Sciences Cambridge (Massachusetts)
- 1978: foreign member of the Koninklijke Nederlandse Akademie van Wetenschappen, Amsterdam
- 1980: Pour le Mérite for Sciences and Arts,
- 1984: Senator of the Max Planck Society
- 1985: HP Heineken Prize for Biochemistry and Biophysics (together with Bela Julesz)
- 1988: foreign member of the National Academy of Sciences, Washington, D.C.
- 1989: foreign member of the American Philosophical Society Philadelphia
- 1989: Member of the Academia Europaea
- 1989: honorary doctorate of the RWTH Aachen
