= Tachistoscope =

Device to display an image for a given time

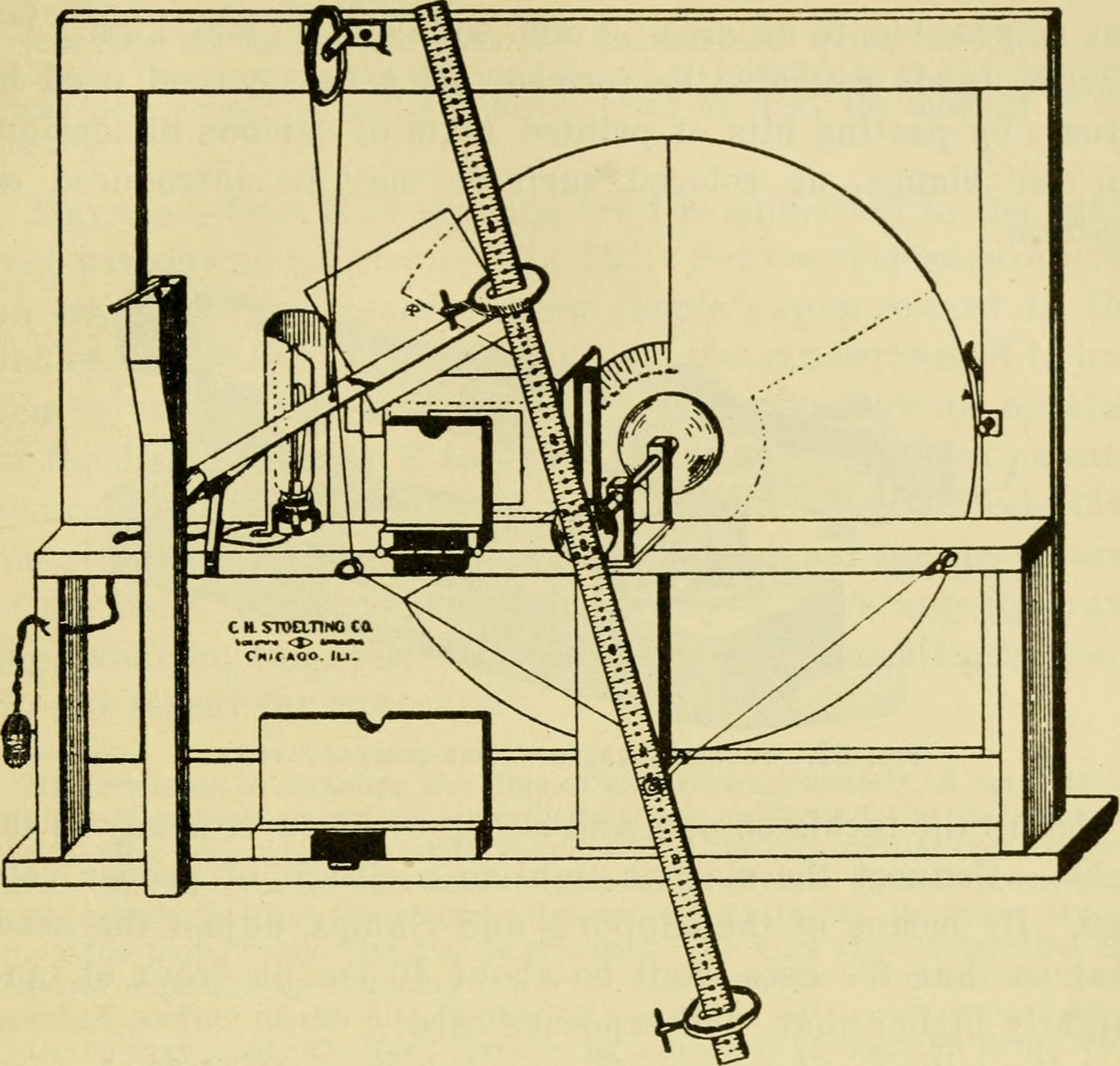
1921 tachistoscope,

A tachistoscope is a device that displays a picture, text, or an object for a specific amount of time. It can be used for various purposes such as to increase recognition speed, to show something too fast to be consciously recognized, or to test which elements of a display are memorable.

Early tachistoscopes were mechanical, using a flat masking screen containing a window. The screen concealed the picture or text until the screen moved, at a known speed, the window over the picture or text, revealing it. The screen continued to move until it hid the picture or text again. Later tachistoscopes used a shutter system typical of a camera in conjunction with a slide or transparency projector. Even later, tachistoscopes used brief illumination, such as from fast-onset and fast-offset fluorescent lamps, of the material to be displayed. By the late 1990s, tachistoscopes had largely been replaced by computers for displaying pictures and text.

== History ==
The first tachistoscope was originally described by the German physiologist A.W. Volkmann in 1859. Samuel Renshaw used it during World War II in the training of fighter pilots to help them identify aircraft silhouettes as friend or foe.

== Applications ==
Before computers became universal, tachistoscopes were used extensively in psychological research to present visual stimuli for controlled durations. Some experiments employed pairs of tachistoscopes so that an experimental participant could be given different stimulation in each visual field.

Tachistoscopes were used during the late 1960s in public schools as an aid to increased reading comprehension for speed reading. There were two types: the student would look through a lens similar to an aircraft bombsight viewfinder and read letters, words, and phrases using manually advanced slide film. The second type projected words and phrases on a screen in sequence. Both types were followed up with comprehension and vocabulary testing.

Tachistoscopes continue to be used in market research, where they are typically used to compare the visual impact, or memorability of marketing materials or packaging designs. Tachistoscopes used for this purpose still typically employ slide projectors rather than computer monitors, due to

- the increased fidelity of the image which can be displayed in this way and
- the opportunity to show large or life-size images.
