= Phi phenomenon =

Optical illusion of apparent motion

The term phi phenomenon is used in a narrow sense for an apparent motion that is observed if two nearby optical stimuli are presented in alternation with a relatively high frequency. In contrast to beta movement, seen at lower frequencies, the stimuli themselves do not appear to move. Instead, a diffuse, amorphous shadowlike something seems to jump in front of the stimuli and occlude them temporarily. This shadow seems to have nearly the color of the background. Max Wertheimer first described this form of apparent movement in his habilitation thesis, published 1912, marking the birth of Gestalt psychology.

In a broader sense, particularly if the plural form phi phenomena is used, it applies also to all apparent movements that can be seen if two nearby optical stimuli are presented in alternation. This includes especially beta movement, which has been regarded as the illusion of motion in cinema and animation, although it can be argued that beta movement indicates long-range apparent motion rather than the short-range apparent motion seen in film. Actually, Wertheimer applied the term "φ-phenomenon" to all apparent movements described in his thesis when he introduced the term in 1912, while he used the term "pure φ" for the objectless movement that was observed at high alternation frequencies. Nevertheless, some commentators assert that he reserved the Greek letter φ for pure, objectless movement.

== Experimental demonstration ==
Wertheimer's classic experiments used two light lines or curves repeatedly presented one after the other using a tachistoscope. If certain, relatively short, intervals between stimuli were used, and the distance between the stimuli was suitable, then his subjects (who happened to be his colleagues Wolfgang Köhler and Kurt Koffka) reported seeing pure "objectless" motion.

However, it turns out to be difficult to demonstrate phi stably and convincingly. To facilitate demonstrating the phenomenon, 21st-century psychologists designed a more vivid experimental arrangement using more than two stimuli. In this demonstration, called "Magni-phi," identical disks are arranged in a circle and, in a rapid sequence, one of the disks is hidden in clockwise or counter-clockwise order. This makes it easier to observe the kind of shadow-like movement Wertheimer discovered. The Magni-phi demonstration is robust to changes of parameters such as timing, size, intensity, number of disks, and viewing distance.

Furthermore, the phenomenon may be observed more reliably even with only two elements if a negative interstimulus interval (ISI) is used (that is, if the periods during which the two elements are visible overlap slightly). In that case, the viewer may see the two objects as stationary and suppose unconsciously that the reappearance of the stimulus on one side means that the object previously displayed in that position has reappeared and not, as observed with beta movement, that the object from the opposite side has just moved to a new position. The crucial factor for this perception is the shortness of discontinuity of the stimulus on each side. This is supported by the observation that two parameters have to be chosen properly to produce the pure phi phenomenon: first the absolute duration of the gap on each side must not exceed about 150 ms., and second, the duration of the gap must not exceed 40% of the stimulus period.

== History of research ==
In his 1912 thesis, Wertheimer introduced the symbol φ (phi) in the following way:

Gegeben sind sukzessiv zwei Objekte als Reize; diese werden empfunden; zuerst wird a gesehen, zuletzt b; zwischen ihnen war die ‚Bewegung von a nach b gesehen'; ohne daß die entsprechende Bewegung resp. die raum-zeit-kontinuierlichen Zwischenlagen zwischen a und b wirklich als Reize exponiert gewesen wären. Der psychische Sachverhalt sei – ohne irgendeine Präjudiz – mit a φ b bezeichnet.

Translation:

Two successive objects are given as stimuli; these are perceived; first a is seen, last b; between them the 'movement from a to b is seen'; without actually having exposed the corresponding movement respectively the time-space-continuous intermediate positions between a and b as stimuli. The physical issue will be denoted – without any prejudice – by a φ b.

Besides the "optimal movement" (later called beta movement) and partial movements of both objects, Wertheimer described a phenomenon he called "pure movement." Concerning this, he summarized the descriptions of his test subjects as follows:

Diese Fälle zeigten sich so, daß auch nicht etwa der Gedanke vorhanden war: ein Objekt habe sich hinüberbewegt; was von Objekten vorhanden war, war in den zwei Lagen gegeben; nicht eines oder eines von ihnen oder ein ähnliches betraf die Bewegung; sondern zwischen ihnen war Bewegung gegeben; nicht eine Objektbewegung. Auch nicht: das Objekt bewegt sich hinüber, ich sehe es nur nicht. Sondern es war einfach Bewegung da; nicht auf ein Objekt bezüglich.

Translation:

These cases appeared in a way, that not even the thought was present: an object has moved across; what was existing of objects was given in two positions; neither one nor the other of them nor a similar one accounted for the movement; but between them there was movement; not a movement of an object. Not even: the object moves across, I just don't see it. Instead, it was just movement there; not regarding an object.

Wertheimer attributed much importance to these observations because, in his opinion, they proved that movement could be perceived directly and was not necessarily deduced from the separate sensation of two optical stimuli in slightly different places at slightly different times. This aspect of his thesis was an important trigger in launching Gestalt psychology.

Starting in the mid-20th century, confusion arose in the scientific literature as to exactly what the phi phenomenon was. One reason could be that the anglophone scientists had difficulties understanding Wertheimer's thesis, which was published in German. Wertheimer's writing style is also idiosyncratic. Furthermore, Wertheimer's thesis does not specify precisely under which parameters "pure movement" was observed. Moreover, it is difficult to reproduce the phenomenon. Edwin Boring's influential history of the psychology of sensation and perception, first published in 1942, contributed to this confusion. Boring listed the phenomena Wertheimer had observed and sorted them by the length of the interstimulus interval. However, Boring placed the phi phenomenon in the wrong position, namely as having a relatively long inter stimulus interval. In fact, with such long intervals, subjects do not perceive movement at all; they only observe two objects appearing successively.

This confusion has probably contributed to the "rediscovery" of the phi phenomenon under other names, for example, as "omega motion," "afterimage motion," and "shadow motion."

== Reverse phi illusion ==
As apparent phi movement is perceived by human's visual system with two stationary and similar optical stimuli presented next to each other exposing successively with high frequency, there is also a reversed version of this motion, which is reversed phi illusion. Reverse phi illusion is the kind of phi phenomenon that fades or dissolves from its positive direction to the displaced negative, so that the apparent motion human perceive is opposite to the actual physical displacement. Reverse phi illusion is often followed by black and white patterns.

It is believed that reverse phi illusion is indeed brightness effects, that it occurs when brightness-reversing picture moving across our retina. It can be explained by mechanisms of visual receptive field model, where visual stimuli are summated spatially (a process that is reverse to spatial differentiation). This spatial summation blurs the contour to a small extent, and thus changes the brightness perceived. Four predictions are confirmed from this receptive field model. First, foveal reverse-phi should be broken down when the displacement is greater than the width of foveal receptive fields. Second, reverse phi illusion exists in the peripheral retina for greater displacements than in the fovea, for receptive fields are greater in the peripheral retina. Third, the spatial summation by the receptive fields could be increased by the visual blurring of the reversed phi illusion projected on a screen with defocus lens. Fourth, the amount of reversed phi illusion should be increasing with the decrease of displacement between positive and negative pictures.

Indeed, our visual system processes forward and reversed phi phenomenon in the same way. Our visual system perceives phi phenomenon between individual points of corresponding brightness in successive frames, and phi movement is determined on a local, point-for-point basis mediated by brightness instead of on a global basis.

=== Neural mechanism underlying sensitivity to reversed phi phenomenon ===
- T4 and T5 motion detectors cells are necessary and sufficient for reversed phi behavior, and there are no other pathways to produce turning responses for reversed phi motion.
- Tangential cells show partial voltage response with the stimulation of reversed phi motion.
- Hassenstein-Reichardt detector model.
- There is substantial responses for reversed-phi in T4 dendrites, and marginal responses in T5 dendrites.

== Phi phenomenon and beta movement ==
Example of beta movement

Phi phenomenon has long been confused with beta movement; however, the founder of Gestalt School of Psychology, Max Wertheimer, has distinguished the difference between them in 1912. While Phi phenomenon and Beta movement can be considered in the same category in a broader sense, they are quite distinct indeed.

Firstly, the difference is on neuroanatomical level. Visual information is processed in two pathways, one processes position and motion, and the other one processes form and color. If an object is moving or changing position, it would be likely to stimulate both pathways and result in a percept of beta movement. Whereas if the object changes position too rapidly, it might result in a percept of pure movement such as phi phenomenon.

Secondly, phi phenomenon and beta movement are also different perceptually. For phi phenomenon, two stimuli A and B are presented successively, what you perceive is some motion passing over A and B; while for beta movement, still with two stimuli A and B presented in succession, what you perceive would be an object actually passing from position A to position B.

The difference also lies on cognitive level, about how our visual system interprets movement, which is based on the assumption that visual system solves an inverse problem of perceptual interpretation. For neighboring stimuli produced by an object, the visual system has to infer the object since the neighboring stimuli do not give the complete picture of the reality. There are more than one way for our visual system to interpret. Therefore, our visual system needs to put constraints to multiple interpretations in order to acquire the unique and authentic one. Principles employed by our visual system to set the constraints are often relevant to simplicity and likelihood.

== Hassenstein–Reichardt detector model ==
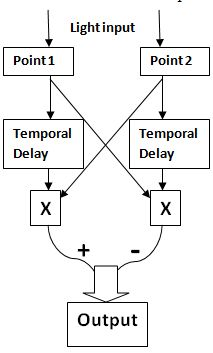
Hassenstein–Reichardt detection model

The Hassenstein–Reichardt detector model is considered to be the first mathematical model to propose that our visual system estimates motion by detecting a temporal cross-correlation of light intensities from two neighboring points, in short a theoretical neural circuit for how our visual system track motion. This model can explain and predict phi phenomenon and its reversed version. This model consists two locations and two visual inputs, that if one input at one location is detected, the signal would be sent to the other location. Two visual inputs would be asymmetrically filtered in time, then the visual contrast at one location is multiplied with the time-delayed contrast from the other location. Finally, the multiplication result would be subtracted to obtain an output.

Therefore, two positive or two negative signals would generate a positive output; but if the inputs are one positive and one negative, the output would be negative. This corresponds to the multiplication rule mathematically.

For phi phenomenon, motion detector would develop to detect a change in light intensities at one point on the retina, then our visual system would compute a correlation of that change with a change in light intensities of a neighboring point on the retina, with a short delay.

=== Reichardt model ===
The Reichardt model is a more complex form of the simplest Hassenstein–Reichardt detector model, which is considered to be a pairwise model with a common quadratic nonlinearity. As Fourier method is considered to be linear method, Reichardt Model introduces multiplicative nonlinearity when our visual responses to luminance changes at different element locations are combined. In this model, one photoreceptor input would be delayed by a filter to be compared by the multiplication with the other input from a neighboring location. The input would be filtered two times in a mirror-symmetrical manner, one before the multiplication and one after the multiplication, which gives a second-order motion estimation. This generalized Reichardt model allows arbitrary filters before the multiplicative nonlinearity as well as filters post-nonlinearity. Phi Phenomenon is often regarded as first-order motion, but reversed phi could be both first-order and second-order, according to this model.

== See also ==
- Color phi phenomenon
- Motion perception
