= Perceptual transparency =

Perceptual transparency is the phenomenon of seeing one surface behind another.

In our everyday life, we often experience the view of objects through transparent surfaces. Physically transparent surfaces allow the transmission of a certain amount of light rays through them. Sometimes nearly the totality of rays is transmitted across the surface without significant changes of direction or chromaticity, as in the case of air; sometimes only light at a certain wavelength is transmitted, as for coloured glass. Perceptually, the problem of transparency is much more challenging: both the light rays coming from the transparent surface and those coming from the object behind it do reach the same retinal location, triggering a single sensorial process. The system somehow maps this information onto a perceptual representation of two different objects. Physical transparency was shown to be neither a sufficient nor a necessary condition for perceptual transparency.

Click on the image to see the full-size version

Click on the image to see the full-size version

Click on the image to see the full-size version

Fuchs (1923) showed that when a small portion of a transparent surface is observed, neither the surface colour, nor the fusion colour is perceived, but only the colour resulting from the fusion of that of the transparent surface and that of the background.

Tudor-Hart (1928) showed it is not possible to perceive transparency in a totally homogeneous field. Metzger (1975) showed that patterns of opaque paper can induce the illusion of transparency, in the absence of physical transparency. In order to distinguish perceptual from physical transparency, the former has often been addressed as transparency illusion.

Paradoxically, however, two models developed within a physical context have long dominated the research in the field of perceptual transparency: the episcotister model by Metelli (1970; 1974) and the filter model by Beck et al. (1984).

== Metelli’s episcotister model and the luminance conditions for transparency ==
Although he was not the first author to study the phenomenon of transparency illusion, the Gestalt psychologist Metelli was probably the one who made the major contribution to the problem. Like his forecomers, Metelli faces the problem from a phenomenical more than from a physiological point of view. In other words, he did not investigate which are the physiological algorithms or the brain networks underlying transparency perception, but studied and classified the conditions under which a transparency illusion is generated. In doing so, Metelli marks an approach to the problem that will be followed by many scientists after him. The model is based on the idea that the perceptual colour scission following transparency is the opposite of colour fusion in a rotating episcotister, i.e. a rotating disk that alternates open and solid sectors. Metelli referred to colour fusion in a physical situation in which an episcotister rotates in front of an opaque background of reflectance A; the episcotister has an open sector of size t (a proportion of the total disk) and a solid sector of size (1-t) having reflectance r. The reflectance of the solid sectors and that of background are fused by rotation to produce a virtual reflectance value $P$:

$P=t*A +(1-t)*R$

that is the weighted sum of background reflectance and episcotister solid sector reflectance.

An episcotister is not a transparent object. Nevertheless, Beck et al. (1984) proposed an alternative model, based on transparent filters, that has the characteristic of including the effects of repetitive reflections between the transparent layer and the underlying surface. Both the episcotister model and the filter model, in their original formulation, were written in terms of reflectance values. A consequence is that their validity as physical models is dependent on the illumination conditions. However, both models can be rewritten in terms of luminance, as shown by Gerbino et al. (1990). Although physically correct in a number of situations, the filter model never gained a significant role in the prediction of perceptual transparency. In spite of being much more complicated than the episcotister model, it doesn’t lead to significant improvements in predictions about the occurrence of the illusion.

While Metelli's episcotister model has long remained the preferred framework for the study of luminance conditions in transparency illusion, its validity as a theory of perception has been challenged by different studies. Beck et al. (1984) showed that only constraints (i) and (ii) imposed by the episcotister model are necessary for illusion of transparency; when constraints (iii) and (iv) are not fulfilled, the illusion can still be experienced. They also argued that the degree of perceived transparency depends on lightness more than reflectance. Masin and Fukuda (1993) proposed as alternative conditions for transparency to (i) and (ii) the ordinal condition p Є (a, q) [or q Є (p, b)], that was shown to agree better than episcotister model with transparency-judgements performed by naïve subjects in a yes-no task (Masin 1997). Metelli's equations were extended to three-dimensional colour space by D'Zmura et al. (1997). According to the model, transparency illusion would be generated by coherent convergence and translation in colour space. However, also in colour space, evidence was found in which the perceptual appearance does not reflect the physical model. For instance, D'Zmura et al. (1997) showed that equiluminant convergence and translation in colour space can elicit an impression of transparency, even if no episcotister nor physical filter can generate this stimulus configuration. Chen and D'Zmura (1998) showed deviations from the predictions of convergence model when the transparent regions have complementary hues.
