= Bernhard Hassenstein =

German biologist and psychobiologist

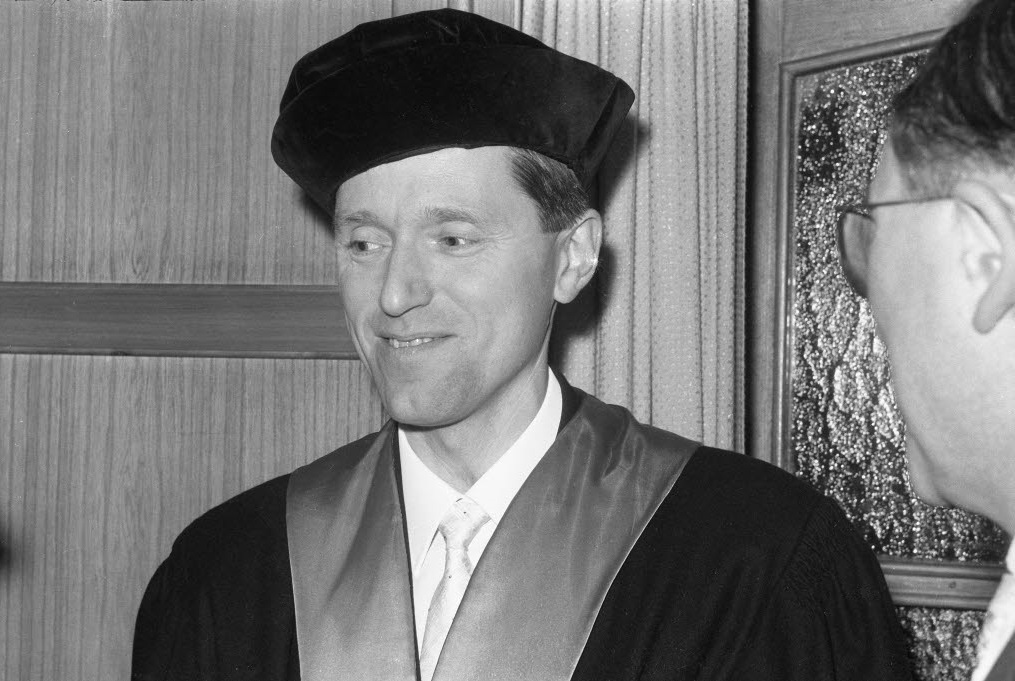
Bernhard Hassenstein in 1965

Bernhard Hassenstein (31 May 1922 – 16 April 2016) was a German biologist and psychobiologist.

== Life and work ==
Bernhard Hassenstein was a student of behavioral physiologist Erich von Holst and one of the leading researchers in the fields of behavioral biology and bio-cybernetics. His scientific work includes substantial contributions to the understanding of motion perception in insects and color vision in humans.

From 1939 to 1949, Hassenstein studied biology, physics, and chemistry in Berlin, Göttingen, and Heidelberg. During his military service in 1943, he met Werner E. Reichardt, who eventually became his academic partner. In 1948, he worked as an assistant at the Max Planck Institute for Marine Biology in Wilhelmshaven. From 1954-1958, he worked at the Zoophysiological Institute of the University of Tübingen.

In 1958, Hassenstein worked with physicist Werner Reichardt and engineer Hans Wenking to found the world's first working group on cybernetics at the Max Planck Institute for Biology in Tübingen. In 1960, he was appointed Professor of Zoology at the University of Freiburg.

Hassenstein retired in 1984. He reportedly died on 16 April 2016 in Freiburg, at the age of 93.

== Memberships ==
- Heidelberg Academy of Sciences, since 1961
- German Academy of Sciences Leopoldina, since 1965
- Wissenschaftsrat, from 1968 to 1972

== Honors ==
- German Society of Pediatrics - Honorary Member (1975)
- Max Born Medal for Responsibility in Science (1981)
- Charles Küpfmüller ring the Technical University of Darmstadt (1981)
- Dr Albert Wander Prize for migrant AG in Bern (1984)
- Cothenius Medal of the German Academy of Natural Scientists Leopoldina (1993)
- Exhibit "Brace Globe and Correlation Analysis" (with Werner Reichardt) in the Deutsches Museum Bonn (with Werner Reichardt) (1995)
- Honorary Prize of Culture Award (Reinhold Schneider Prize) of the city of Freiburg (with Helma Hassenstein) (2002)

== Main Areas of Research ==
- Biological Cybernetics
- Sensory and nerve physiology
- Behavioral biology of the Child
- Natural theory of concepts

== Writings (selection) ==
- Goethe's morphology as self-critical science and current validity of their results. Weimar: Böhlau, 1950.
- Principles of comparative anatomy in Geoffroy Saint-Hilaire, Cuvier and Goethe 1958th
- How insects see movements? Naturwissenschaften 7, 207–214. Science 7, 207–214. 1961. 1961st
- "Cybernetics and biological research", in Gessner F: "Handbook of Biology, Part I", Frankfurt am Main. Akad. Verl.Ges. Akad Verl.Ges. Athenaion, 1966.
- Modeling for data processing in color vision. Kybernetik 4, 209–223, 1968 Cybernetics 4, 209-223, 1968
- Political behavior as a problem of biological anthropology. Bad Godesberg: Alexander von Humboldt Foundation, 1968.
- Young animal and human being in view of comparative ethology. Stuttgart: Gentner, 1970.
- Information and control in the living organism: An elementary introduction. London: Chapman Hall, 1971.
- "Homoiostasis and coordination," "Rules of the central services" and "behavior", in Czihak G., H. Langer and H. Ziegler: "Biology - A Textbook", Heidelberg, Berlin. 1976. 1976th
- Biological Cybernetics: an elementary introduction. 5. Ed - Heidelberg: Quelle & Meyer, 1977.
- The child in preschool and primary school / contributions by Bernhard Hassenstein; Heinelt Gottfried, Christa Meves. - 7 Freiburg: Herder, 1978.
- Freiburg lectures on the biology of man. Heidelberg: Quelle & Meyer, 1979.
- Instinct, learning, playing, insight in behavioral biology. Munich: Piper, 1980.

== See also ==
University of Freiburg Faculty of Biology
