= Peripheral drift illusion =

Type of optical illusion

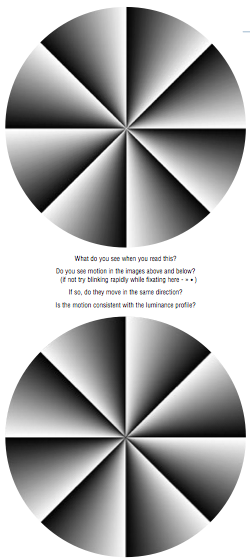
Two images that exhibit peripheral drift illusion. The different pattern of light and dark causes the two circles to appear to rotate in opposite directions.

The peripheral drift illusion (PDI) refers to a motion illusion generated by the presentation of a sawtooth luminance grating in the visual periphery. This illusion was first described by Faubert and Herbert (1999), although a similar effect called the "escalator illusion" was reported by Fraser and Wilcox (1979). A variant of the PDI was created by Kitaoka Akiyoshi and Ashida (2003) who took the continuous sawtooth luminance change, and reversed the intermediate greys. Kitaoka has created numerous variants of the PDI, and one called "rotating snakes" has become very popular. The latter demonstration has kindled great interest in the PDI.

The illusion is easily seen when fixating off to the side of it, and then blinking as fast as possible. Most observers can see the illusion easily when reading text with the illusion figure in the periphery. The motion of such illusions is consistently perceived in a dark-to-light direction.

Two papers have been published examining the neural mechanisms involved in seeing the PDI (Backus & Oruç, 2005; Conway et al., 2005). Faubert and Herbert (1999) suggested the illusion was based on temporal differences in luminance processing producing a signal that tricks the motion system. Both of the articles from 2005 are broadly consistent with those ideas, although contrast appears to be an important factor (Backus & Oruç, 2005).

== Rotating snakes ==
Illusion similar to Rotating Snakes

Rotating snakes is an optical illusion developed by Professor Akiyoshi Kitaoka in 2003. A type of peripheral drift illusion, the "snakes" consist of several bands of color which resemble coiled serpents. Although the image is static, the snakes appear to be moving in circles. The speed of perceived motion depends on the frequency of microsaccadic eye movements (Alexander & Martinez-Conde, 2019).

== Gallery ==
Illusion similar to Primrose Field by Kitaoka Akiyoshi

A peripheral drift illusion by Paul Nasca

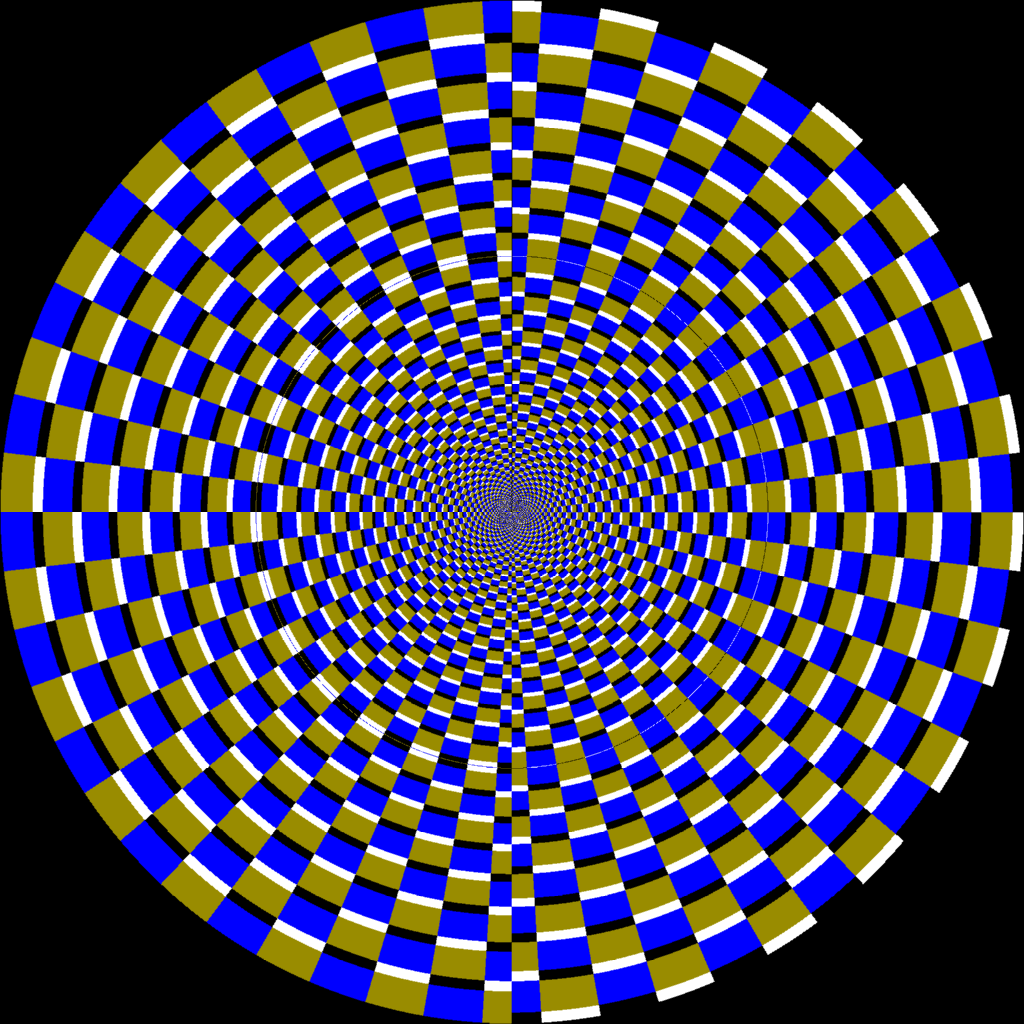
A peripheral drift illusion by Paul Nasca

Combination of a Café wall illusion and a horizontal peripheral drift illusion

A peripheral drift illusion giving a throbbing effect
