= Motion aftereffect =

Optical illusion

Example movie which produces distortion illusion after one watches it and looks away.

The motion aftereffect (MAE) is a visual illusion experienced after viewing a moving visual stimulus for a time (tens of milliseconds to minutes) with stationary eyes, and then fixating a stationary stimulus. The stationary stimulus appears to move in the opposite direction to the original (physically moving) stimulus. The motion aftereffect is believed to be the result of motion adaptation.

For example, if one looks at a waterfall for about a minute and then looks at the stationary rocks at the side of the waterfall, these rocks appear to be moving upwards slightly. The illusory upwards movement is the motion aftereffect. This particular motion aftereffect is also known as the waterfall illusion.

Another example can be seen when one looks at the center of a rotating spiral for several seconds. The spiral can exhibit outward or inward motion. When one then looks at any stationary pattern, it appears to be moving in the opposite direction. This form of the motion aftereffect is known as the spiral aftereffect.

It also sometimes works with bright colors: if one stares at one for too long, then look at its opposite, it will appear to grow or shrink. This is sometimes considered a case of normal afterimage.

== Explanation ==
Neurons coding a particular movement reduce their responses with time of exposure to a constantly moving stimulus; this is neural adaptation. Neural adaptation also reduces the spontaneous, baseline activity of these same neurons when responding to a stationary stimulus (see, for example, Barlow & Hill, 1963; Srinivasan & Dvorak, 1979; Glasser, Tsui, Pack, & Tadin, 2011). One theory is that perception of stationary objects—for example, rocks beside a waterfall—is coded as the balance among the baseline responses of neurons coding all possible directions of motion. Neural adaptation of neurons stimulated by downward movement reduces their baseline activity, tilting the balance in favor of upward movement.

== History ==
Aristotle (approx. 350 B.C.) reported illusory movement after viewing constant movement, but he did not specify its direction. The first clear specification of the motion aftereffect was by Jan Evangelista Purkyně (1820), who observed it after looking at a cavalry parade. Robert Addams (1834) reported the waterfall illusion after observing it at the Falls of Foyers in Scotland. According to Verstraten (1996), the term waterfall illusion was coined by Thompson (1880). According to Wade, Thompson, and Morgan, (2014), the most comprehensive single article on the phenomenon is by Gustav Adolf Wohlgemuth (1911).

== See also ==
- Afterimage
- Motion perception

== Sources ==
- Addams, R. (1834). An account of a peculiar optical phenomenon seen after having looked at a moving body. London and Edinburgh Philosophical Magazine and Journal of Science, 5, 373–374
- Aristotle (approx. 350 B.C.) Parva Naturalia.
- Barlow, H.B., & Hill, R.M. (1963). Evidence for a physiological explanation of the waterfall illusion. Nature, 200, 1345-1347.
- Glasser, D. M., Tsui, J. M., Pack, C. C., & Tadin, D. (2011). Perceptual and neural consequences of rapid motion adaptation. PNAS Plus, 108(45), E1080–E1088. doi:10.1073/pnas.1101141108
- Petersen, S. E., Baker, J. F., & Allman, J. M. (1985). Direction-specific adaptation in area MT of the owl monkey, Brain Research, 346, 146-150.
- Purkinje, J. E. (1820) Beiträge zur näheren Kenntniss des Schwindels aus heautognostischen Daten. Medicinische Jahrbücher des kaiserlich-königlichen österreichischen Staates, 6, 79–125.
- Srinivasan, M. V., & Dvorak, D. R. (1979). The waterfall illusion in an insect visual system. Vision Research, 19, 1435-1437.
- Thompson, P. (1880). Optical illusions of motion. Brain, 3, 289-298.
- Tootell, R. B., Reppas, J. B., Dale, A. M., Look, R. B., Sereno, M. I., Malach, R., Brady, T. J., & Rosen, B. R. (1995), Visual motion aftereffect in human cortical area MT revealed by functional magnetic resonance imaging, Nature, 375", 139-141.
- Verstraten, F. A. J. (1996). On the ancient history of the direction of the motion aftereffect. Perception, 25, 1177-1188.
- Wade, N. J., Thompson, P., & Morgan, M. (2014). The after-effect of Adolf Wohlgemuth’s seen motion. Perception, 43, 229-234. doi: 10.1068/p4304ed
- Wohlgemuth, A. (1911). On the after-effect of seen movement. British Journal of Psychology Monograph Supplement, 1-117.

== Bibliography ==
- Mather, G., Verstraten, F., & Anstis, S. (1998). The motion aftereffect: A modern perspective. Cambridge, Mass: MIT Press
