= Beta movement =

Optical illusion of motion

Example of the beta movement effect

The term beta movement is used for the optical illusion of apparent motion in which the very short projection of one figure and a subsequent very short projection of a more or less similar figure in a neighbouring location are experienced as one figure moving.

The illusion of motion caused by animation and film is sometimes believed to rely on beta movement, as an alternative to the older explanation known as persistence of vision. However, the human visual system can't distinguish between the short-range apparent motion of film and real motion (where the successive positions of figures in successive impressions largely overlap), while the long-range apparent motion of beta movement is recognised as different and processed in a different way.

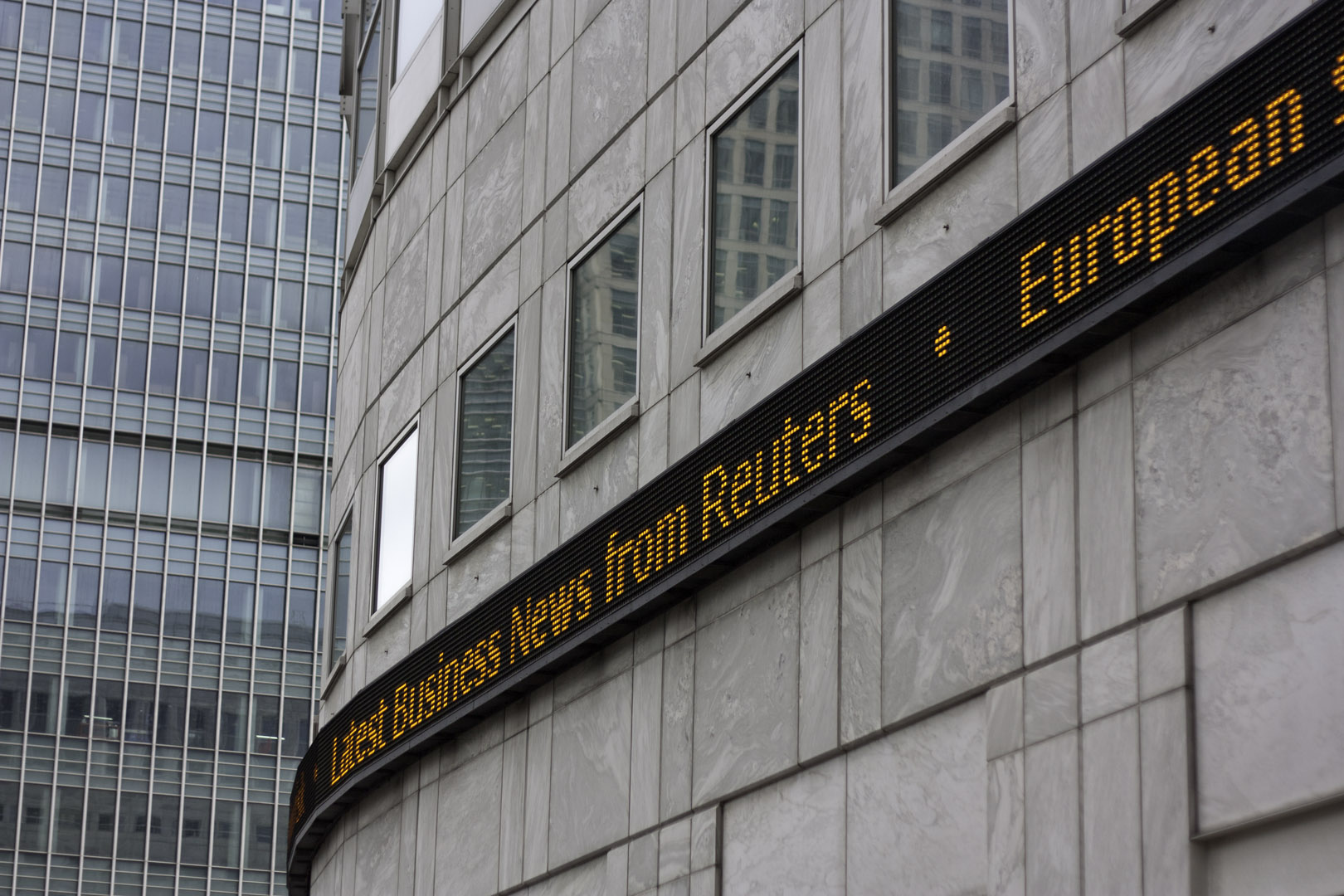
Canary Wharf news ticker

== History ==
Observations of apparent motion through quick succession of images go back to the 19th century. In 1833, Joseph Plateau introduced what became known as the phenakistiscope, an early animation device based on a stroboscopic effect. The principle of this "philosophical toy" would inspire the development of cinematography at the end of the century. Most authors who have since described the illusion of seeing motion in the fast succession of stationary images, maintained that the effect is due to persistence of vision, either in the form of afterimages on the retina or with a mental process filling in the intervals between the images.

In 1875, Sigmund Exner showed that, under the right conditions, people will see two quick, spatially separated but stationary electrical sparks as a single light moving from place to place, while quicker flashes were interpreted as motion between two stationary lights. Exner argued that the impression of the moving light was a perception (from a mental process) and the motion between the stationary lights as pure sense.

In 1912, Max Wertheimer published an influential study that would lead to the foundation of Gestalt psychology. In the discussed experiments, he asked test subjects what they saw when viewing successive tachistoscope projections of two similar shapes at two alternating locations on a screen. The results differed depending on the frequency of the flashes of the tachistoscope. At low frequencies, successive appearances of similar figures at different spots were perceived. At medium frequencies, it seemed like one figure moved from one position to the following position, regarded as "optimale Bewegung" (optimal motion) by Wertheimer. No shape was seen in between the two locations. At higher speeds, when test subjects believed to see both of the fast blinking figures more or less simultaneously, a moving objectless phenomenon was seen between and around the projected figures. Wertheimer used the Greek letter φ (phi) to designate illusions of motion and thought of the high-frequency objectless illusion as a "pure phi phenomenon", which he supposed was a more direct sensory experience of motion. Wertheimer's work became famous due to his demonstrations of the phi phenomenon, while the optimal motion illusion was regarded as the phenomenon well-known from movies.

In 1913, Friedrich Kenkel, a co-worker of Kurt Koffka (one of Wertheimer's test subjects), compared the motion illusion of the successive projections of figures that are actually different in size –which he dubbed "β-Bewegung" (beta movement)– with that of figures with apparent differences in size, like those of the Müller-Lyer illusion –which he dubbed "α-Bewegung" (alpha movement). Kenkel pointed out that Wertheimer had already proven how β-Bewegungen give an intense and real sense of motion, which can even surpass the observation of real moving objects in clarity. He found that α-Bewegungen were as convincing as β-Bewegungen. Kenkel's distinction between the variations has hardly been remembered, but his term "beta movement" became associated with the type of motion illusion that Wertheimer had considered optimal.

== Confusion about phi phenomenon and beta movement ==
Wertheimer's objectless phi phenomenon and his optimal illusion of motion (beta movement) are often confused in explanations of film and animation, but they are quite different perceptually and neither really explains the short-range apparent motion seen in film.

In beta movement, two stimuli, $a$ and $b$, appear in succession at intermediate frequencies, but are perceived as the motion of a single object, $a$, into position $b$. In phi movement, the two stimuli $a$ and $b$ appear in very rapid succession, but are perceived as the motion of a vague shadowy something passing over $a$ and $b$. There are many factors that determine whether one will experience beta movement or the phi phenomenon in a particular circumstance. They include the luminance of the stimuli in contrast to the background, the size of the stimuli, how far apart they are, how long each one is displayed, and precisely how much time passes between them (or the extent to which they overlap in time).

== See also ==
- Ternus illusion
- Phi phenomenon
- Stroboscopic effect
- Apparent motion
- Persistence of vision
