= Strobe light =

Device producing regular flashes of light

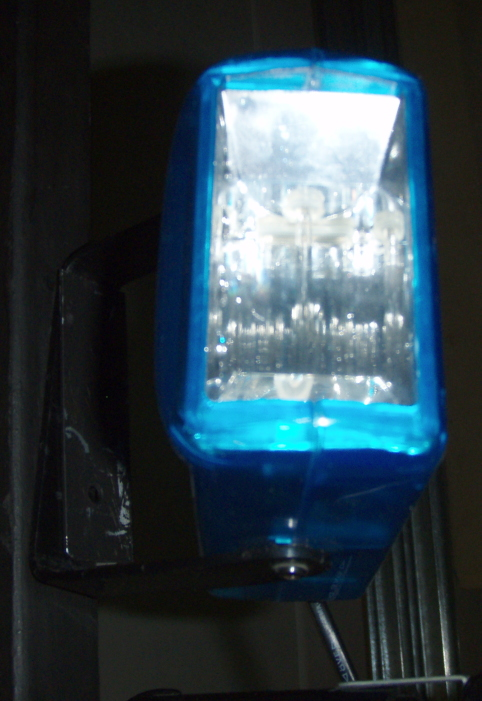
Blue strobe light

A strobe light or stroboscopic lamp, commonly called a strobe, is a device used to produce regular flashes of light. It is one of a number of devices that can be used as a stroboscope. The word originated from the Ancient Greek στρόβος (stróbos), meaning "act of whirling".

A typical commercial strobe light has a flash energy in the region of 10 to 150 joules, and discharge times as short as a few milliseconds, often resulting in a flash power of several kilowatts. Larger strobe lights can be used in “continuous” mode, producing extremely intense illumination.

The light source is commonly a xenon flash lamp, or flashtube, which has a complex spectrum and a color temperature of approximately 5,600 kelvins. To obtain colored light, colored gels may be used.

== Scientific explanation of flashtubes ==
Strobe lights usually use flashtubes with energy supplied from a capacitor, an energy storage device much like a battery, but capable of charging and releasing energy much faster. In a capacitor-based strobe, the capacitor is charged up to around 300 V. Once the capacitor has been charged, to trigger the flash a small amount of power is diverted into a trigger transformer, a small transformer with a high turns ratio. This generates the weak but high-voltage spike required to ionize the xenon gas in a flash tube. An arc is created inside the tube, which acts as a path for the capacitor to discharge through, allowing the capacitor to quickly release its energy into the arc. The capacitor's energy rapidly heats the xenon gas, creating an extremely bright plasma discharge, which is seen as a flash.

A strobe without a capacitor storage device simply discharges mains voltages across the tube once it's fired. This type of strobe requires no charging time and allows for much quicker flash rates, but drastically reduces the lifetime of the flash tube if powered for significant periods of time. Such strobes require a form of current limiting, without which the flash tube would attempt to draw high currents from the electricity source, potentially tripping electrical breakers or causing voltage drops in the power supply line.

The duration of a single flash depends on the particular strobe being used and its settings. Strobes for studio lighting often have a range of power settings. For a given strobe, higher light output corresponds to a longer flash duration. For example, the Flashpoint Rapid 1200 HSS Monolight has a flash duration as long as 5.6 ms (1/180 sec) at its highest output setting, or as short as 68 μs (1/14,814 sec) at its lowest output setting. Strobes with significantly shorter flash durations are commercially available, some with flash durations less than 1 μs. For example, the SPOT strobe by Prism Science Works provides a flash duration of order 0.5 μs

Some strobes even offer continuous mode of operation whereby the arc is sustained, providing extremely high intensity light, but usually only for small amounts of time to prevent overheating and eventual breakage of the flash tube.

== Applications ==
=== Strobe beacons ===
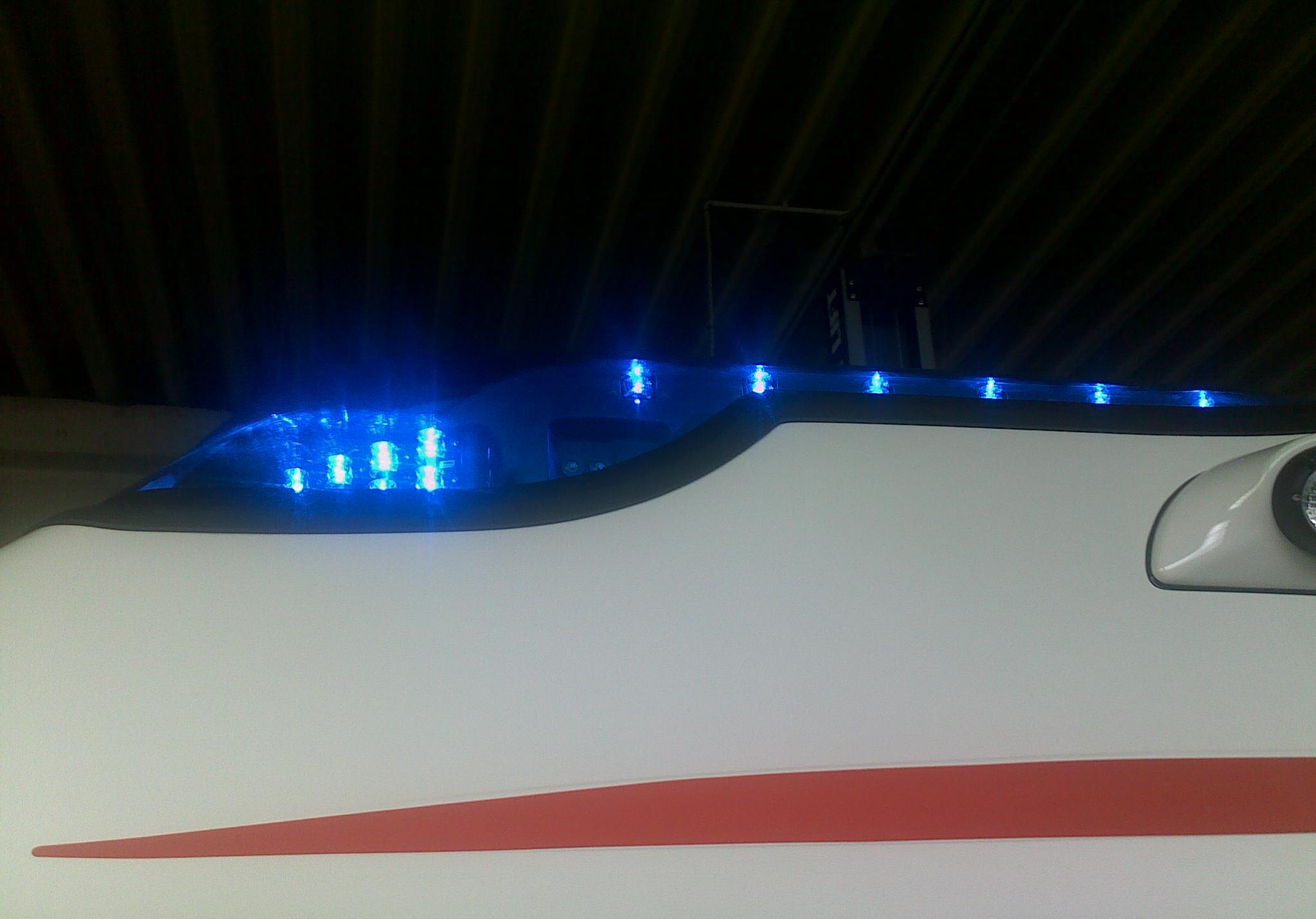
LED strobe beacon on emergency vehicle

A strobe beacon is a flashing electric lamp used in a variety of industries as an attention-getting device, either to warn of possible hazards, or to attract potential customers. Strobe beacons are similar to rotating beacons, but are more energy efficient, and with no moving parts, are more reliable and less likely to break.

Gas strobe beacons include Xenon flash lamp and halogen varieties. Gas strobe beacons consist of a gas-filled tube surrounded by a lens. When electricity is applied, the tube flashes and is magnified by the lens, and a 360 degree light is emitted. The intensity of the light depends on the amount of electricity provided.

These lenses come in a variant of colors, mainly clear, yellow, amber, red, blue, and green. The lens color can affect the intensity of light.

LED strobe beacons consist of a base, a LED or group of LEDs, and a cover. A solid state flash controller is located within the base, which allows the LED beacon to operate in a variety of flash patterns.

Strobe lights are often used for aircraft anti-collision lighting both on aircraft themselves and also on tall stationary objects, such as television and radio towers. Other applications are in alarm systems, emergency vehicle lighting, theatrical lighting (most notably to simulate lightning), and as high-visibility aircraft collision avoidance lights. They are still widely used in law enforcement and other emergency vehicles, though they are slowly being replaced by LED technology in this application, as they themselves largely replaced halogen lighting. Strobes are used by scuba divers as an emergency signaling device.

=== Stroboscopic effect ===
A strobe light flashing at the proper period can appear to freeze or reverse cyclical motion.

Special calibrated strobe lights, capable of flashing up to hundreds of times per second, are used in industry to stop the appearance of motion of rotating and other repetitively operating machinery and to measure, or adjust, the rotation speeds or cycle times. Since this stop is only apparent, a marked point on the rotating body will either appear to move backward or forward, or not move, depending on the frequency of the strobe-flash. If the flash occurs equal to the period of rotation (or an even multiple, i.e. 2*π*n/ω, where n is an integer and ω the angular frequency), the marked point will appear to not move. Any non-integer flash setting will make the mark appear to move forward or backward, e.g. a slight increase of the flash frequency will make the point appear to move backward.

A common use of a strobe flash is to optimize a car engine's efficiency at a certain rotational period by directing the strobe-light towards a mark on the flywheel on the engine's main axle. The strobe-light tool for such ignition timing is called a timing light. Strobe lighting has also been used to see the movements of the vocal cords in slow motion during speech, a procedure known as video-stroboscopy.

=== Other ===
Strobelights are often used to give an illusion of slow motion in nightclubs and raves, and are available for home use for special effects or entertainment.

== History ==
The origin of strobe lighting dates to 1931, when Harold Eugene "Doc" Edgerton employed a flashing lamp to make an improved stroboscope for the study of moving objects, eventually resulting in dramatic photographs of objects such as bullets in flight.

EG&G [now a division of URS] was founded by Harold E. Edgerton, Kenneth J. Germeshausen and Herbert E. Grier in 1947 as Edgerton, Germeshausen and Grier, Inc. and today bears their initials. In 1931, Edgerton and Germeshausen had formed a partnership to study high-speed photographic and stroboscopic techniques and their applications. Grier joined them in 1934, and in 1947, EG&G was incorporated. During World War II, the government's Manhattan Project made use of Edgerton's discoveries to photograph atomic explosions; it was a natural evolution that the company would support the Atomic Energy Commission in its weapons research and development after the war. This work for the Commission provided the historic foundation to the Company's present-day technology base.

Internally triggered Strobotrons (light-output optimized thyratrons) were available as well as flood-beam-CRT-type, grid-controlled Vacuum stroboscopic light sources with fast phosphors.

The strobe light was popularized on the club scene during the 1960s when it was used to reproduce and enhance the effects of LSD trips. Ken Kesey used strobe lighting in coordination with the music of the Grateful Dead during his Acid Tests. In early 1966, Andy Warhol's lights engineer, Danny Williams, pioneered the use of multiple stroboscopes, slides and film projections simultaneously onstage during the 1966 Exploding Plastic Inevitable shows, and at Bill Graham's request, Williams built an enhanced stroboscopic light show to be used at Fillmore West.

== Fechner color ==
Rapid flashing of a stroboscopic light can give the illusion that white light is tinged with color, known as Fechner color. Within certain ranges, the apparent color can be controlled by the frequency of the flash. Effective stimuli frequencies go from 3 Hz upwards, with optimal frequencies of about 4–6 Hz. The colours are an illusion generated in the mind of the observer and not a real color. The Benham's top demonstrates the effect.

== Seizures ==
Sometimes strobe lighting can trigger seizures. Several public incidents of photosensitive epilepsy have occurred. Studies have shown that the majority of people that are susceptible to the strobing effects can have symptoms, albeit rarely, at 15 Hz-70 Hz. Other studies have shown epileptic symptoms at the 15 Hz rate with over 90 seconds of continuous staring at a strobe light.

While no specific legal requirements are known for public usage, relevant safety control measures should be employed to minimize epileptic seizures and potential trips or falls from disturbed vision. Strobe light flash rates should not exceed 4 flashes per second; when multiple strobe lights are used, flashes should be synchronized. Warnings should be posted at venue entryways, e.g., “WARNING: Strobe lights are used during this performance”. Staff, crew, audiences and viewers should be informed prior to any usage of flickering lights or high contrast image changes.

The strobe rate of fire alarms in schools, hospitals, stadiums, etc. for any emergency notification should be maintained between 1.0 - 2.0 Hertz as a seizure precaution.

Most strobe lights on sale to the public are factory-limited to about 10–12 Hz (10–12 flashes per second) in their internal oscillators, although externally triggered strobe lights will often flash as frequently as possible.

== See also ==
- Electrotachyscope, an early motion picture system in limited use between 1886 and 1894.
- Emergency vehicle lighting
- Flicker (light), the study of directly visible change in brightness of a light source
- Flicker fusion threshold, the frequency at which an intermittent light stimulus appears to be completely steady to the average human observer
- Tachometer, an instrument measuring the rotation speed of a shaft or disk,
- Zoetrope, an early device from 1813 that produced the illusion of motion by displaying a sequence of drawings or photographs showing progressive phases of that motion.
- Jerkiness, discontinuity in motion pictures, also called strobing
- Photographic flash, often also referred to as a strobe light
- Wagon-wheel effect, an optical illusion in cinematography which a spoked wheel appears to rotate differently from its true rotation
- Air-gap flash, a photographic light source capable of producing sub-microsecond light flashes, allowing for (ultra) high-speed photography
