= Contact breaker =

Type of electrical switch

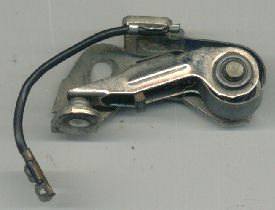
Breaker arm with contact points at the left. The pivot is on the right and the cam follower is in the middle of the breaker arm.

A contact breaker (or "points") is a type of electrical switch, found in the ignition systems of spark-ignition internal combustion engines. The switch is automatically operated by a cam driven by the engine. The timing of operation of the switch is set so that a spark is produced at the right time to ignite the compressed air/fuel mixture in the cylinder of the engine. A mechanism may be provided to slightly adjust timing to allow for varying load on the engine. Since these contacts operate frequently, they are subject to wear, causing erratic ignition of the engine. More recent engines use electronic means to trigger the spark, which eliminated contact wear and allows computer control of ignition timing.

== Purpose ==
The purpose of the contact breaker is to interrupt the current flowing in the primary winding of the ignition coil. When the current stops flowing, the resulting collapse of the magnetic field in the primary winding induces a high voltage in the secondary winding. This causes a very high voltage to appear at the coil output for a short period—enough to arc across the electrodes of a spark plug.

== Operation ==
The contact breaker is operated by an engine-driven cam. On an engine with a distributor, the contact breaker can be found beneath the distributor cap. The position of the contact breaker is set so that it opens (and hence generates a spark) at exactly the optimum moment to ignite the fuel/air mixture. This point is generally just before the piston reaches the top of its compression stroke. The contact breaker is often mounted on a plate that is able to rotate relative to the camshaft operating it. The plate is most typically rotated by a centrifugal mechanism, thus advancing the ignition timing (making the spark occur earlier) at higher revolutions. This gives the fuel ignition process time to proceed so that the resulting combustion reaches its maximum pressure at the proper point in the crankshaft's rotation.

Many engines are also fitted with a manifold vacuum-operated servomechanism to provide additional rotation of the plate's position (within limits), in order to advance the timing when the engine is required to speed up on demand. Advancing the ignition timing helps to prevent pre-ignition (or pinging).

== Parts ==
In aircraft engines the contact breaker is normally pivotless meaning that one breaker moves and the other does not. The movable breaker is connected to a insulated leaf spring that pushes it onto the stationary breaker. The cam follower is pushed against the cam via a leaf spring. Then when the cam moves the cam follower separates the movable breaker from the stationary breaker.

== Disadvantages of contact breakers ==
Since they open and close so often (several times with every turn of the engine on distributor-equipped engines), contact breaker points and cam followers can suffer from wear—both mechanical and pitting caused by arcing across the contacts. This latter effect is largely prevented by placing a capacitor parallel across the contact breaker—this is often referred to by the more old fashioned term condenser by mechanics. As well as suppressing arcing, it helps boost the coil output by creating a resonant LC circuit with the coil windings.

A drawback of using a mechanical switch as part of the ignition timing is that it is not very precise, needs regular adjustment of the dwell (contact) angle, and at higher revolutions, its mass becomes significant, leading to poor operation at higher engine speeds. These effects can largely be overcome using electronic ignition systems, where the contact breakers are retrofitted by a magnetic (Hall effect) or optical sensor device. However, because of their simplicity, and since contact breaker points gradually degrade instead of catastrophically failing, they are still used on aircraft engines.

== See also ==
- Ignition magneto
- Contactor
- Relay
