= Stroboscope =

Instrument used to study object movement

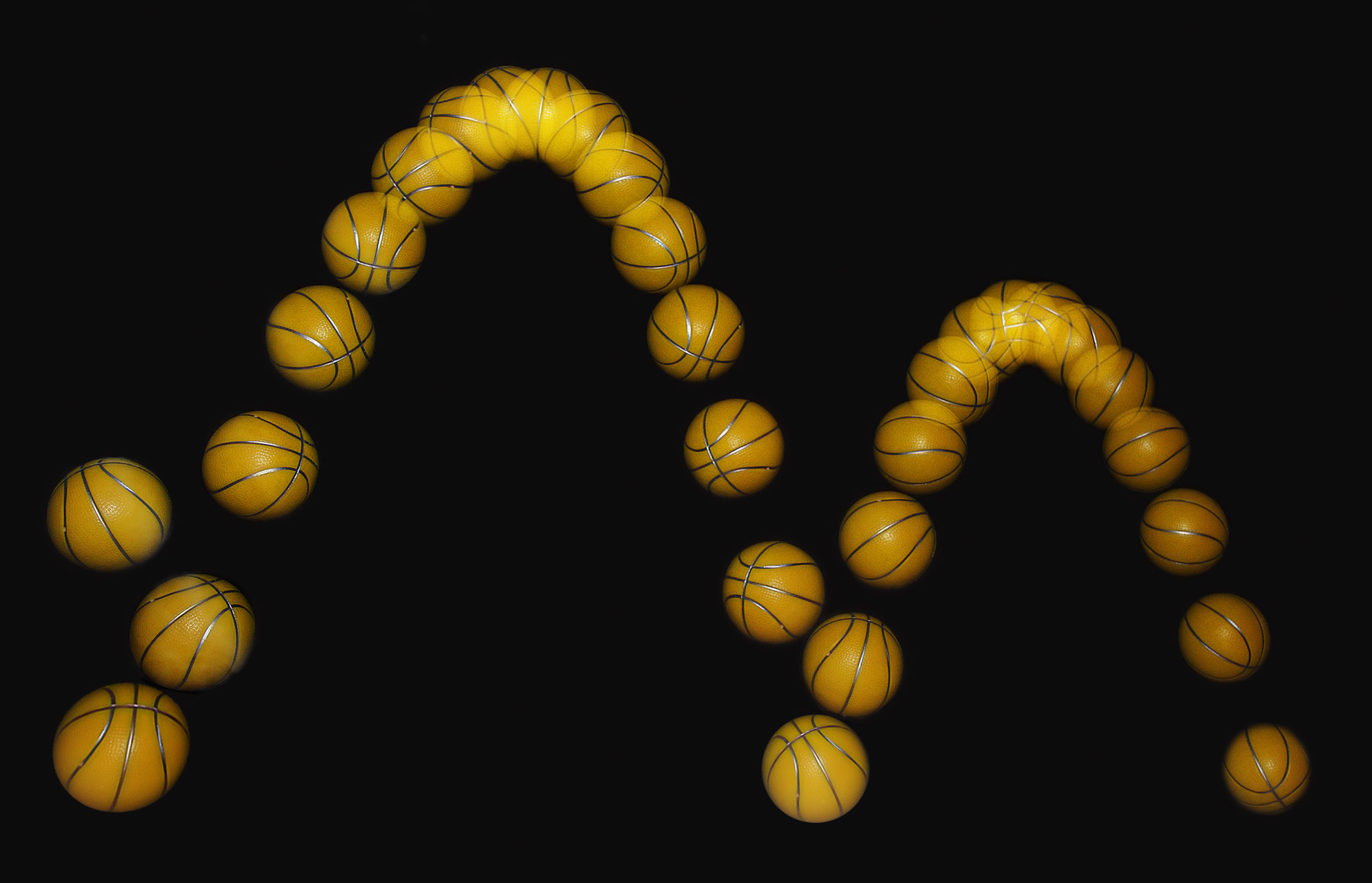
A bouncing ball captured with a stroboscopic flash at 25 images per second.

A strobe light flashing at the proper period can appear to freeze or reverse cyclical motion

A stroboscope, also known as a strobe, is an instrument used to make a cyclically moving object appear to be slow-moving, or stationary. It consists of either a rotating disk with slots or holes or a lamp such as a flashtube which produces brief repetitive flashes of light. Usually, the rate of the stroboscope is adjustable to different frequencies. When a rotating or vibrating object is observed with the stroboscope at its vibration frequency (or a submultiple of it), it appears stationary. Thus stroboscopes are also used to measure frequency.

The principle is used for the study of rotating, reciprocating, oscillating or vibrating objects. Machine parts and vibrating string are common examples. A stroboscope used to set the ignition timing of internal combustion engines is called a timing light.

== Mechanical ==
In its simplest mechanical form, a stroboscope can be a rotating cylinder or disc with evenly spaced holes or slots placed in the line of sight between the observer and the moving object. If the rotational speed is perfectly synchronised with the speed of the observed system or with an exact multiple of that speed, the system appears motionless, while it can be seen in apparently slowed-down motion if the rotational speed is adjusted to be slightly out of synch. The illusion is caused by temporal aliasing, and is commonly known as the stroboscopic effect.

=== Electronic ===
In electronic versions, the perforated disc is replaced by a lamp capable of emitting brief and rapid flashes of light. Typically a gas-discharge or solid-state lamp is used, because they are capable of emitting light nearly instantly when power is applied, and extinguishing just as fast when the power is removed.

By comparison, incandescent lamps have a brief warm-up when energized, followed by a cool-down period when power is removed. These delays result in smearing and blurring of detail of objects partially illuminated during the warm-up and cool-down periods. For most applications, incandescent lamps are too slow for clear stroboscopic effects. Yet when operated from an AC source they are mostly fast enough to cause audible hum (at double mains frequency) on optical audio playback such as on film projection.

The frequency of the flash is adjusted so that it is an equal to, or a unit fraction of the object's cyclic speed, at which point the object is seen to be either stationary or moving slowly backward or forward, depending on the flash frequency.

Neon lamps or light-emitting diodes are commonly used for low-intensity strobe applications. Neon lamps were more common before the development of solid-state electronics, but are being replaced by LEDs in most low-intensity strobe applications.

Xenon flash lamps are used for medium- and high-intensity strobe applications. Sufficiently rapid or bright flashing may require active cooling such as forced-air or water cooling to prevent the xenon flash lamp from melting.

== History ==
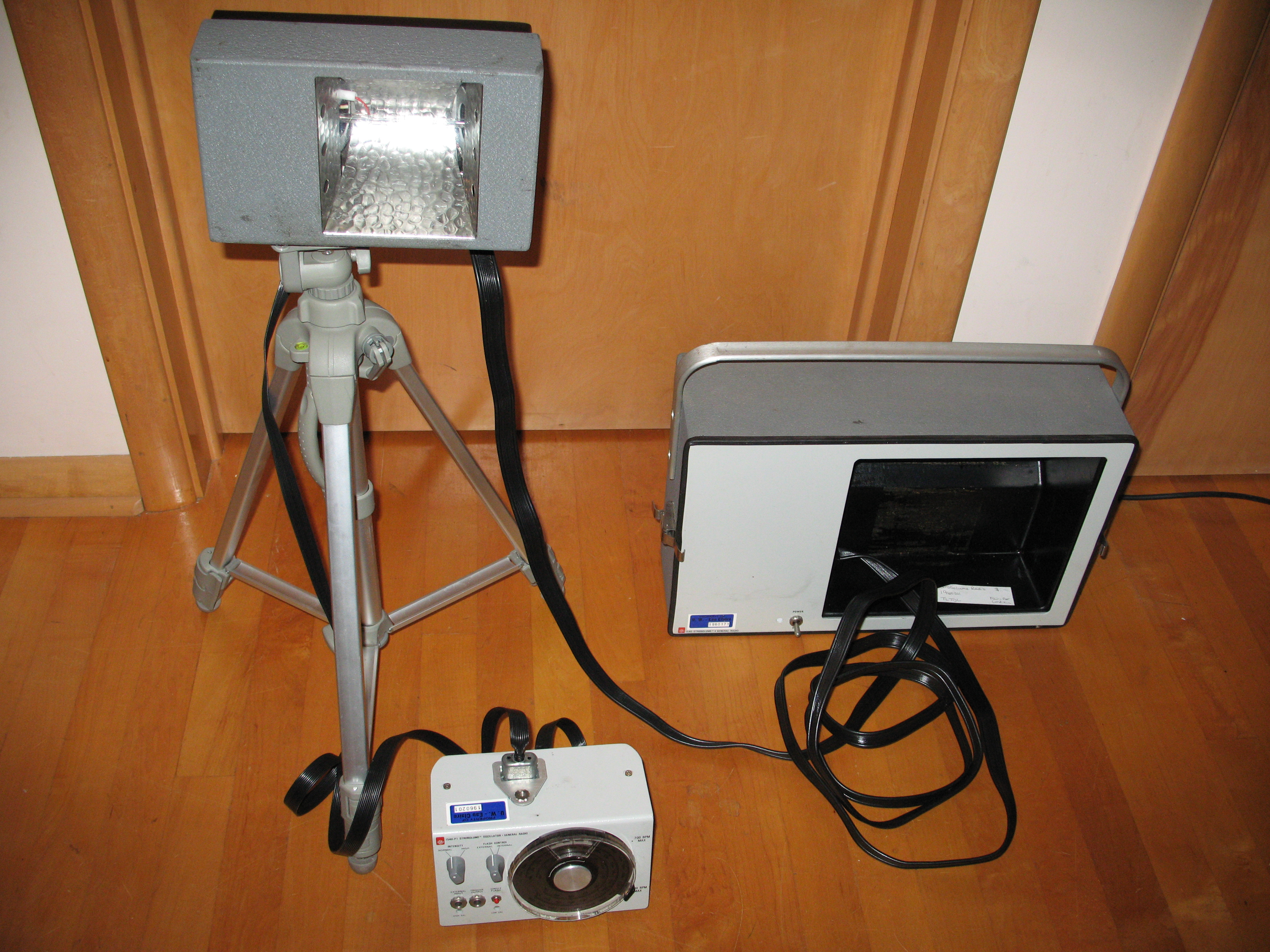
1540 Strobolume, a professional grade stroboscope produced by General Radio

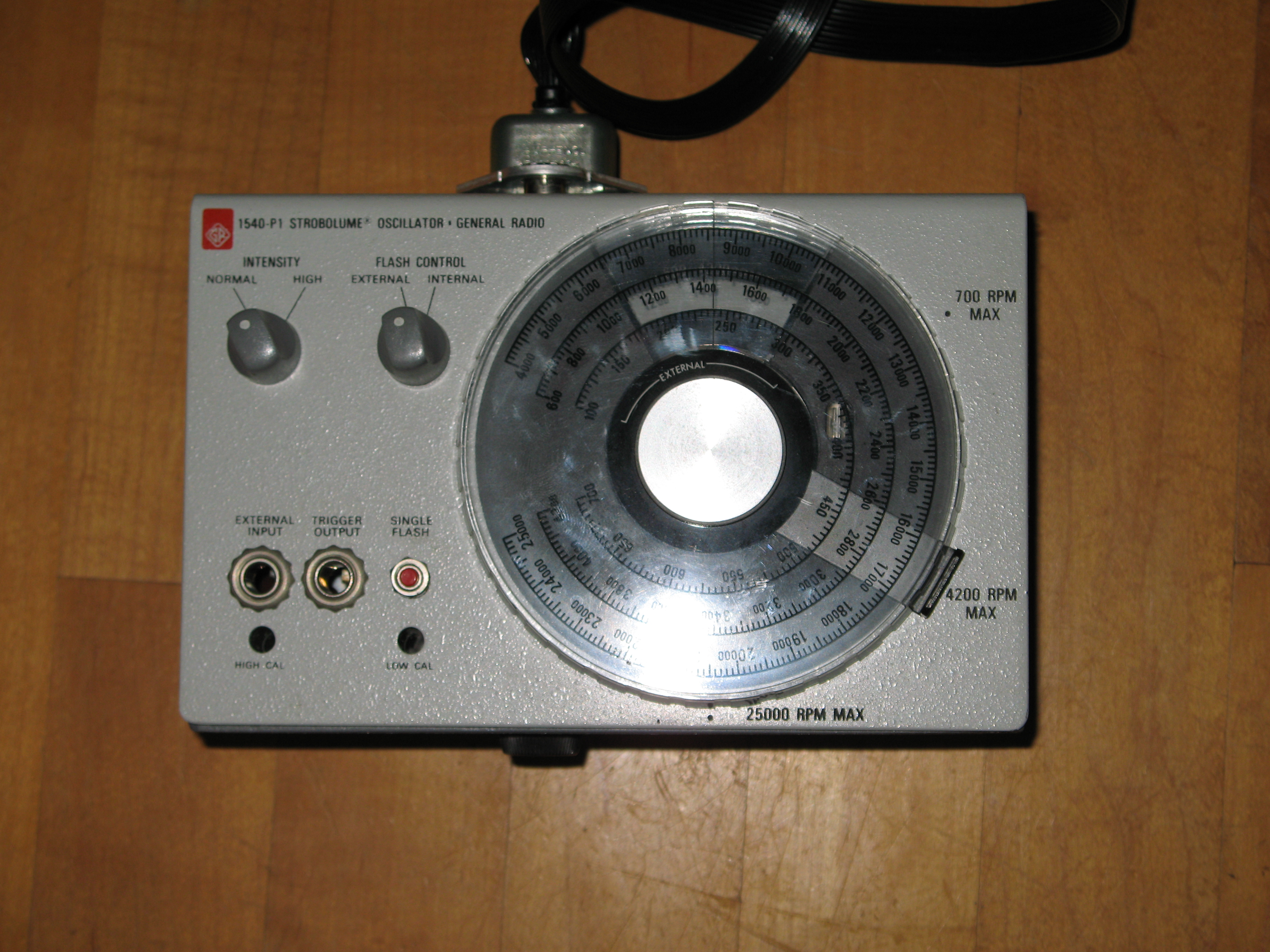
Close-up view of the 1540 Strobolume control box

Joseph Plateau of Belgium is generally credited with the introduction of the stroboscope in 1833, as a fast spinning disc with pictures between radial slits that appear animated when their reflection in a mirror is viewed through the slits. Plateau's device became known as the "Phenakistiscope". There was an almost simultaneous and independent invention of the device by the Austrian Simon Ritter von Stampfer, which he named the "stroboscopische Scheiben", and it is his term which is used today. The etymology is from the Greek words στρόβος - strobos, meaning "whirlpool" and σκοπεῖν - skopein, meaning "to look at".

Besides the popular success of optical toys as methods for producing moving pictures (see also: zoetrope and flip book) that eventually lead to the development of cinematography, publications by Plateau and Stampfer also inspired early pioneers to employ for instance rotating mirrors, or vibrating mirrors known as mirror galvanometers.{citation needed}

In 1917, French engineer Etienne Oehmichen patented the first electric stroboscope, building at the same time a camera capable of shooting 1,000 frames per second.

Harold Eugene Edgerton ("Doc" Edgerton) employed a flashing lamp to study machine parts in motion. General Radio Corporation then went on to produce this device in the form of their "Strobotac", an early example of a commercially successful stroboscope. Edgerton later used very short flashes of light as a means of producing still photographs of fast-moving objects, such as bullets in flight.

== Applications ==
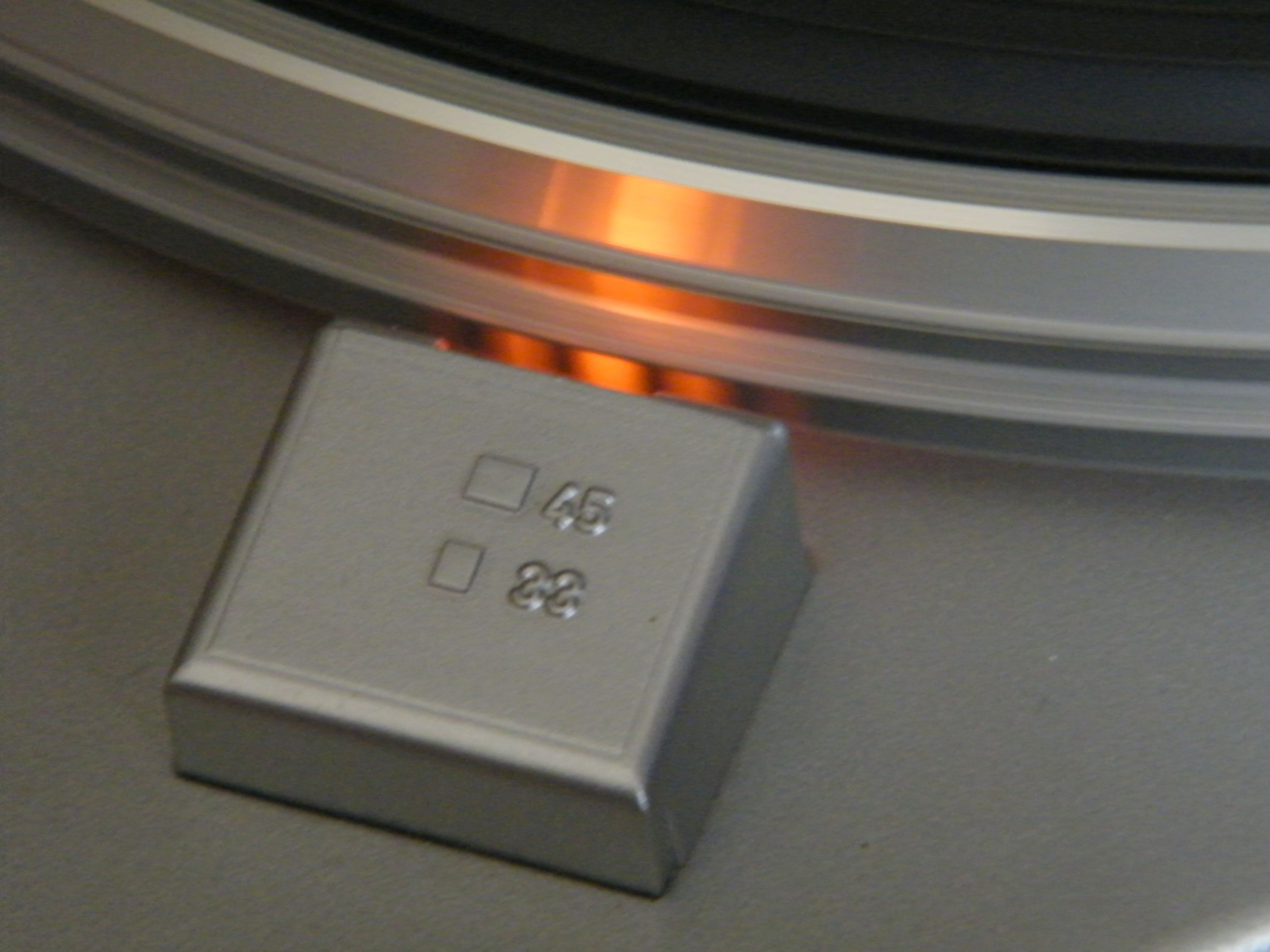
Stroboscope on a gramophone turntable

Stroboscopes play an important role in the study of stresses on machinery in motion, and in many other forms of research. Bright stroboscopes are able to overpower ambient lighting and make stop-motion effects apparent without the need for dark ambient operating conditions.

They are also used as measuring instruments for determining cyclic speed. As a timing light they are used to set the ignition timing of internal combustion engines.

In medicine, stroboscopes are used to view the vocal cords for the diagnosis of conditions that have produced dysphonia (hoarseness). The patient hums or speaks into a microphone which in turn activates the stroboscope at either the same or a slightly different frequency. The light source and a camera are positioned by endoscopy.

Another application of the stroboscope can be seen on many gramophone turntables. The edge of the platter has marks at specific intervals so that when viewed under fluorescent lighting powered at mains frequency, provided the platter is rotating at the correct speed, the marks appear to be stationary. This will not work well under incandescent lighting, as incandescent bulbs do not significantly strobe. For this reason, some turntables have a neon bulb or LED next to the platter. The LED must be driven by a half wave rectifier from the mains transformer, or by an oscillator.

Flashing lamp strobes have also been adapted as a lighting effect for discotheques and night clubs where they give the impression of dancing in slow motion. The strobe rate of these devices is typically not very precise or very fast, because entertainment applications do not usually require a high degree of performance.

== Fechner color ==
Rapid flashing of the stroboscopic light can give the illusion that white light is tinged with color, known as Fechner color. Within certain ranges, the apparent color can be controlled by the frequency of the flash. Effective stimuli frequencies go from 3 Hz upwards, with optimal frequencies of about 4–6 Hz. The colours are an illusion generated in the mind of the observer and not a real color. The Benham's top demonstrates the effect.

== See also ==
- Electrotachyscope
- Flip book
- Reciprocating motion
- Phenakistoscope
- Praxinoscope
- Strobe light
- Strobe tuner
- Tachometer
- Thaumatrope
- Zoetrope
