= Ford 2GA =

Overview
- Production: 1942

Body and chassis
- Body style: 2-door coupe; 2-door sedan; 4-door sedan; 5-door station wagon
- Layout: Front-engine, rear-wheel-drive
- Doors: 2, 4, or 5

Powertrain
- Engine: 90 hp (67 kW) sidevalve inline-six
- Capacity: 3.7 liters (230 cu in)
- Transmission: 3-speed manual

Dimensions
- Wheelbase: 114 in (2,900 mm)
- Length: 194.3 in (4,936 mm)
- Width: 73.1 in (1,857 mm)
- Height: 67.7 in (1,719 mm)
- Curb weight: 3,093 lb (1,403 kg)

The Ford 2GA is a car produced by Ford exclusively in 1942. It was available as a 2-door coupe, 2- or 4-door sedan, and a 5-door station wagon, all with a 90 hp (67 kW), 6-cylinder engine. 160,211 units were produced.

== Specifications ==
- Bore and stroke: 3.3 in × 4.4 in (8.4 cm × 11.2 cm)
- Max brake: 90 hp (67 kW) at 3300 rpm
- Spark plug type: z-10
- Spark plug gap: .30
- Pnt. gap: .15
- Fire order: 1-5-3-6-2-4
- Electrical: +/- 6 volts
