= Valve timing =

Timing of valve closing in engines

In a piston engine, the valve timing is the precise timing of the opening and closing of the valves. In an internal combustion engine those are usually poppet valves and in a steam engine they are usually slide valves or piston valves.

== Internal combustion engines ==
=== Camshaft ===
In four-stroke cycle engines and some two-stroke cycle engines, the valve timing is controlled by the camshaft. It can be varied by modifying the camshaft, or it can be varied during engine operation by variable valve timing. It is also affected by the adjustment of the valve mechanism, and particularly by the tappet clearance. However, this variation is normally unwanted.

=== Valve overlap ===
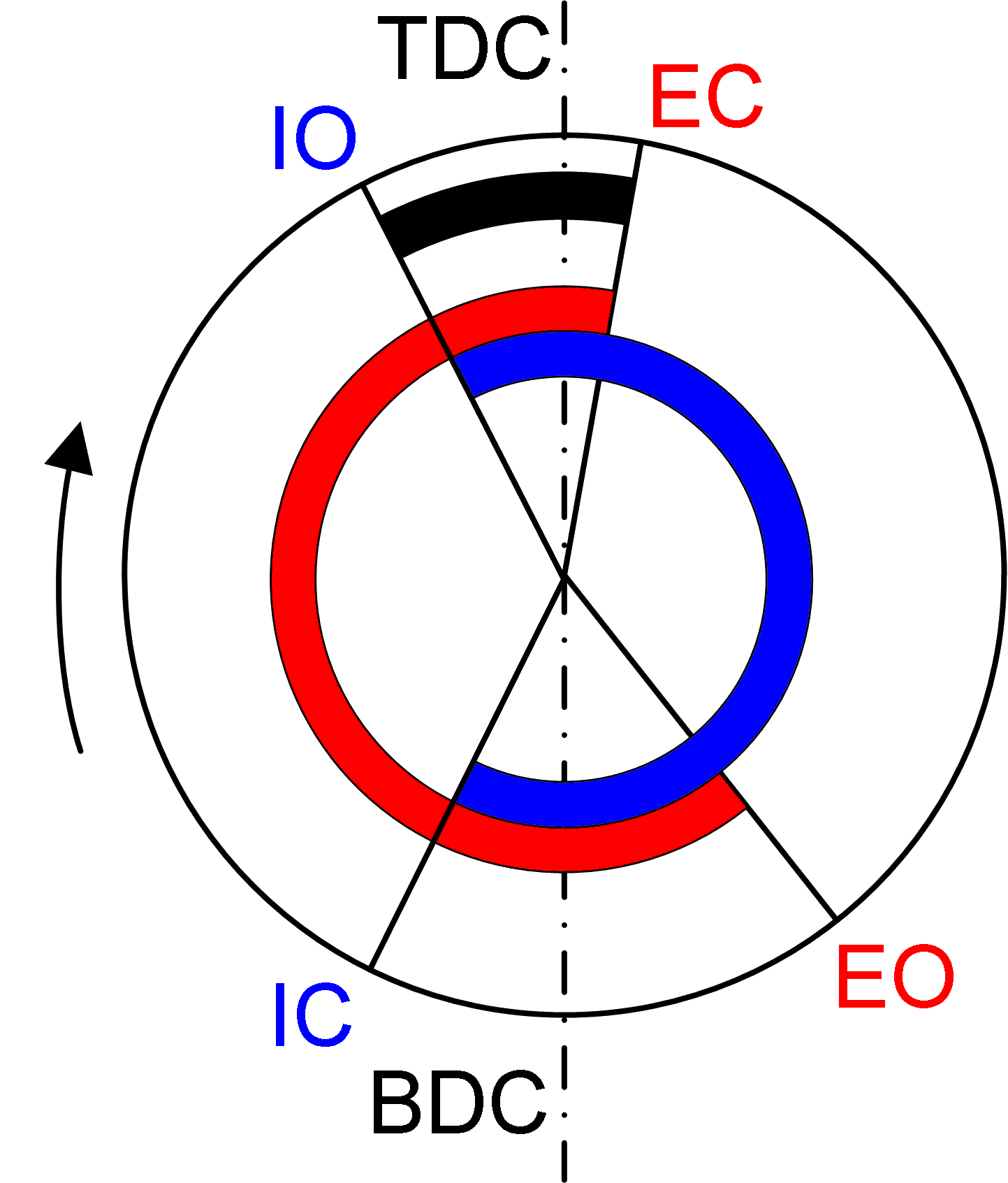
Valve timing diagram for a 4-stroke engine

With traditional fixed valve timing, an engine will have a period of "valve overlap" at the end of the exhaust stroke, when both the intake and exhaust valves are open. The intake valve is opened before the exhaust gases have completely left the cylinder, and their considerable velocity assists in drawing in the fresh charge. Engine designers aim to close the exhaust valve just as the fresh charge from the intake valve reaches it, to prevent either loss of fresh charge or unscavenged exhaust gas. In the diagram, the valve overlap periods are indicated by the overlap of the red and blue arcs.

Key:

- TDC = Top dead centre
- BDC = Bottom dead centre
- IO = Inlet valve opens
- IC = Inlet valve closes
- EO = Exhaust valve opens
- EC = Exhaust valve closes

Either valve opens before the piston head reaches top dead centre or bottom dead centre. The amount in crankshaft degrees by which the valves open before top dead centre or bottom dead centre is reached is known as valve lead. The amount in crankshaft by which the valves close after top dead centre or bottom dead centre is reached is known as valve lag. Valve overlap is a secondary means to cool exhaust valves with intake air during valve overlap. Primary cooling is accomplished by dissipating heat to the valve seats.

=== Variable valve timing ===
Engines that always run at a relatively high speed, such as race car engines, will have considerable overlap in their valve timings for maximum volumetric efficiency. Road car engines are different because they are required to idle at less than 1000rpm, and excessive valve overlap would make smooth idling impossible because of the mixing of fresh and exhaust gases. Variable valve timing can give both maximum power at high rpm and smooth idling at low rpm by making small changes to the relative angular position of the camshafts and thereby varying the valve overlap.

=== Ported engines ===
Two-Stroke engine showing ports in the cylinder walls. The timing cannot be varied.

Many two-stroke cycle and all wankel engines do not have a camshaft or valves, and the port timing can only be varied by machining the ports, and/or modifying the piston skirt (two-stroke applications). However, some supercharged two-stroke diesel engines (such as the Wilksch aero-engine) do have a cylinder head and poppet valves, similar to a four-stroke cycle engine.

==== Tappet clearance ====
The valve timing of a diesel engine also depends on tappet clearance of the inlet and exhaust valves.

If tappet clearance is less, then valve will open early and close late. If tappet clearance is more, then valve will open late and close early. Tappet clearance is measured by an instrument called feeler gauge.

== External combustion engines ==
In an external combustion engine, such as a steam engine, the control of the valve timing is by the valve gear. In a typical piston valve arrangement, the timing of the intake and exhaust events for each cylinder are inextricably related as they are governed by the movement of a single piston uncovering two ports. However, the duration of the intake event can be controlled (the "cut-off") using the reversing gear and this reduces steam usage under cruising conditions.

Caprotti valve gear is more closely related to that of an internal combustion engine, uses poppet valves, and was developed to allow independent timing of the intake and exhaust events. It was never used as widely as piston valves or the earlier slide valves.

== See also ==
- Cylinder head porting
- Valve gear
