= Timing light =

Visual indicator of engine timing

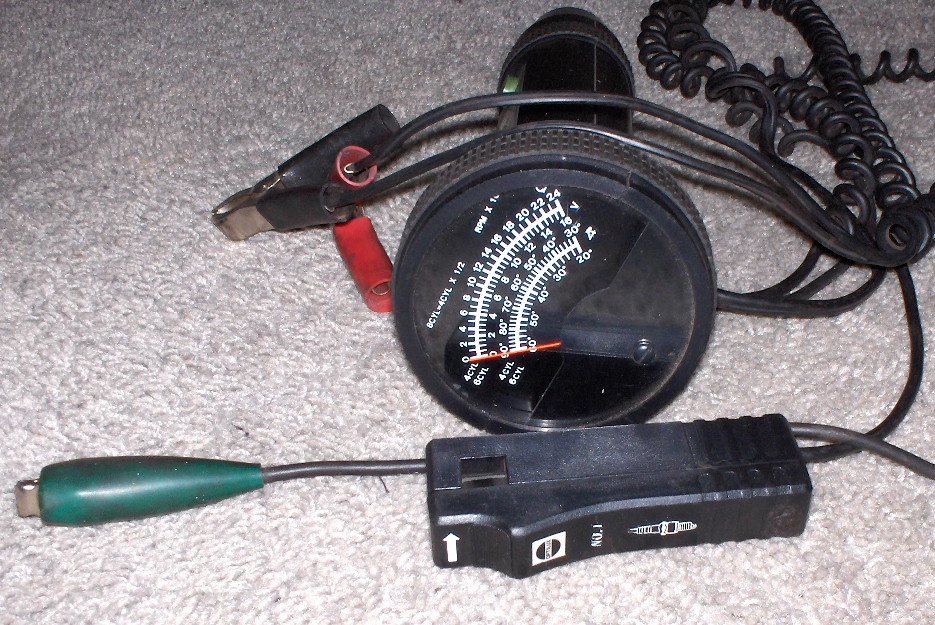
Timing light, combination instrument with RPM, volt meter and dwell angle meter. The actual light is on the far end. The black clamp connects to the battery -, the red clamp to +, the green one to the breaker side of the coil (for RPM), the big black clamp in the foreground is an inductive pick-up that clamps around a spark plug wire.

A timing light is a stroboscope used to dynamically set the ignition timing of an Otto cycle or similar internal combustion engine equipped with a distributor. Modern electronically controlled passenger vehicle engines require use of a scan tool to display ignition timing.

The timing light is connected to the ignition circuit and used to illuminate the timing marks on the engine's crankshaft pulley or flywheel, with the engine running. The apparent position of the marks, frozen by the stroboscopic effect, indicates the current timing of the spark in relation to piston position. A reference pointer is attached to the flywheel housing or other fixed point, and an engraved scale gives the offset between the spark time and the top dead centre position of the piston in the cylinder. The distributor can be rotated slightly until the reference pointer aligns with the specified point on the timing scale.

Fuel-injected engines, or engines with microprocessor controls may require special procedures to allow basic spark timing to be observed without control effects from the engine computer. On most automotive engines, the timing is set based on the #1 cylinder. In few cases an engine is timed off another cylinder, such as the International Harvester V8 engines, which use #8, and the Isuzu 4Z series four-cylinder, which is timed off the #4 cylinder, or the 3 cylinder Saab two-stroke engine which is timed on the middle (#2) cylinder.

Simple timing lights may just contain a neon lamp operated by the energy provided by the ignition circuit. Timing lights using xenon strobe lamps electronically triggered by the spark provide brighter light, allowing use of the timing lamp under normal shop lighting or daylight conditions.

A timing light may be a self-contained instrument, but is sometimes combined with a voltmeter, RPM meter, and a dwell angle meter, or may be incorporated into a more comprehensive instrument such as an engine analyser. Self-contained units used to time automotive engines have an inductive pickup that clamps around the proper spark plug wire and serves as the trigger for the strobe. Power for the strobe comes directly from the vehicle's battery. Some older timing lights require the removal of the spark plug boot in order to attach a direct pickup between the wire's terminal and the centre conductor of the spark plug.

== See also ==
- Firing order
