= Trigger transformer =

Type of electrical transformer

A trigger transformer is a small, usually ferrite cored transformer or autotransformer used in applications requiring a high voltage pulse, typically to start ionization of a gas to allow a current to pass.

== Uses ==
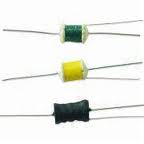
Various small trigger transformers. The primary coil is connected to the 2 axial leads out either side, and the high voltage is delivered through the smaller lead, and one of the primary leads.

Trigger transformer cores may be utilized in a unipolar (electromagnetic flux strictly positive or negative) or bipolar (swinging between positive and negative) manner. Applications also differ in whether or not they saturate the core (termed a saturating trigger transformer).

Strobe lights, for instance operate the core in a unipolar, unsaturated mode. Capacitors are charged to approx. 300 volts, at which point a second capacitor pulses voltage through the transformer, achieving the approx. 2000–6000 volts (depending upon the characteristics of the specific flash tube) necessary to overcome the resistance of the inert gas (such as xenon) between the electrodes, ionizing it.

Trigger transformers operate by means of a secondary coil with hundreds, even thousands, of turns of very fine copper wire, trading current for voltage.

Much like in lightning, this plasma has much lower resistance, and the capacitor can discharge rapidly across it. The capacitors begin charging again, starting the cycle anew and giving rise to their characteristic periodic flashing. Capacitors alone would result in a continuous arc. Having achieved the voltage necessary to cause dielectric breakdown, they would maintain it indefinitely.

So-called saturating trigger transformers find use in circuits that intentionally utilize core saturation and/or operate in a bipolar fashion, such as DC-to-AC power inverters.

Inductors are also commonly used in place of a trigger transformer, however are not considered transformers themselves, although similar in operation.
