= Dead centre (engineering) =

Positions of an engine's piston at the top or bottom of its stroke

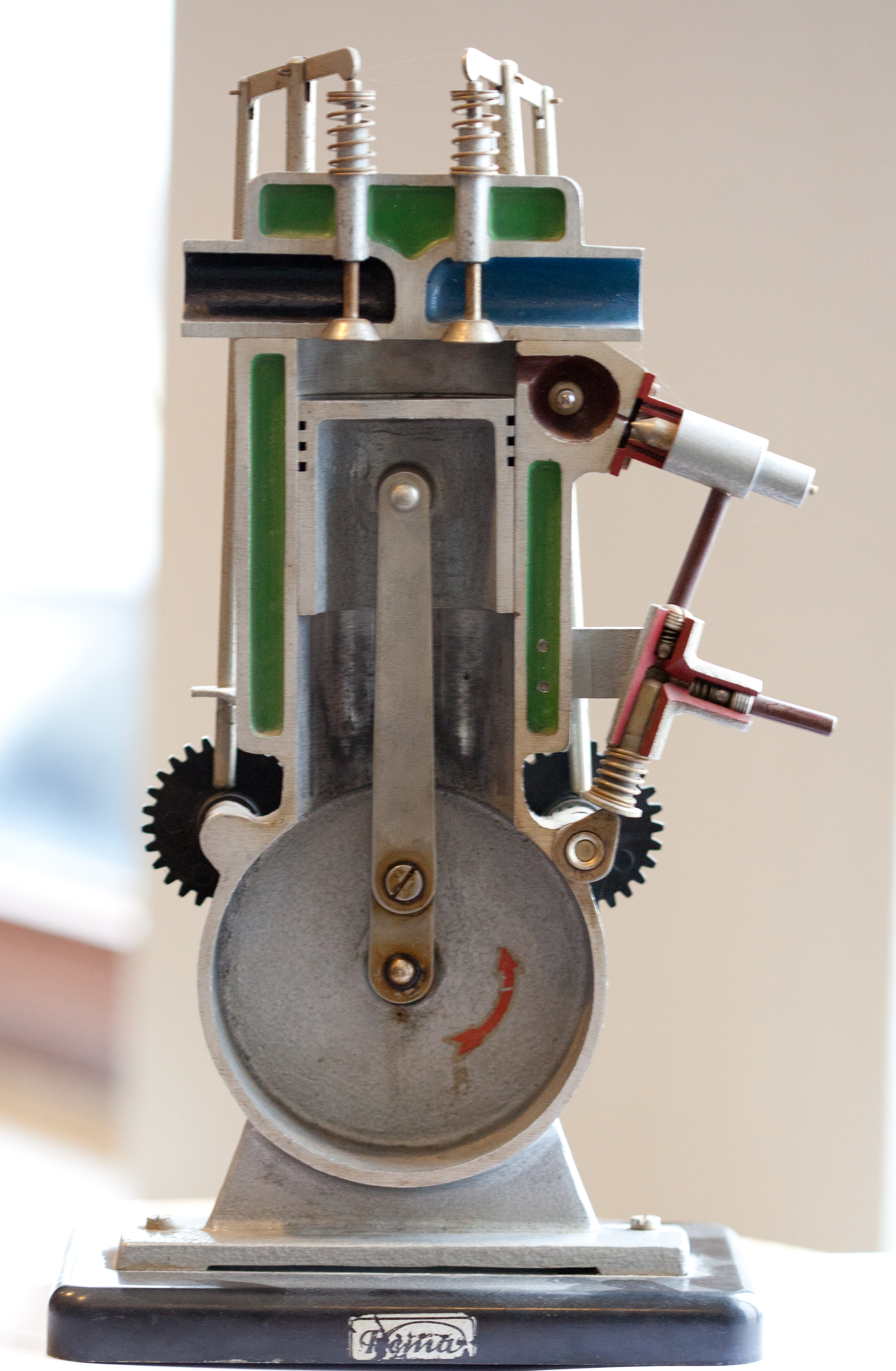
Top dead centre

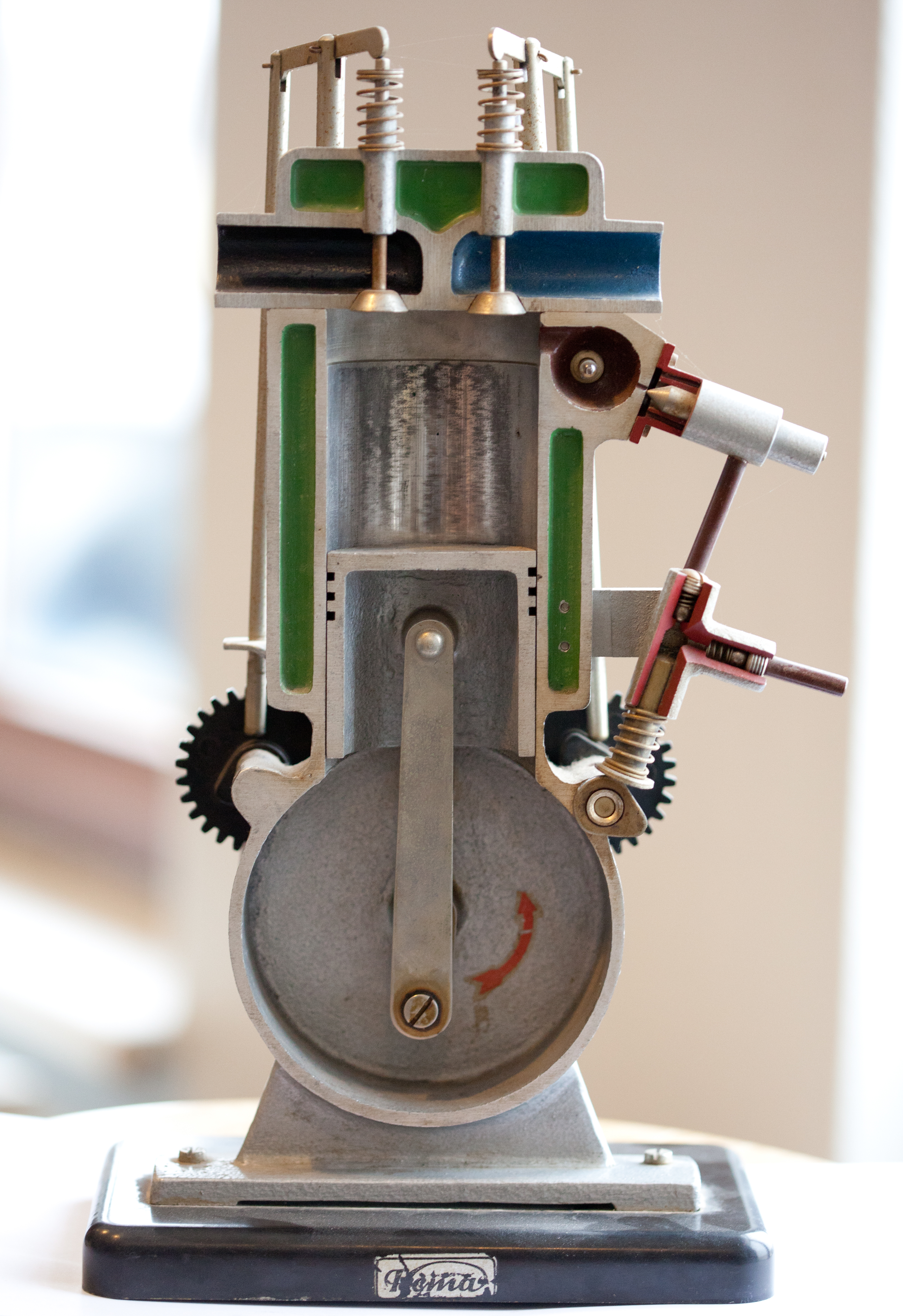
Bottom dead centre

Dead centres of a cutaway model

In a reciprocating engine, the dead centre is the position of a piston in which it is either furthest from, or nearest to, the crankshaft. The former is known as top dead centre (TDC) while the latter is known as bottom dead centre (BDC).

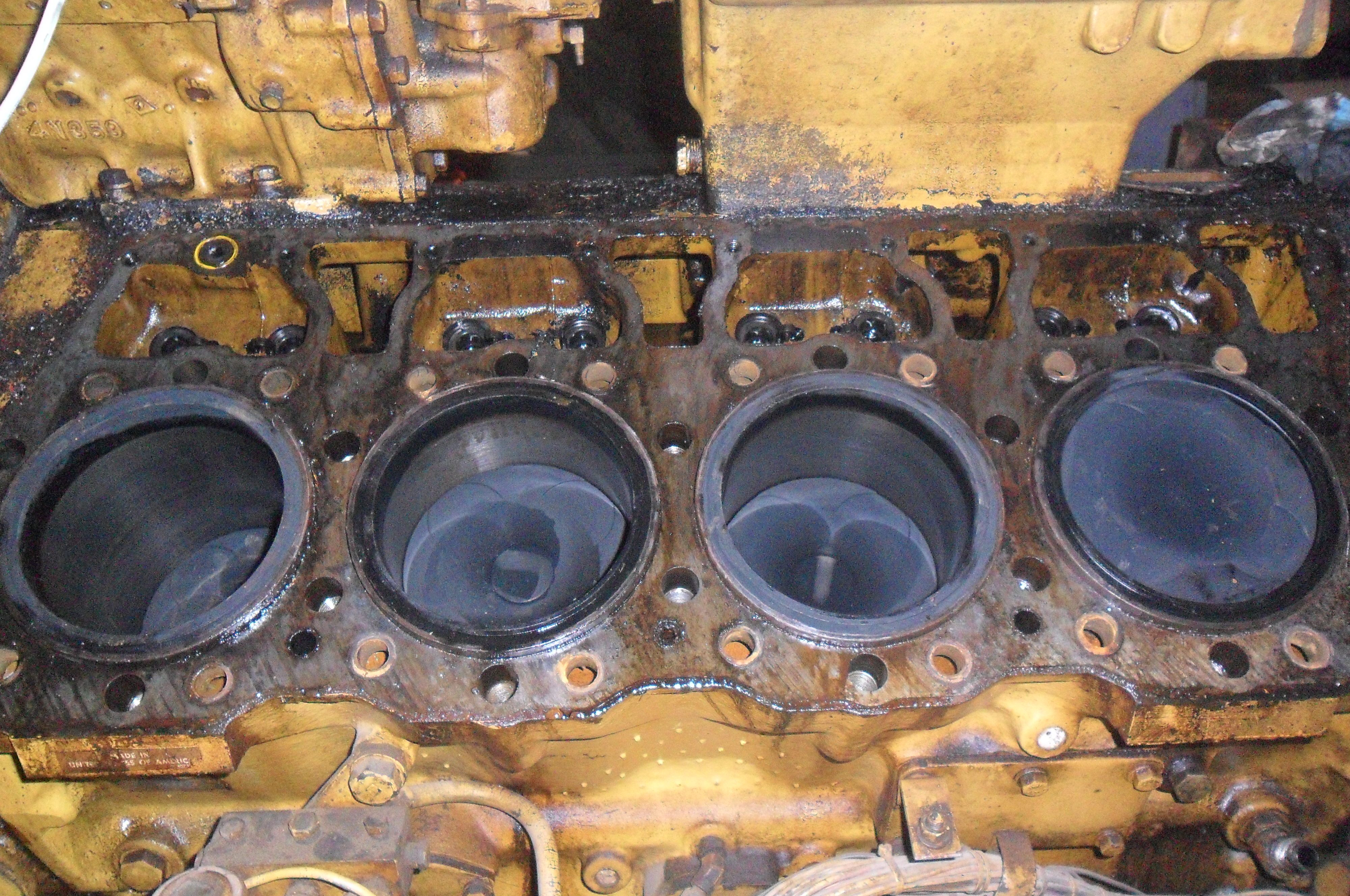
Position of pistons

More generally, the dead centre is any position of a crank where the applied force is straight along its axis, meaning no turning force can be applied. Many sorts of machines are crank driven, including unicycles, bicycles, tricycles, various types of machine presses, gasoline engines, diesel engines, steam locomotives, and other steam engines. Crank-driven machines rely on the energy stored in a flywheel to overcome the dead centre, or are designed, in the case of multi-cylinder engines, so that dead centres can never exist on all cranks at the same time. A steam locomotive is an example of the latter, the connecting rods being arranged such that the dead centre for each cylinder occurs out of phase with the other one (or more) cylinders.

== Bicycles ==
Bicycle cranks have dead centres at approximately 12 o'clock and 6 o'clock where simple pushing down of the pedal will not turn the chainwheel, but the rider's leg can apply tangential force at the pedal to overcome it. Fixed-gear bicycles (without a freehub) use the momentum of the bicycle and rider to keep the chainwheel turning even if the rider makes no attempt to pedal in a circular motion.

== Reciprocating engine ==
In a reciprocating engine, top dead centre of piston #1 is the point from which ignition system measurements are made and the firing order is determined. For example, ignition timing is normally specified as degrees of crankshaft rotation before top dead centre (BTDC). A very few small and fast-burning engines require a spark just after top dead centre (ATDC), such as the Nissan MA engine with hemispherical combustions, or hydrogen engines.

Top dead centre for cylinder one is often marked on the crankshaft pulley, the flywheel or harmonic balancer or both, with adjacent timing marks showing the recommended ignition timing settings as decided during engine development. The timing marks can be used to set the ignition timing either statically by hand or dynamically using a timing light, by rotating the distributor in its seat.

Animation of a straight-4 4-stroke engine with pairs 180° out of phase

In a multi-cylinder engine, pistons may reach top dead centre simultaneously or at different times depending on the engine configuration. For example:

- In the V-twin configuration, the two pistons reach TDC at different times, equal to the angular displacement between the cylinders.
- In the flat twin configuration, two opposing pistons reach TDC simultaneously, which is also called 0° displacement, but one piston will be at TDC of the compression stroke, the other on TDC of the exhaust stroke.
- In the straight-4 configuration, the two end pistons (pistons 1 and 4) reach TDC simultaneously, as do the two centre pistons (pistons 2 and 3), but these two pairs reach TDC with an angular displacement of 180°. Similar patterns are found in almost all straight engines with even numbers of cylinders, with the two end pistons and two middle pistons moving together (not necessarily 180° out of phase however) and the intermediate pistons moving in pairs in mirror-image around the centre of the engine.
- In the flatplane V8 and many larger V engines, the piston motion within each bank is similar to that of a straight engine, however in the crossplane V8 and all V10 engines the motion is far more complex.

The concept of top dead centre is also extended to pistonless rotary engines, and means the point in the cycle in which the volume of a combustion chamber is smallest. This typically occurs several times per rotor revolution. In the Wankel engine for example, it occurs three times for every one revolution of the rotor (although only once per revolution of the engine output shaft, since the output rotates at three times the speed of the rotor).

Finding the volume of the cylinder using TDC and BDC and multiplying it by the number of cylinders will give the engine displacement.

== Steam engines ==
As steam engines are commonly horizontal, the relevant terms are front dead centre and back dead centre rather than "top" and "bottom".

If a single-cylinder steam engine stops in either of the dead centre positions, it must be moved off the dead centre before it will restart. In small engines, this is done by turning the flywheel by hand. In large engines, the flywheel is moved with a lever or "turning bar". Both operations must be done with care to avoid the operator becoming entangled in the machinery. Even larger engines might require the use of a barring engine.

Steam locomotives normally have at least two double acting cylinders, which enables the cranks to be set so that at least one piston will always be off the dead centre and no starting assistance is required. In the common case of a two piston locomotive, the cranks are set at right angles, so that whenever one piston is at dead centre the other is in mid-stroke, and giving four equally spaced power strokes per revolution.

== Other machines ==
This term is also used in the realm of production equipment. A mechanical punch press employs a crankshaft similar to that found in an engine. In the punch press, the crankshaft drives a ram that when it is furthest away from the platen of the press is deemed to be in the position of top dead centre.

== See also ==
The dictionary definition of top dead center at Wiktionary
