= Wilksch Airmotive =

British compression-ignition engine manufacturer

Wilksch Airmotive Ltd company logo

Wilksch Airmotive Ltd is a UK-based company which designs and manufactures compression-ignition engines for light aircraft. Wilksch engines run on jet fuel, which is cheaper and more widely available than avgas. The company, founded in 1994, manufactures two-stroke compression ignition engines. In a maiden flight in a Piper J-3 Cub on 21 November 1997, an 80-horsepower 2-cylinder prototype engine became the first two-stroke diesel aircraft engine to fly in over 50 years.

The company then concentrated on developing a three-cylinder 120 hp WAM engine, which first flew in December 1999. In 2005 the Wilksch company announced a manufacturing deal with Lister Petter — effectively the WAM (Wilksch Air Motive) company would lease space, but would actually manufacture at the Lister Petter factory in Gloucestershire, UK. In the following 18 months from 2004 some 40 engines were made; to date it is believed that about 20 have flown in kit built aircraft in places as far apart as Brazil, the United States, Sweden, Germany, France and the UK.

In 2004 Mark Wilksch raised part equity and part loan investment in Wilksch Airmotive from an investor group consisting of Mike Newton, Patrick Head and John Murray.

By 2006 the company faced serious and critical financial difficulties. There was further investment by prior shareholders, and the Investor Group exercised their options to convert loans to equity at a reduced price based on financial performance to date.

Headed by Mike Newton, albeit in a Non Exec director role on behalf of the Investor Group, the Company continued to work on correcting the defects and refining the Indirect Injection (IDI) versions of the "WAM" engine while Mark Wilksch separately concentrated on Direct Injection (DI) concepts.

Wilksch Airmotive moved into custom built premises at Gloucestershire Airport in 2009, following temporary accommodation on the site where they continued to develop their diesel engines. New test cells were commissioned in portable containerized form, in which they run the engines to JAR, FAR and ASTM cycles. WAM moved to a low volume production regime of the existing design and returned to development with the aim of creating the next generation of engines, namely a larger capacity version of the three-cylinder engine and (in due course) a four-cylinder version.

A revised version of the original engine was released as the WAM100-LSA targeted at LSA aircraft at 100HP. By early 2008 the WAM100-LSA had completed the required ASTM F2538 test cycles and subsequent inspections for 1,000hr TBO with the performance testing already complete to achieve a 2000Hr TBO. It was clear however that the original power targets could not be achieved without fundamental design changes.

During 2008, development of the WAM125BB and projected WAM167BB commenced. This incorporated the following changes -

1. Lower cost / easier to manufacture ‘conventional’ connecting rod
2. Revised piston with conventional little end pin
3. Increased bore
4. Increased Stroke
5. Reduced BMEP (i.e. rating or stress)
6. Alternative pre-combustion chambers to remove any inherent failure mode in the previous design, and also improving combustion efficiency for improved SFC.

By the end of 2012, the WAM125BB had completed over 2000hrs of JAR and FAR Endurance test cycles on the dyno - supporting a deliverable 2000hr TBO certified engine target under either FAA or EASA rules. The prototype WAM167BB four cylinder engine was also in the initial stages of manufacture, with two prototypes subsequently running on the dyno and performing well within target expectations. Both WAM125BB and WAM167BB engines delivered improved SFC and reduced noise and vibration in addition to the improved durability.

However despite the significant further investment to this stage the market position for JET-A1 fuelled light aircraft had changed, and there was little appetite at that time for the further investment to perform certification and series production.

In 2018, as exploration for alternative investment opportunities had been exhausted, Mike Newton announced the acquisition of the assets into his specialist engineering company, Apple Tree Innovation Ltd and the relocation of the assets to Cheshire, and as of late 2019 the facilities have been partly recommissioned, with agreement with a local engine specialist for ongoing support if required for engine manufacture or rebuilds. Apple Tree Innovation continue to make parts available for existing WAM Engine customers.

Apple Tree Innovation continues to review market opportunities, including the 'single fuel' UAV sector, and also investigating potential hybrid versions leveraging the automotive EV developments also within Apple Tree, with research into counter rotating independent propellers solutions sponsored at MACE ( School of Mechanical, Aerospace and Civil Engineering, University of Manchester ).

A recent article in Unmanned Systems Technology Magazine described the engine targeted for UAV applications.
