= GY6 engine =

Four-stroke single-cylinder motorcycle engine

The GY6 engine design is a four-stroke single-cylinder in a near-horizontal orientation that is used on a number of small motorcycles or scooters made in Taiwan, China, and other southeast Asian countries. It has since become a generic technology. Kymco went on to produce Honda clones such as the Pulsar (CB125), made to Honda standards, as part of their range.

Honda's KCW125 (the commercial name in Japan is "Spacy") was modified by Taiwan's Kwang Yang Motor Co., Ltd. (KYMCO), under Honda's consultancy, and became a standard model called the GY6, which various Taiwan makers imitated and minor-changed. Apparently, vehicles of this model were imported from Taiwan by various manufacturers and traders, and spread mainly in the southern coastal regions of China.

== Configuration ==
The GY6 single is forced-air-cooled, with a chain-driven overhead camshaft and a crossflow hemi cylinder head. Fuel metering is by a single constant-velocity style sidedraft carburetor, typically a Keihin CVK clone or similar.

The 50cc Version of the GY6 comes in 2 configurations, the 139QMA and the 139QMB, there are no real differences in the engines apart from the length of the CVT housing, on the 139QMB the CVT housing is shorter and the 139QMA has a longer CVT housing. To comply with Euro 4 specifications, most GY6 engines came with Electronic Fuel Injection, an Oxygen sensor and a Delphi Replica ECU. Euro 5 specification 139QMA/B Engines are fitted with Exhaust gas recirculation systems, utilising a charcoal canister fed directly into the intake pipe.

The 125cc Version of the GY6 holds the engine code 152QMI/J. The engine has 2 variations - A short (I) and Long (J) CVT housing, just like the 139QMA/B engines. The short CVT housing version utilises a 125cc cylinder only, whereas the longer housing version utilises anything from 125cc to a big bore kit up to 230cc. The 152QMI/J use a 24mm PWK clone carburettor as standard with a CDI. In Post Euro 4 Specifications, a 24mm Throttle body and fuel injector controlled by a Delphi Clone ECU are used, with the manifold pressure rated to 1.05 bar and a 3 bar fuel system.

Ignition is by capacitor discharge ignition (CDI), with a magnetic trigger on the flywheel. Because the trigger is on the flywheel instead of the camshaft, the ignition will fire on both the compression and exhaust strokes, making it a wasted spark ignition. An integrated magneto provides 50 V AC power for the CDI system and 20-30 V AC rectified and regulated to 12 V DC for chassis accessories such as lighting and to charge a battery.

It includes an integrated swingarm, which houses a centrifugally-controlled continuously variable transmission (CVT) using a rubber belt sometimes called a VDP. The engine produced around 20hp and 32nm of torque in its biggest state (230cc). An electric starter, backup kick-starter, and rear brake hardware is also housed in the swing arm.
