= Wilksch WAM series =

Light aircraft engines

- Type: Diesel piston aero engine
- National origin: United Kingdom
- Manufacturer: Wilksch Airmotive

The Wilksch WAM series is a family of aero-engines for light and general aviation aircraft. WAM series engines are produced by Wilksch Airmotive in Gloucestershire, England. The engine outputs range between 100 hp (75 kW) and 190 hp (142 kW), and are suitable for both tractor and pusher configurations. Initially intended for homebuilt aircraft, the WAM engines may become certified for use on factory-built aircraft.

Wilksch engines are compression ignition engines which burn diesel fuel or jet fuel. Aero-diesels are more efficient than the avgas engines more commonly found in general aviation aircraft. Kerosene jet fuel is ideal for jet turbines, but it lacks the lubricity of diesel fuel. Accordingly, diesel aero-engines that use jet fuel must have sufficient lubrication to compensate.

The development team was led by Mark Wilksch, and analytical mechanical engineer. By 2002, the company had received enough orders to go into production. By 2024, continued full production was never achieved, and Wilksch Airmotive provides only customer support and advice.

== Design and development ==
The WAM unit is a direct-drive two-stroke inverted inline triple with wet-sump, liquid cooling, supercharger, turbocharger and intercooler. Compression boost at startup comes via a supercharger, but once the engine is running, a turbocharger provides additional boost. Being inverted, the engine has its crankshaft at the top directly driving the propeller, and a camshaft at the bottom, immersed in sump oil. Charged air for combustion is introduced under pressure through a gallery of small ports, and exhaust gases are later expelled through poppet valves in the cylinder head.

The intake ports are narrow enough to ensure that piston rings do not need to be pegged. Instead of using a gudgeon pin, each piston was connected to its connecting rod via a ball and socket joint, to enable the piston to rotate. However, this feature was abandoned for the Gen-2 version in favour of conventional gudgeon pins.

Fuel is filtered, and then supplied by a high pressure feed, surplus fuel being returned to the tank. The combustion system is IDI (indirect injection), whereby fuel is injected into a prechamber. A system that could be considered old-fashioned, IDI was adopted for its simplicity and robustness. A heavily revised IDI system has been retained for the Gen-2 version.

Initial development was assisted with a UK government (DTI) grant. The prototype was a two-cylinder model capable of 80 hp (60 kW). The three-cylinder WAM120 produced 100–120 hp (75–89 kW), and the factory intended to produce a follow-up four-cylinder 160 hp (119 kW) motor to compete with engines such as the Lycoming O-360. However, funding proved problematic, and it became expedient to extend the product range by developing a larger capacity version of the three-cylinder motor. This iteration has been developed to the point of being production-ready, bettering the previous version's fuel consumption by some 10% and improving all other aspects of performance; this Gen-2 version also promises 50 bhp per cylinder after further durability development, but really needs a production partner to take it forward. The company has also now built and tested a proof-of-concept 4-cylinder Gen-2 engine, which performed as expected, but is also awaiting a development partner.

The testbed aircraft for air trials were a Piper Cub, a Shaw Europa and a Thorp T211. To date, some 20 aircraft have flown with WAM power, and one engine has been installed (in pusher mode) in a Staverton-based Rutan Long-EZ. In July 2009, Liberty Aerospace installed a WAM in the USA-built Liberty XL2 aircraft, and the company has agreed to assist Wilksch Airmotive in obtaining FAA certification for the WAM series. This cooperative effort bodes well for the future of Wilksch Automotive, and is expected to lead to the WAM engine becoming a specified option for the Liberty XL2.

== Variants ==
WAM120 three-cylinder engine
WAM125BB three-cylinder engine
WAM167BB four-cylinder engine

== Applications ==
- Europa XS
- Liberty XL2
- Thorp T211
- Rutan Long-EZ
- Murphy Rebel
- Jodel
- Vans RV-9
- Cozy
- Gaz'aile
- Conquest
- Impulse

== Specifications (WAM120) ==
=== General characteristics ===
- Type: two-stroke inverted inline triple

=== Components ===
- Valvetrain: ohc (exhaust) & peripheral ports (inlet)
- Supercharger: yes
- Turbocharger: yes
- Fuel system: IDI Fuel Injection
- Fuel type: AVTUR or DERV
- Oil system: wet sump
- Cooling system: Liquid-cooled

=== Performance ===
- Power output: 120 hp (89 kW) at 2,700 RPM
- Fuel consumption: xx litres/h at 75% power
- Power-to-weight ratio: xx kW/kg

== See also ==
Comparable engines

- Diesel Air Dair 100
- Jabiru 3300
- Lycoming O-360
- Rotax 914
- ULPower UL260i
- Zoche aero-diesel

Related lists

- List of aircraft engines
