= Wasted spark system =

Ignition system used in some four-stroke cycle internal combustion engines

Ignition system of a flat-twin Citroën 2CV

A wasted spark system is a type of ignition system used in some four-stroke cycle internal combustion engines. In a wasted spark system, the spark plugs fire in pairs, with one plug in a cylinder on its compression stroke and the other plug in a cylinder on its exhaust stroke. The extra spark during the exhaust stroke has no effect and is thus "wasted". This design halves the number of components necessary in a typical ignition system, while the extra spark, against much reduced dielectric resistance, barely impacts the lifespan of modern ignition components. In a typical engine, it requires only about 2–3 kV to fire the cylinder on its exhaust stroke. The remaining coil energy is available to fire the spark plug in the cylinder on its compression stroke (typically about 8 to 12 kV).

== Advantages ==
Perhaps the most significant advantage of the system, compared to a single coil and distributor systems, is that it eliminates the high-tension distributor. This significantly improves reliability, since many problems with a conventional system are caused by the distributor being affected by dampness from rain or condensation, dirt accumulation, and degradation of insulating materials with time. Although plug-top coil systems would later offer this same advantage, they were not available for another 30 years. Plug-top systems increase the number of coils required, increase the heat that these coils must survive and thus require more sophisticated and expensive materials to survive routine usage.

== Timing signal ==
Wasted spark systems still require a timing signal from the crankshaft. In a conventional four-stroke engine, this signal must also observe the phase of the camshaft relative to the crankshaft, so contact breakers are normally driven from the camshaft and distributor drive. With a wasted spark, the crankshaft can be used instead, as the system fires on both upward strokes. It simplifies the mechanical arrangements since there is no distributor drive and the contact breaker cam can be fixed to the crankshaft. Although a 2:1 reduction gear is still required to operate the camshaft and valves, the precision of this drive is now less critical (ignition timing is more critical for engine performance than valve timing): engines continue to run adequately even with worn camshaft drives and imprecise timing.

== Practical examples of 'wasted spark' ==
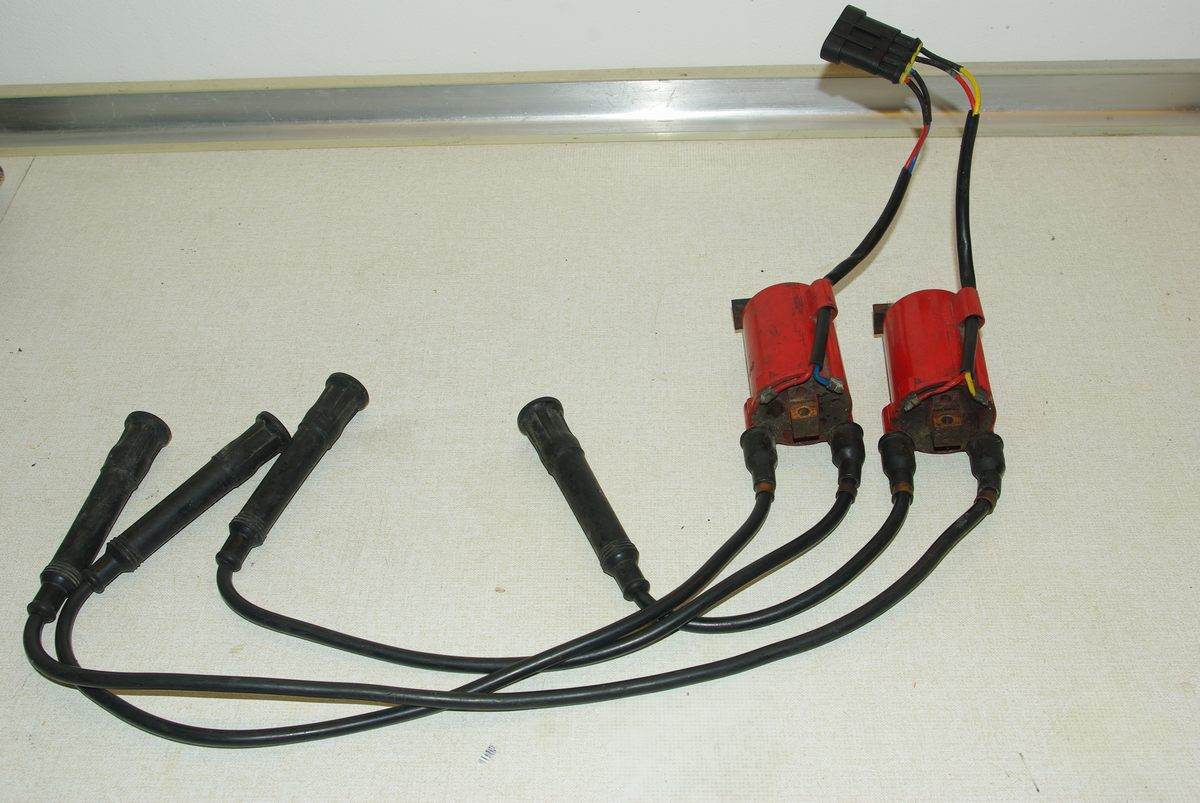
Ignition Coils of a Ford RS1600i

This system has been widely used, including such engines as the MG MG6 1.8T engine; Mitsubishi Evolution 4G63 engine, Fiat 126 engine, Mercedes-Benz inline sixes (M104.94x, M104.98x, M104.99x); Buick 3800 engines (LN3 and newer); Harley-Davidson V-Twin; air-cooled BMW Motorcycles; Citroën 2CV, Mazda B engines; Chrysler V10s; GY6 engine; Volkswagen Golf Mk3 2.8 VR6 (other than 2.0); Saturn Corporation four cylinders; Toyota 5VZ-FE V6s; Toyota 5E-FE and Chrysler 1.8, 2.0 & 2.4 engines. Some Ford engines also do. Many Honda and Kawasaki motorcycle and PWC engines also follow a similar design, to allow for a smaller number of more powerful coils to replace a larger number of smaller coils in the same limited space.

In practical use, a V-6 engine would only need three coil packs instead of six. The coilpack fires the spark plugs in two cylinders simultaneously so for example 1&4/2&5/3&6 cylinders fire together, the spark plug in one cylinder on a compression stroke is where the power comes from, and the spark plug in the other cylinder on an exhaust stroke does nothing. Coils in a wasted spark system may be in pack form, or they may be in Coil-On-Plug (COP) form, with a spark plug cable attached to each COP unit, which connects to another spark plug.

== Single cylinder use ==
Most single cylinder [four-stroke] engines use the wasted spark system in order to capitalise on the simplicity and reliability of the flywheel magneto. These engines need a flywheel to run smoothly, and the heavy current-generating magnets help provide the momentum while delivering a zero-maintenance drive to the ignition system. Bolted to the end of the crankshaft, this flywheel rotates twice for each compression stroke.

As well as the build-weight and maintenance advantages of this system, there is a tuning advantage. Mounted directly on the end of the crankshaft, all the stress that spark generation would otherwise place on the camshaft chain (or another special purpose half-speed drive) is avoided, while there is virtually none of the strain that necessarily degrades the ignition timing in systems relying on chains or gears.

Unlike the multi-cylinder systems noted above (which fire two plugs simultaneously from a double-ended coil) the coil in this system has only a single HT lead running to the single plug. The flywheel magneto provides other services in, for instance, small motorcycles, as it can easily be built to provide direct-current battery-charging power at almost no additional cost or weight.

== Effect on component life ==
In modern conditions, this method has a very small impact on the length on the service intervals of the vehicle and the longevity of individual components. Modern ignition systems do not have breaker points, which have been almost entirely replaced by electronic systems. Modern ignition coils outlast most other components of the vehicle and modern spark plugs have excellent service life, though there is a slight difference between the two plugs as to erosion suffered at the center electrode. Because the spark jumps in opposite directions on the companion plugs, one bank will erode the center electrode more, and the opposite bank will erode the ground electrode more. Spark plugs used in wasted spark systems should have precious metals, such as platinum and/or iridium, on both the central and ground electrodes in order to increase the average service interval time before replacement is needed.

== Twin plug combustion ==
Since the earliest gasoline engines twin spark systems have been used, with two spark plugs for each cylinder. Each set of plugs is supplied separately. Reasons for this include reliability (especially as a failsafe in aircraft engines), for improved starting, and for better combustion performance by initiating the flamefront at opposing points simultaneously (e.g. Alfa Romeo). These are not considered as wasted spark systems since their sparks all take place after the useful compression stroke rather than "wasted" in the exhaust stroke.
