= Ignition system =

Electric spark system to ignite a fuel-air mixture

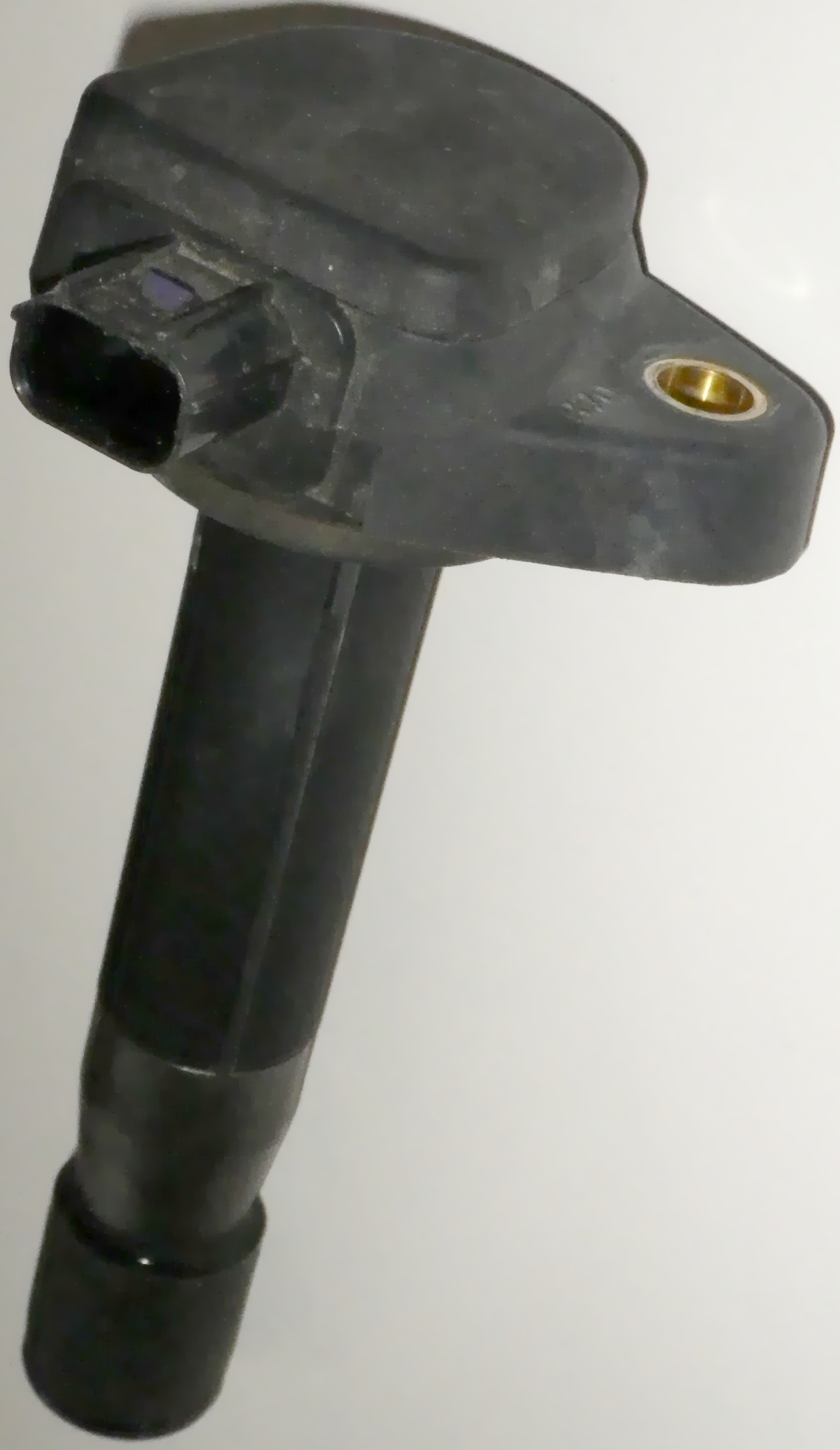
Coil-on-plug ignition device

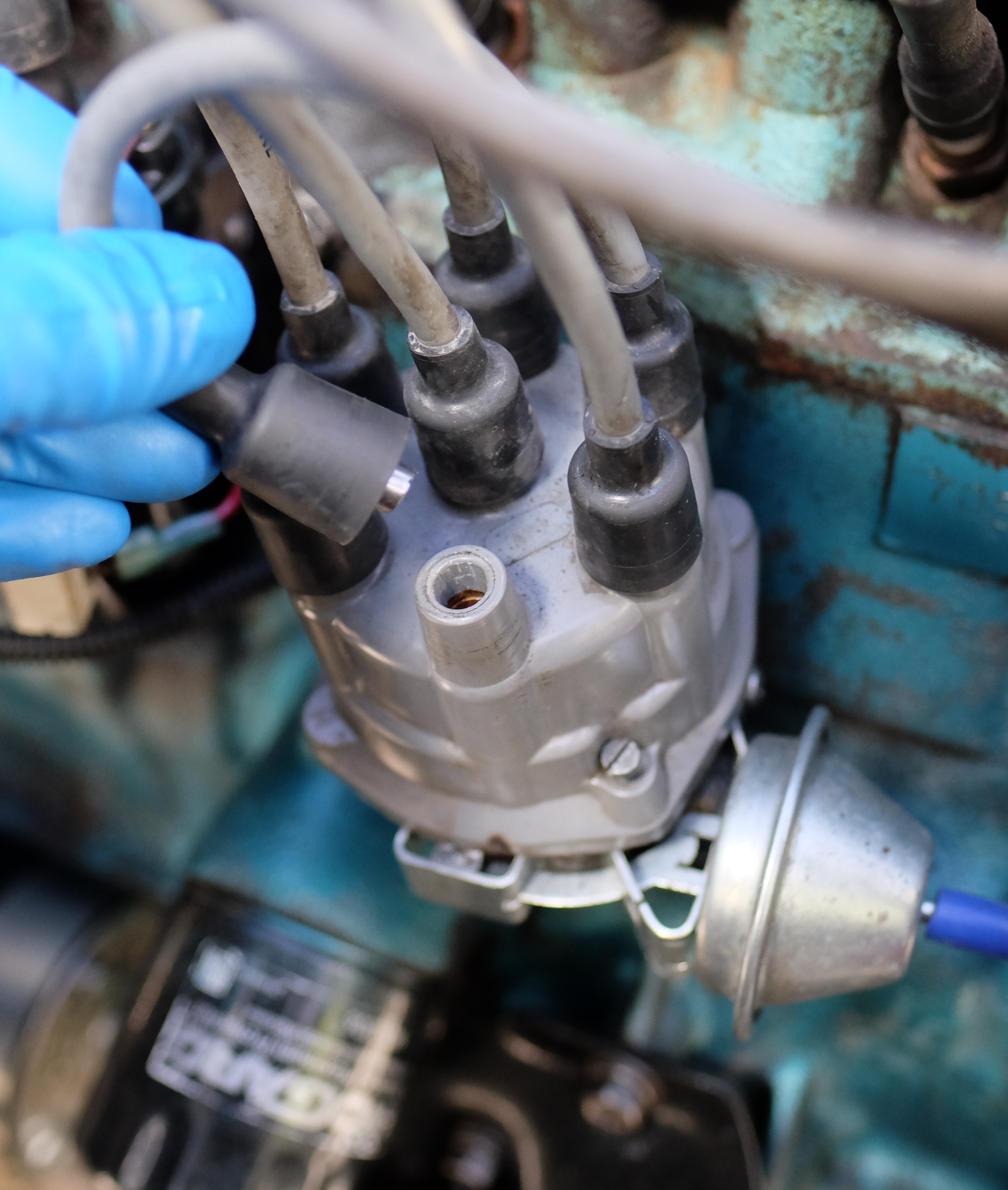
Distributor cap

Ignition systems are used by heat engines to initiate combustion by igniting the fuel-air mixture. In a spark ignition versions of the internal combustion engine (such as petrol engines), the ignition system creates a spark to ignite the fuel-air mixture just before each combustion stroke. Gas turbine engines and rocket engines normally use an ignition system only during start-up.

Diesel engines use compression ignition to ignite the fuel-air mixture using the heat of compression and therefore do not use an ignition system. They usually have glowplugs that preheat the combustion chamber to aid starting in cold weather.

Early cars used ignition magneto and trembler coil systems, which were superseded by Distributor-based systems (first used in 1912). Electronic ignition systems (first used in 1968) became common towards the end of the 20th century, with coil-on-plug versions of these systems becoming widespread since the 1990s.

== Magneto and mechanical systems ==
=== Ignition magneto systems ===
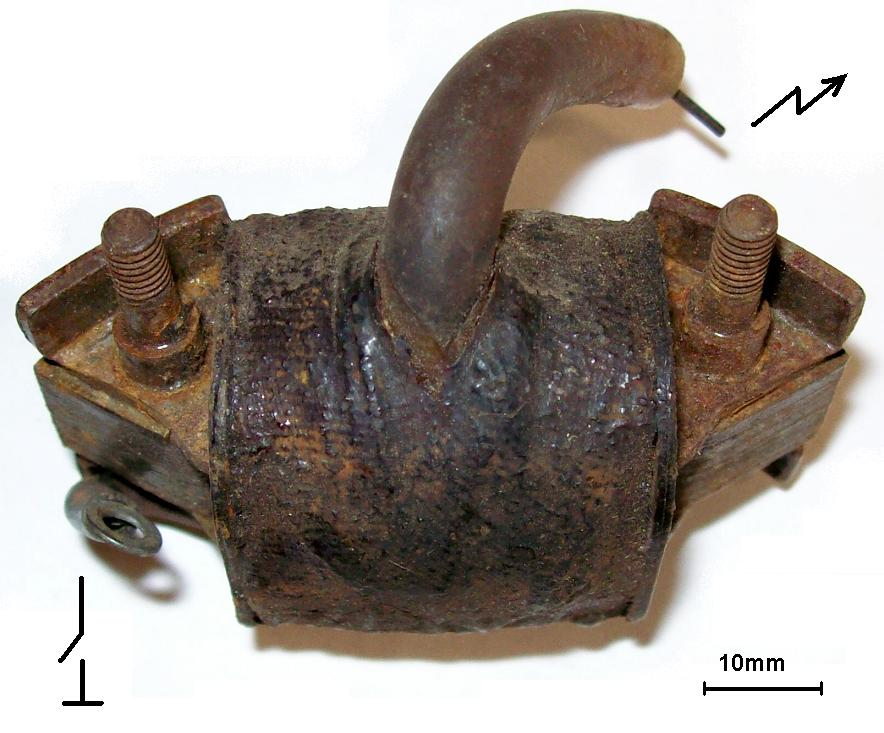
Ignition magneto

An ignition magneto (also called a high-tension magneto) is an older type of ignition system used in spark-ignition engines (such as petrol engines). It uses a magneto and a transformer to make pulses of high voltage for the spark plugs. The older term "high-tension" means "high-voltage".

Used on many cars in the early 20th century, ignition magnetos were largely replaced by induction coil ignition systems. The use of ignition magnetos is now confined mainly to engines without a battery, for example in lawnmowers and chainsaws. It is also used in modern piston-engined aircraft (even though a battery is present), to avoid the engine relying on an electrical system.

=== Induction coil systems ===
As batteries became more common in cars (due to the increased usage of electric starter motors), magneto systems were replaced by systems using an induction coil. The 1886 Benz Patent-Motorwagen and the 1908 Ford Model T used a trembler coil ignition system, whereby the trembler interrupted the current through the coil and caused a rapid series of sparks during each firing. The trembler coil would be energized at an appropriate point in the engine cycle. In the Model T, the four-cylinder engine had a trembler coil for each cylinder.

=== Distributor-based systems ===
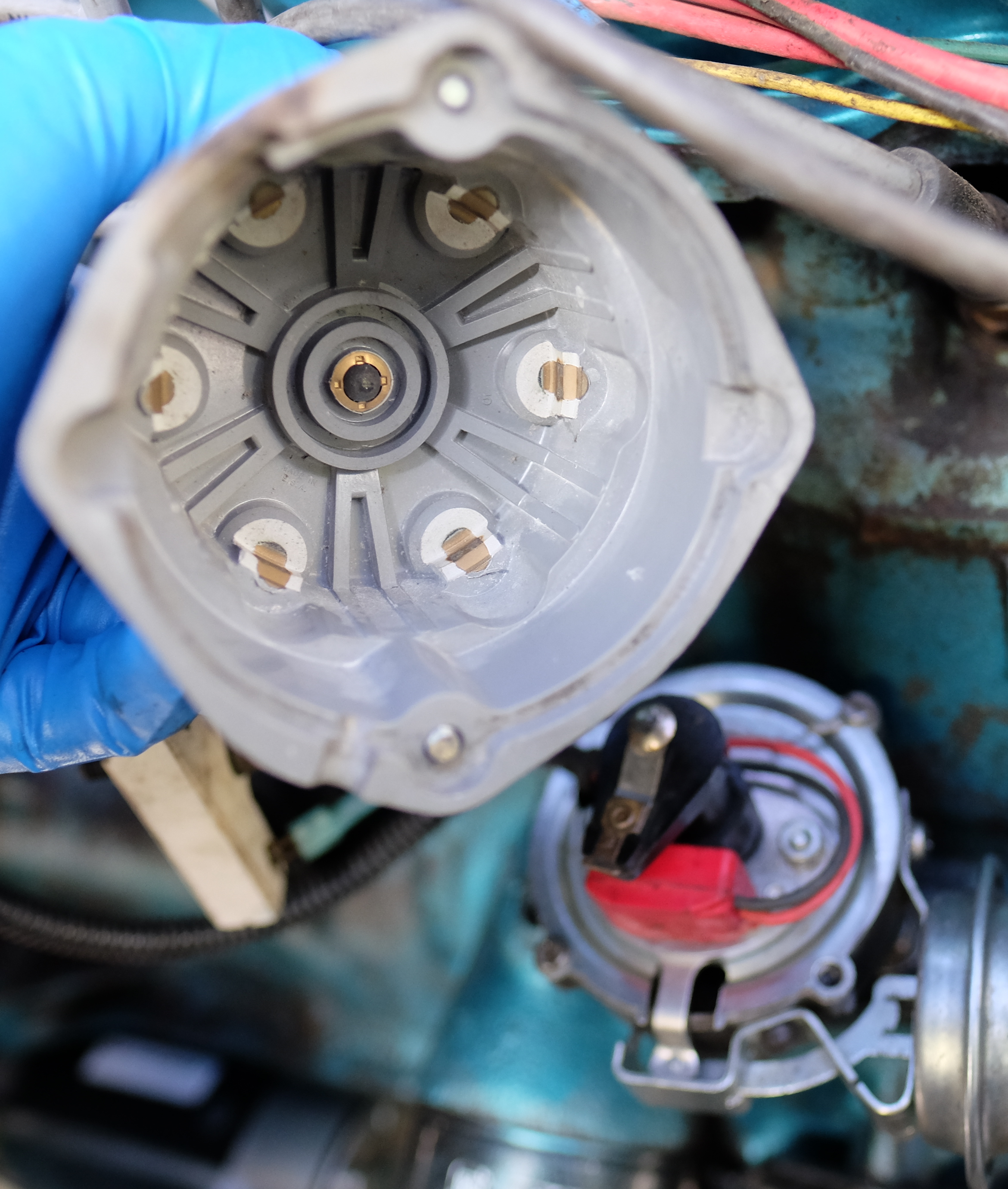
Rotor contacts inside distributor cap

An improved ignition system was invented by Charles Kettering at Delco in the United States and introduced in Cadillac's 1912 cars. The Kettering ignition system consisted of a single ignition coil, breaker points, a capacitor (to prevent the points from arcing at break) and a distributor (to direct the electricity from the ignition coil to the correct cylinder). The Kettering system became the primary ignition system for many years in the automotive industry due to its lower cost and relative simplicity.

== Electronic systems ==
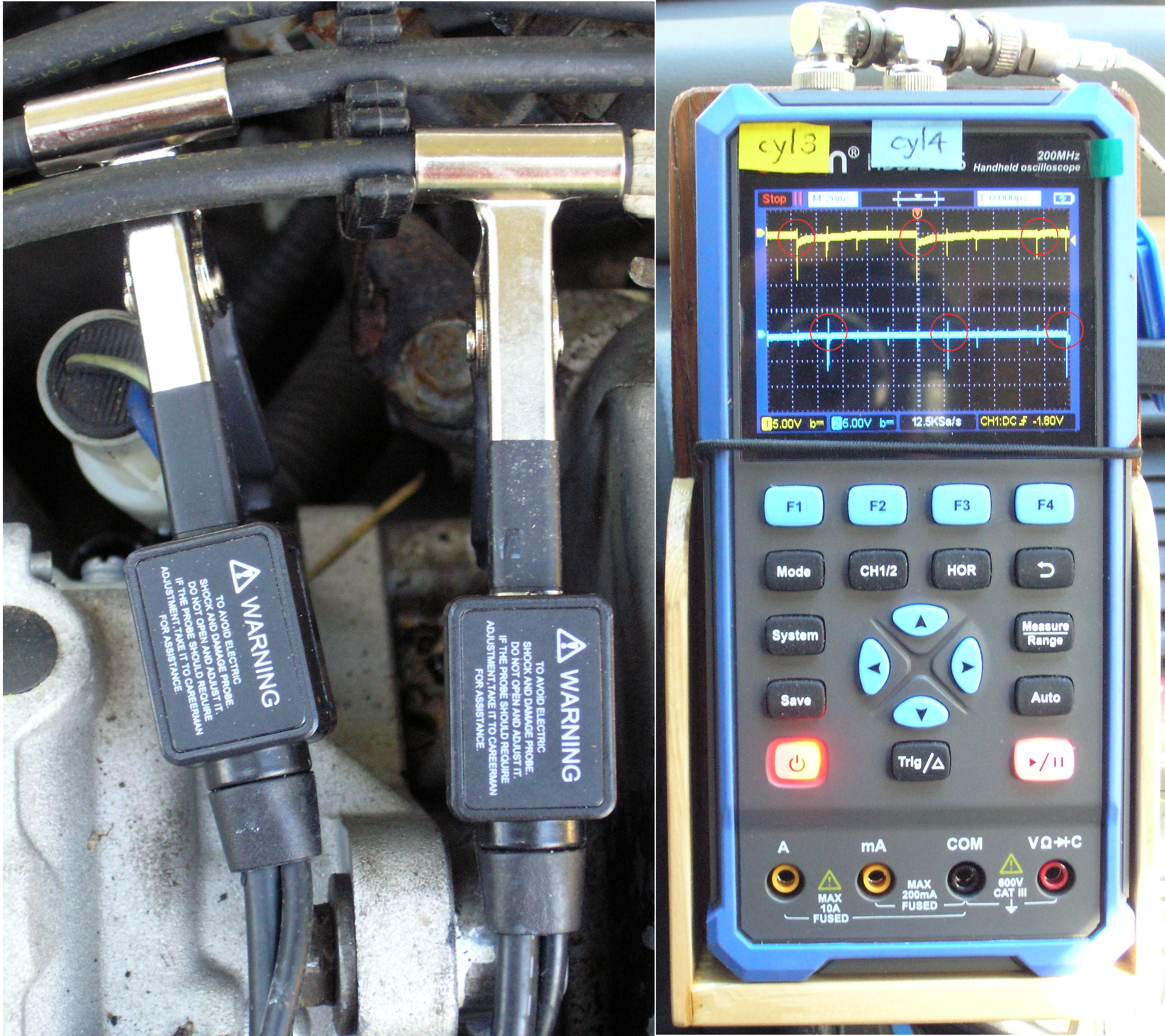
Honda Civic Si 1990. Spark plug wires of cylinders 3 and 4 each has a Hantek-HT25 connected. On the dash board, cables from the HT25s connect to an Owon HDS2202S. Ignitions, enclosed in red circles, have a sawtooth shape. Between successive ignitions, are three pulses from wasted sparks and crosstalk.

The first electronic ignition (a cold cathode type) was tested in 1948 by Delco-Remy, while Lucas introduced a transistorized ignition in 1955, which was used on BRM and Coventry Climax Formula One engines in 1962. The aftermarket began offering EI that year, with both the AutoLite Electric Transistor 201 and Tung-Sol EI-4 (thyratron capacitive discharge) being available. Pontiac became the first automaker to offer an optional EI, the breakerless magnetic pulse-triggered Delcotronic, on some 1963 models; it was also available on some Corvettes. The first commercially available all solid-state (SCR) capacitive discharge ignition was manufactured by Hyland Electronics in Canada also in 1963. Ford fitted a FORD designed breakerless system on the Lotus 25s entered at Indianapolis the next year, ran a fleet test in 1964, and began offering optional EI on some models in 1965. This electronic system was utilized on the GT40s campaigned by Shelby American and Holman and Moody. Robert C. Hogle, Ford Motor Company, presented the, "Mark II-GT Ignition and Electrical System", Publication #670068, at the SAE Congress, Detroit, Michigan, January 9–13, 1967. Beginning in 1958, Earl W. Meyer at Chrysler worked on EI, continuing until 1961 and resulting in use of EI on the company's NASCAR hemis in 1963 and 1964.

Prest-O-Lite's CD-65, which relied on capacitance discharge (CD), appeared in 1965, and had "an unprecedented 50,000 mile warranty." (This differs from the non-CD Prest-O-Lite system introduced on AMC products in 1972, and made standard equipment for the 1975 model year.) A similar CD unit was available from Delco in 1966, which was optional on Oldsmobile, Pontiac, and GMC vehicles in the 1967 model year. Also in 1967, Motorola debuted their breakerless CD system. The most famous aftermarket electronic ignition which debuted in 1965, was the Delta Mark 10 capacitive discharge ignition, which was sold assembled or as a kit.

The Fiat Dino was the first production car to come standard with EI in 1968, followed by the Jaguar XJ Series 1 in 1971, Chrysler (after a 1971 trial) in 1973 and by Ford and GM in 1975.

In 1967, Prest-O-Lite made a "Black Box" ignition amplifier, intended to take the load off the distributor's breaker points during high rpm runs, which was used by Dodge and Plymouth on their factory Super Stock Coronet and Belvedere drag racers. This amplifier was installed on the interior side of the cars' firewall, and had a duct which provided outside air to cool the unit. The rest of the system (distributor and spark plugs) remains as for the mechanical system. The lack of moving parts compared with the mechanical system leads to greater reliability and longer service intervals.

A variation coil-on-plug ignition has each coil handle two plugs, on cylinders which are 360 degrees out of phase (and therefore reach top dead center (TDC) at the same time); in the four-cycle engine this means that one plug will be sparking during the end of the exhaust stroke while the other fires at the usual time, a so-called "wasted spark" arrangement which has no drawbacks apart from faster spark plug erosion; the paired cylinders are 1/4 and 2/3 on four cylinder arrangements, 1/4, 6/3, 2/5 on six cylinder engines and 6/7, 4/1, 8/3 and 2/5 on V8 engines. Other systems do away with the distributor as a timing apparatus and use a magnetic crank angle sensor mounted on the crankshaft to trigger the ignition at the proper time.

=== Engine Control Units ===
Modern automotive engines use an engine control unit (ECU), which is a single device that controls various engine functions including the ignition system and the fuel injection. This contrasts earlier engines, where the fuel injection and ignition were operated as separate systems.

== Gas turbine and rocket engines ==
Gas turbine engines (including jet engines) use capacitor discharge ignition. Since combustion in gas turbines is self-sustaining once the combustor is lit, the ignition system is normally only used at startup. However, aircraft jet engines generally have the option to leave the ignition system active continuously under certain circumstances, such as when severe turbulence or heavy precipitation are encountered during flight. This ensures that, should a flameout occur, the engine will relight without requiring manual intervention from the pilot(s).

The ignition system in a rocket engine is critical to avoiding a hard start or explosion. Rockets often employ pyrotechnic devices that place flames across the face of the injector plate, or, alternatively, hypergolic propellants that ignite spontaneously on contact with each other.

== See also ==
- Electromagnetism
- Faraday's law of induction
- History of the internal combustion engine
