= Firing order =

Sequence of cylinder ignition in a piston engine

For this inline-4 engine, 1-3-4-2 could be a valid firing order.

The firing order of an internal combustion engine is the sequence of ignition for the cylinders.

In a spark ignition (e.g. gasoline/petrol) engine, the firing order corresponds to the order in which the spark plugs are operated. In a diesel engine, the firing order corresponds to the order in which fuel is injected into each cylinder. Four-stroke engines must also time the valve openings relative to the firing order, as the valves do not open and close on every stroke.

Firing order affects the vibration, sound and evenness of power output from the engine and heavily influences crankshaft design.

== Cylinder numbering ==
The firing order is represented in the format 1-2-3-4, where each number corresponds to the cylinder number.

=== Numbering systems for car engines ===
The numbering system for cylinders is generally based on the cylinder numbers increasing from the front to the rear of an engine (See engine orientation below). However, there are differences between manufacturers in how this is applied; some commonly used systems are as listed below.

==== Straight engine ====
In a straight engine the cylinders are numbered from front (#1 cylinder) to rear.

==== V engine ====
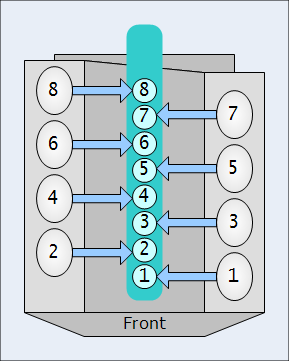
V8 engine with cylinder numbering based on crankshaft position (instead of following each cylinder bank)

In a V engine the frontmost cylinder is usually #1, however there are two common approaches:

- Numbering the cylinders in each bank sequentially (e.g. 1-2-3-4 along the left bank and 5-6-7-8 along the right bank). This approach is typically used by V8 engines from Audi, Ford and Porsche.
- Numbering the cylinders based on their position along the crankshaft (e.g. 1-3-5-7 along the right bank and 2-4-6-8 along the left bank). This approach is typically used by V8 engines from General Motors, and Chrysler.

The selection of whether the #1 cylinder is on the left bank or right bank usually depends on which bank is closer to the front of the crankshaft. However, the Ford Flathead V8 and Pontiac V8 engine actually have the #1 cylinder behind the cylinder from the opposite bank. This was done so that all Ford engines would have cylinder #1 on the right bank and all Pontiac engines would have cylinder #1 on the left bank, to simplify the process of identifying the cylinders.

==== Radial engine ====
In a radial engine the cylinders are numbered around the circle, in clockwise direction with the #1 cylinder at the top.

=== Engine orientation within cars ===
The simplest situation is a longitudinal engine located at the front of the car, which means the engine's orientation is the same as the car's. This illustrates that the rear of the engine is the end that connects to the transmission, while the front end often has the drive belt for accessories (such as the alternator and water pump). The left bank of the engine is on the left side of the car (when looking from behind the car), and vice versa for the right bank of the engine.

For a transverse engine located at the front of the car, whether the front of the engine is at the left-hand or right-hand side of the car is best determined based on the side of the car where the transmission is located (which corresponds to the rear of the engine). Most transverse engine front-wheel drive models have the front of the engine at the right-hand side of the car (except for many Honda cars). As a consequence, the left bank of a transversely V engine is usually closest to the front of the car.

For cars where the engine is installed 'backwards' (i.e. the transmission is closer to the front of the car than the engine, or under the engine), cylinder #1 is located towards the firewall, the rear of the car. This is the case for the Citroën Traction Avant, Saab 99, Saab 900 and many rear-engine cars.

=== Numbering systems for ship engines ===
Contrary to most car engines, a ship's engines are often numbered starting from the end of the engine with the power output. Large diesel truck and locomotive engines, particularly of European manufacture, may also be numbered this way.

Cylinders on V engines often include a letter representing the cylinder bank. For example, a V6 engine could have cylinders A1-A2-A3-B1-B2-B3, with cylinders A1 and B1 located at the power output end of the engine.

== Common firing orders ==
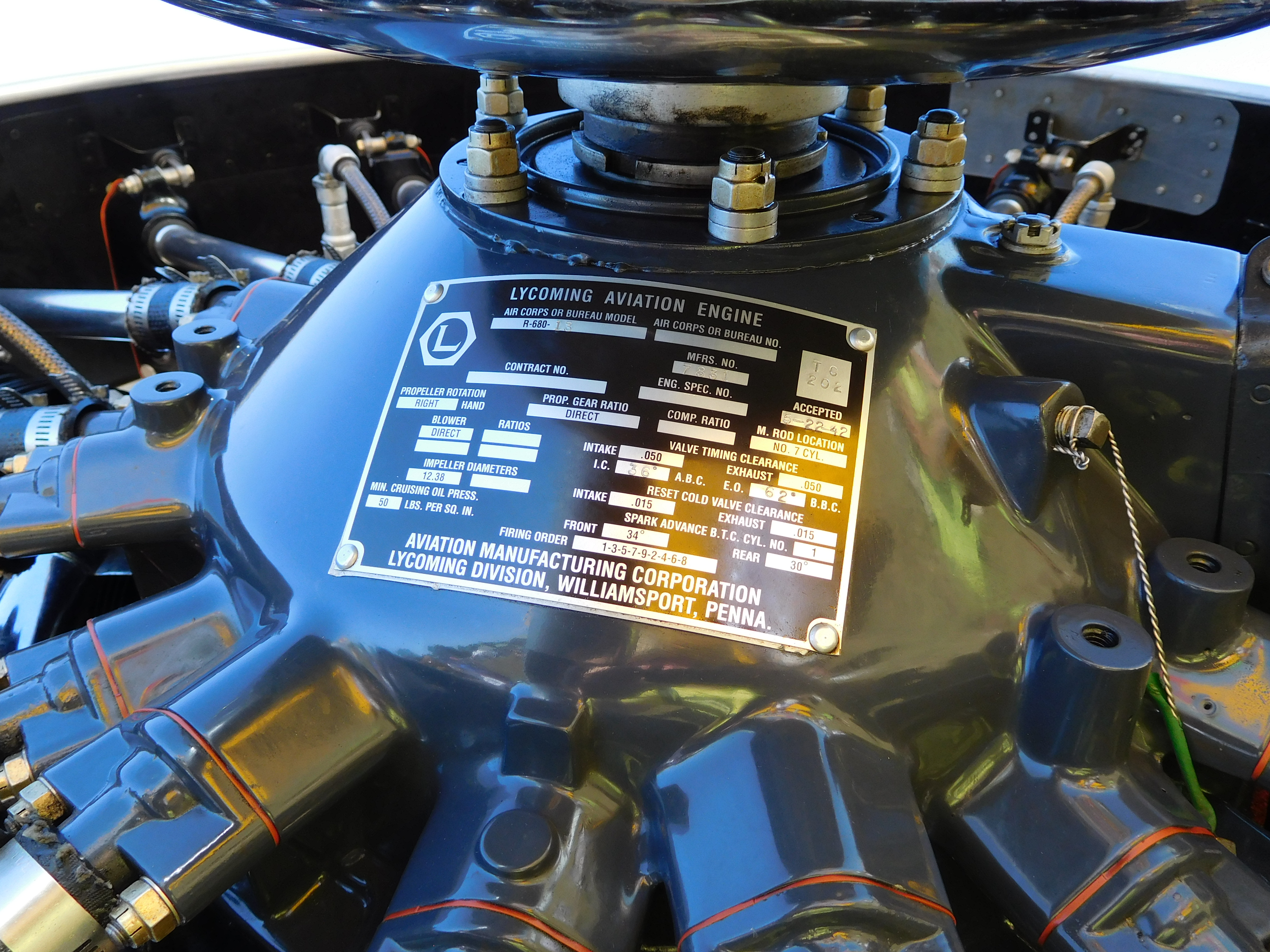
Firing order shown on a Lycoming R-680-13 9-cylinder radial engine

Common firing orders are listed below. For V engines and flat engines, the numbering system is L1 for the front cylinder of the left bank, R1 for the front cylinder of the right bank, etc.

- In two-cylinder engines, the cylinders fire one after the other (such as in a straight-twin engine, where either an even-fire or an odd-fire configuration is possible for a four-stroke engine).
- In straight-three engines, there is no effective difference between the possible firing orders of 1-2-3 and 1-3-2.
- Straight-four engines typically use a firing order of 1-3-4-2, however some British engines used a firing order of 1-2-4-3.
- Flat-four engines typically use a firing order of R1-R2-L1-L2.
- Straight-five engines typically use a firing order of 1-2-4-5-3, in order to minimise the primary vibration from the rocking couple.
- Straight-six engines typically use a firing order of 1-5-3-6-2-4. However, a firing order of 1-2-4-6-5-3 is common on medium-speed marine engines.
- V6 engines with an angle of 90 degrees between the cylinder banks have used a firing orders of R1-L2-R2-L3-L1-R3 or R1-L3-R3-L2-R2-L1. Several V6 engines with an angle of 60 degrees have used a firing order of R1-L1-R2-L2-R3-L3.
- Flat-six engines have used firing orders of R1-L2-R3-L1-R2-L3 or R1-L3-R2-L1-R3-L2.
- V8 engines use various different firing orders, even using different firing orders between engines from the same manufacturer.
- V10 engines used firing orders of either R1-L5-R5-L2-R2-L3-R3-L4-R4-L1 or R1-L1-R5-L5-R2-L2-R3-L3-R4-L4.
- V12 engines use various different firing orders.

In a radial engine, there are always an odd number of cylinders in each bank, as this allows for a constant alternate cylinder firing order: for example, with a single bank of 7 cylinders, the order would be 1-3-5-7-2-4-6. Moreover, unless there is an odd number of cylinders, the ring cam around the nose of the engine would be unable to provide the inlet valve open - exhaust valve open sequence required by the four-stroke cycle.

== Firing interval ==
To minimise vibrations, most engines use an evenly spaced firing interval. This means that the timing of the power stroke is evenly spaced between cylinders. For a four-stroke engine, this requires a firing interval of 720° divided by the number of cylinders, for example a six-cylinder engine would have a firing interval of 120°. On the other hand, a six-cylinder engine with an uneven firing interval could have intervals of 90° and 150°.

Engines with an even firing interval will sound smoother, have less vibration and provide more even pressure pulses in the exhaust gas to the turbocharger. Engines with an uneven firing interval usually have a burble or a throaty, growling engine sound and more vibrations.

The main application of uneven firing intervals is motorcycle engines, such as big-bang firing order engines. Examples of odd-firing engines are most four-stroke V-twin engines, 1961-1977 Buick V6 engine, 1985-present Yamaha VMAX, 1986–present Honda VFR 750/800, 1992-2017 Dodge Viper V10, 2008-present Audi/Lamborghini 5.2 V10 40v FSI and the 2009-2020 Yamaha R1 (inline four engine with a crossplane crankshaft).

== See also ==
- Engine configuration
- Four-stroke engine
- Two-stroke engine
- Wasted spark system
