= Aliasing (disambiguation) =

Aliasing is a feature in signal processing and related disciplines.

Aliasing may also refer to:

- Alias (command), a replacement command in various command line interpreters
- Aliasing (computing), having multiple labels or names for the same memory location
- Aliasing (factorial experiments), a property that makes some effects in factorial experiments "aliased", or indistinguishable from each other.

== See also ==
- Anti-aliasing
- Anti-aliasing filter
