= Flicker (light) =

Fluctuations in the luminance of a light

In visual perception, flicker is a human-visible change in luminance of an illuminated surface or light source which can be due to fluctuations of the light source itself, or due to external causes such as due to rapid fluctuations in the voltage of the power supply (power-line flicker) or incompatibility with an external dimmer.

Twinkling, also called scintillation, is a generic term for variations in apparent brightness, colour, or position of a distant luminous object viewed through a medium.

Flicker exists for other organisms having different perceptual thresholds.

Light meters and image sensors can potentially detect flicker at much higher frequency bands than human vision. Shutter speeds used in motion photography can interact with high frequency flicker to produce visual artifacts in the captured imagery that betray flicker that would not otherwise be noted.

The spectral sensitivity of the human eye to flicker depends upon the mode of visual perception. Due to the flicker fusion threshold of foveal vision, steady vision can rarely detect flicker above 90 Hz, whereas flicker can be perceived during visual saccades up to or beyond 1 kHz.

Flicker due to mechanical factors such as AC line frequency (typically 50 or 60 Hz) will have a stable frequency structure, whereas the flicker of a damp or failing light bulb will often have a chaotic or erratic frequency structure.

== Temporal light modulation ==
Temporal light modulation (TLM) is a slightly broader concept defined by the International Commission on Illumination (CIE) as fluctuation in luminous quantity or spectral distribution of light with respect to time. The effect is typically connected to lighting products such as lamps and luminaires where the light is modulated in order to provide some functionality, such as dimming or color change. TLM can cause temporal light artifacts (TLA) such as the stroboscopic effect or phantom array effect. TLM has been linked to headache and migraine, and in rare cases epileptic seizures.

== Effects ==
Various scientific committees have assessed the potential health, performance and safety-related aspects resulting from TLMs, including light flicker. Adverse effects of flicker include annoyance, reduced task performance, visual fatigue, headache and epileptic attack by photosensitive persons. The visibility aspects of flicker are given in a technical note of CIE; see CIE TN 006:2016. In general, undesired effects in the visual perception of a human observer induced by light intensity fluctuations are called temporal light artefacts (TLAs).

== Root causes ==
Light emitted from lighting equipment such as luminaires and lamps may vary in strength as function of time, either intentionally or unintentionally. Intentional light variations are applied for warning, signalling (e.g. traffic-light signalling, flashing aviation light signals), entertainment (like stage lighting) with the purpose that flicker is perceived by people. Generally, the light output of lighting equipment may also have unintentional light level modulations due to the lighting equipment itself. The magnitude, shape, periodicity and frequency of the TLMs will depend on many factors such as the type of light source, the electrical mains-supply frequency, the driver or ballast technology and type of light regulation technology applied (e.g. pulse-width modulation). If the modulation frequency is below the flicker fusion threshold and if the magnitude of the TLM exceeds a certain level, then such TLMs are perceived as flicker. These TLM-properties may vary over time due to aging effects. Component failure within lighting equipment or end-of-life behavior of lighting equipment can also give rise to flicker. Furthermore, external factors such as incompatibility with dimmers or presence of mains-supply voltage fluctuations (power-line flicker) are root causes of flicker.

Flicker can also be perceived from naturally modulated light sources like candle light or a sunlit water surface or it may be experienced while driving along a row of trees lit by the sun. TLMs and resulting flicker can be seen also while driving with a certain speed along a street or through a tunnel lit by lighting equipment positioned with a regular spacing.

== Visibility ==
Temporal light modulations become visible if the modulation frequency is below the flicker fusion threshold and if the magnitude of the TLM exceeds a certain levels.

There are much more factors that determine the visibility of TLMs as flicker:

- The shape properties of the light waveform (e.g. sinusoidal, rectangular pulse and its duty cycle); see Figure 1;
- The average light level of the light source and its contrast with the background light level within the environment;
- The viewing angle and changes in direction of view by the observer;
- Physiological factors such as age and fatigue.

All observer-related influence quantities are stochastic parameters, because not all humans perceive the same light ripple in the same way. That is why perception of flicker is always expressed with a certain probability. Detailed explanations on the visibility of flicker and other temporal light artefacts are given in CIE TN 006:2016 and in a recorded webinar "Is it all just flicker?".

== Objective assessment of flicker ==
=== Light flickermeter ===
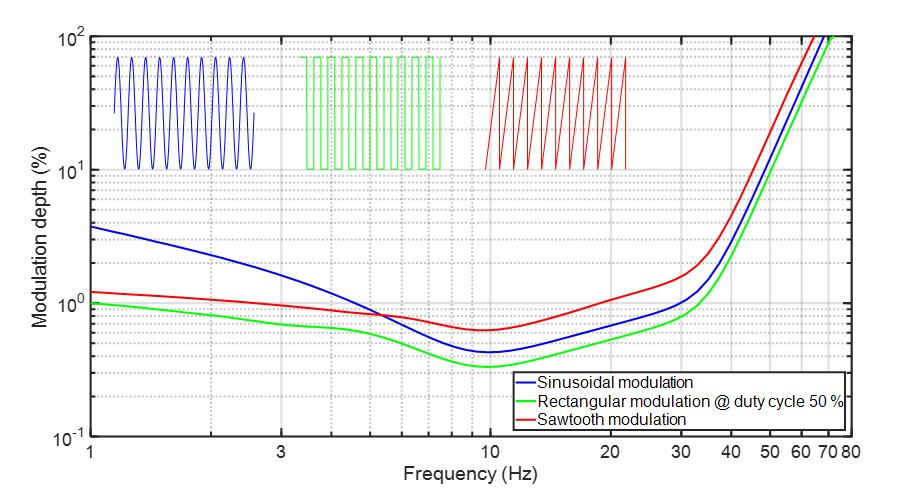
Figure 1: Flicker visibility threshold curves for three different types of light modulations; values of modulation depth as a function of modulation frequency at which flicker is perceivable on average (P_{st}^{LM}=1 curves)

For objective assessment of flicker, a widely applied and IEC-standardized metric, the short-term flicker indicator (P_{st}^{LM}) is used. This metric is derived from the short term flicker severity metric P_{st}^{V} that is applied in the power quality domain for testing electrical apparatus for their potential to cause flicker via voltage fluctuations on the electrical mains network (see the IEC publications IEC 61000-3-3 and IEC 61000-4-15). The short-term flicker indicator P_{st}^{LM} is implemented in a light flickermeter which processes the light measured by means of a light sensor. The light flickermeter consists of four processing blocks which include weighting filters to account for frequency dependency of the visibility of TLMs as well as statistical processing to enable assessing a-periodic TLMs. The specification of the light flickermeter and the test method for objective flicker assessment of lighting equipment is published in IEC technical report IEC TR 61547–1.

It is recommended to calculate the value of P_{st}^{LM} using a light waveform recorded for at least three minutes. This enables proper assessment of flicker occurring at low repetition frequencies.

NOTE - Several alternative metrics such as Modulation Depth, Flicker Percentage or Flicker Index are being applied. None of these metrics are suitable to predict actual human perception because human perception is impacted by modulation depth, modulation frequency, wave shape and if applicable the duty cycle of the TLM.

=== Matlab toolbox ===
A Matlab light flicker assessment toolbox including a function for calculating P_{st}^{LM} and some application examples are available on the Matlab Central via the Mathworks Community.

=== Acceptance criterion ===
The perceptibility scale of P_{st}^{LM} (and P_{st}^{V}) is chosen such that a value of 1.0 corresponds to a level at which 50% of human test subjects judge the flicker to be both noticeable and irritating (Figure 1).

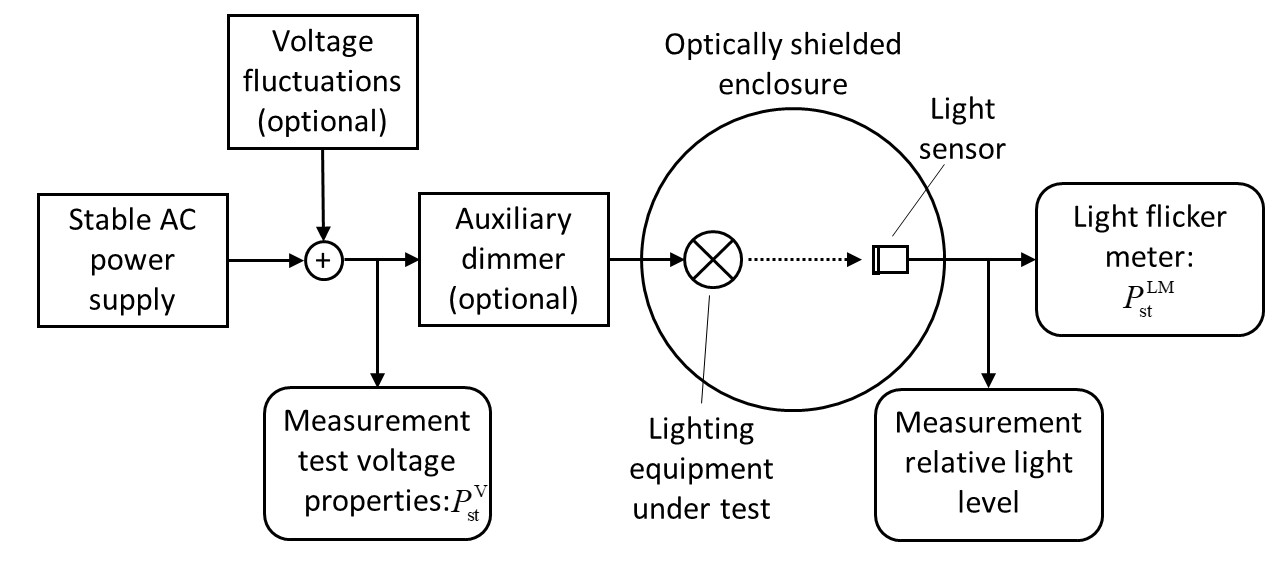
Figure 2: Generic setup to test lighting equipment for its flicker performance.

=== Test and measurement applications ===
The objective light flickermeter can be applied for different purposes (see Figure 2 and IEC TR 61547-1):

- Measurement the intrinsic flicker performance of lighting equipment when supplied with a stable mains voltage;
- Testing the immunity of lighting equipment against voltage fluctuation disturbances on the AC mains;
- Testing the effect of light regulation of lighting equipment or the effect of an external dimmer (dimmer compatibility).

== Publications of standards development organisations ==
1. IEC TR 61457-1:2017: light flickermeter specification and verification method, and test procedure for voltage fluctuation immunity and dimmer compatibility.
2. NEMA 77-2017: among others, flicker test Methods and guidance for acceptance criteria.

=== Ceiling fans and wind turbines ===
Other examples of light flicker can sometimes be associated with ceiling fans or wind turbines This occurs when the rotation of the blade continuously blocks the light source (i.e. indoor ceiling light or Sun), causing visual flicker.

== See also ==
- Persistence of vision
- Temporal light artefacts
- Temporal light effects
- Power-line flicker
- Power quality
- Flicker fusion threshold
- Flicker problems in fluorescent lamps
- Stroboscopic effect (lighting)
