= TLE =

TLE may stand for:

== Arts and entertainment ==
- The Living End, an Australian band formed in 1994
- Star Trek: The Lost Era, a novel series in the Star Trek franchise
- Lost Experience, a game based on the Lost television series

== Medicine ==
- Temporal lobe epilepsy, the most common form of focal seizure, originating in the temporal lobe of the brain

== Science and technology ==
- Kimber Custom TLE II, a model of the Kimber Custom handgun
- Temporal light effects, wanted or unwanted effects caused by light modulations
- Total lunar eclipse, an astronomical event
- Transient luminous event, or upper-atmospheric lightning, a weather phenomenon
- Two-line element set, a format for distributing orbital element data

== Other uses ==
- Technology and Livelihood Education, part of an educational curriculum in the Philippines
- The London Economic, a left-wing digital newspaper based in the UK
