= TLI =

TLI may refer to:

- Thallium(I) iodide, a Thallium compound
- Transport Layer Interface, a networking application programming interface.
- Trans-lunar injection, a propulsive maneuver used to set a spacecraft on a trajectory which will arrive at the Moon.
- Tseng Laboratories, Inc., the full corporate name of Tseng Labs
- Tall Latte index, an economic index based on the cost of a cup of Starbucks coffee
- Taipei Language Institute, an institute for teaching Mandarin Chinese founded in 1956
- The Lonely Island, an American comedy troupe
- The Living Infinite
- Trophic level index, an index used in New Zealand for measuring the nutrient content of a lake
- Term Life Insurance
- Temporal light interference, undesired degradation or malfunction of an equipment or system caused by light modulations
