= Stroboscopic =

Stroboscopic may refer to:

- Stroboscopic effect, visual temporal aliasing
- Stroboscopic effect (lighting), a temporal light artefact visible if a moving object is lit with modulated light with specific modulation frequencies and amplitudes
- Stroboscope, any of various stroboscopic devices
- Strobe light, high-intensity and short-duration stroboscopic device
