= Wagon-wheel effect =

Optical illusion

Video of the propeller of a Bombardier Q400 taken with a digital camera showing the wagon-wheel effect

Video of a spinning, patterned paper disc. At a certain speed the sets of spokes appear to slow and rotate in opposite directions.

The wagon-wheel effect (alternatively called stagecoach-wheel effect) is an optical illusion in which a spoked wheel appears to rotate differently from its true rotation. The wheel can appear to rotate more slowly than the true rotation, it can appear stationary, or it can appear to rotate in the opposite direction from the true rotation (reverse rotation effect).

The wagon-wheel effect is most often seen in film or television depictions of stagecoaches or wagons in Western movies, although recordings of any regularly spoked rotating object will show it, such as helicopter rotors, aircraft propellers and car rims. In these recorded media, the effect is a result of temporal aliasing. It can also commonly be seen when a rotating wheel is illuminated by flickering light. These forms of the effect are known as stroboscopic effects: the original smooth rotation of the wheel is visible only intermittently. A version of the wagon-wheel effect can also be seen under continuous illumination.

== Under stroboscopic conditions ==
As the "camera" accelerates right, the objects first speed up sliding to the left. At the halfway point, they suddenly appear to change direction but continue accelerating left, slowing down.

Bus accelerating to cross a bridge with a fence

Stroboscopic conditions ensure that the visibility of a rotating wheel is broken into a series of very brief episodes, interrupted by episodes of invisibility. While cameras usually offer little or no options to adjust the frequency of recording to the frequency of a fast cyclic motion, a stroboscope can typically have its frequency set to any value. Artificial lighting that is temporally modulated when powered by alternating current, such as gas discharge lamps (including neon, mercury vapor, sodium vapor and fluorescent tubes), flicker at twice the frequency of the power line (for example 100 times per second on a 50-cycle line). In each cycle of current the power peaks twice (once with positive voltage and once with negative voltage) and twice goes to zero, and the light output varies accordingly. In all of these cases, a person sees a rotating wheel under stroboscopic conditions.

Imagine that the true rotation of a four-spoke wheel is clockwise. The first instance of visibility of the wheel may occur when one spoke is at 12 o'clock. If by the time the next instance of visibility occurs, the spoke previously at 9 o'clock has moved into the 12-o'clock position, then a viewer will perceive the wheel to be stationary. If at the second instance of visibility, the next spoke has moved to the 11:30 position, then a viewer will perceive the wheel to be rotating backwards. If at the second instance of visibility, the next spoke has moved to the 12:30 position, then a viewer will perceive the wheel to be rotating forwards, albeit more slowly than the wheel is actually rotating. The effect relies on a motion perception property called beta movement: motion is seen between two objects in different positions in the visual field at different times providing the objects are similar (which is true of spoked wheels—each spoke is essentially identical to the others) and providing the objects are close (which is true of the originally 9-o'clock spoke in the second instant—it is closer to 12 o'clock than the originally 12-o'clock spoke).

Finlay, Dodwell, and Caelli (1984) and Finlay and Dodwell (1987) studied perception of rotating wheels under stroboscopic illumination when the duration of each frame was long enough for observers to see the real rotation. Despite this, the rotation direction was dominated by the wagon-wheel effect. Finlay and Dodwell (1987) argued that there are some critical differences between the wagon-wheel effect and beta movement, but their argument has not troubled the consensus.

The wagon-wheel effect is exploited in some engineering tasks, such as adjusting the timing of an engine. This is also done in some turntables for vinyl records. Since the pitch of music reproduction depends on rotation speed, these models have regular markings on the side of the rotating platter. The periodicity of these markings is calibrated in such a way that, under local mains frequency (50 Hz or 60 Hz), when the rotation has exactly the desired speed of 33 + 1/3 rpm, they appear to be static.

== Under continuous illumination ==
=== Effective stroboscopic presentation by vibrating the eyes ===
Rushton (1967) observed the wagon-wheel effect under continuous illumination while humming. The humming vibrates the eyes in their sockets, effectively creating stroboscopic conditions within the eye. By humming at a frequency of a multiple of the rotation frequency, he was able to stop the rotation. By humming at slightly higher and lower frequencies, he was able to make the rotation reverse slowly and to make the rotation go slowly in the direction of rotation. A similar stroboscopic effect is now commonly observed by people eating crunchy foods, such as carrots, while watching TV: the image appears to shimmer. The crunching vibrates the eyes at a multiple of the frame rate of the TV. Besides vibrations of the eyes, the effect can be produced by observing wheels via a vibrating mirror. Rear-view mirrors in vibrating cars can produce the effect.

=== Truly continuous illumination ===
The first to observe the wagon-wheel effect under truly continuous illumination (such as from the sun) was Schouten (1967). He distinguished three forms of subjective stroboscopy which he called alpha, beta, and gamma: Alpha stroboscopy occurs at 8–12 cycles per second; the wheel appears to become stationary, although "some sectors [spokes] look as though they are performing a hurdle race over the standing ones" (p. 48). Beta stroboscopy occurs at 30–35 cycles per second: "The distinctness of the pattern has all but disappeared. At times a definite counterrotation is seen of a grayish striped pattern" (pp. 48–49). Gamma stroboscopy occurs at 40–100 cycles per second: "The disk appears almost uniform except that at all sector frequencies a standing grayish pattern is seen ... in a quivery sort of standstill" (pp. 49–50). Schouten interpreted beta stroboscopy, reversed rotation, as consistent with there being Reichardt detectors in the human visual system for encoding motion. Because the spoked wheel patterns he used (radial gratings) are regular, they can strongly stimulate detectors for the true rotation, but also weakly stimulate detectors for the reverse rotation.

There are two broad theories for the wagon-wheel effect under truly continuous illumination. The first is that human visual perception takes a series of still frames of the visual scene and that movement is perceived much like a movie. The second is Schouten's theory: that moving images are processed by visual detectors sensitive to the true motion and also by detectors sensitive to opposite motion from temporal aliasing. There is evidence for both theories, but the weight of evidence favours the latter.

==== Discrete frames theory ====
Purves, Paydarfar, and Andrews (1996) proposed the discrete-frames theory. One piece of evidence for this theory comes from Dubois and VanRullen (2011). They reviewed experiences of users of LSD who often report that under the influence of the drug a moving object is seen trailing a series of still images behind it. They asked such users to match their drug experiences with movies simulating such trailing images viewed when not under the drug. They found that users selected movies around 15–20 Hz. This is between Schouten's alpha and beta rates.

==== Temporal aliasing theory ====
Kline, Holcombe, and Eagleman (2004) confirmed the observation of reversed rotation with regularly spaced dots on a rotating drum. They called this "illusory motion reversal". They showed that these occurred only after a long time of viewing the rotating display (from about 30 seconds to as long as 10 minutes for some observers). They also showed that the instances of reversed rotation were independent in different parts of the visual field. This is inconsistent with discrete frames covering the entire visual scene. Kline, Holcombe, and Eagleman (2006) also showed that reversed rotation of a radial grating in one part of the visual field was independent of superimposed orthogonal motion in the same part of the visual field. The orthogonal motion was of a circular grating contracting so as to have the same temporal frequency as the radial grating. This is inconsistent with discrete frames covering local parts of visual scene. Kline et al. concluded that the reverse rotations were consistent with Reichardt detectors for the reverse direction of rotation becoming sufficiently active to dominate perception of the true rotation in a form of rivalry. The long time required to see the reverse rotation suggests that neural adaptation of the detectors responding to the true rotation has to occur before the weakly stimulated reverse-rotation detectors can contribute to perception.

Some small doubts about the results of Kline et al. (2004) sustain adherents of the discrete-frame theory. These doubts include Kline et al.'s finding in some observers more instances of simultaneous reversals from different parts of the visual field than would be expected by chance, and finding in some observers differences in the distribution of the durations of reversals from that expected by a pure rivalry process (Rojas, Carmona-Fontaine, López-Calderón, & Aboitiz, 2006).

In 2008, Kline and Eagleman demonstrated that illusory reversals of two spatially overlapping motions could be perceived separately, providing further evidence that illusory motion reversal is not caused by temporal sampling. They also showed that illusory motion reversal occurs with non-uniform and non-periodic stimuli (for example, a spinning belt of sandpaper), which also cannot be compatible with discrete sampling. Kline and Eagleman proposed instead that the effect results from a "motion during-effect", meaning that a motion after-effect becomes superimposed on the real motion.

== Dangers ==
The effect can make some rotating machines, such as lathes, dangerous to operate under artificial lighting because at certain speeds the machines will falsely appear to be stopped or to be moving slowly. Because of this, it is advised that single-phase lighting be avoided in workshops and factories. For example, a factory that is lit from a single-phase supply with basic fluorescent lighting will have a flicker of twice the mains frequency, either at 100 or 120 Hz (depending on country); thus, any machinery rotating at multiples of this frequency may appear to not be turning.

Seeing that the most common types of AC motors are locked to the mains frequency, this can pose a considerable hazard to operators of lathes and other rotating equipment.

Solutions include deploying the lighting over a full 3-phase supply, or by using high-frequency controllers that drive the lights at safer frequencies. Traditional incandescent light bulbs, which employ filaments that glow continuously with only a minor modulation, offer another option as well, albeit at the expense of increased power consumption. Smaller incandescent lights can be used as task lighting on equipment to help combat this effect to avoid the cost of operating larger quantities of incandescent lighting in a workshop environment.

== See also ==
- Aliasing
- Stroboscopic effect
- Rolling shutter
