= Temporal light effects =

Temporal light effect (TLE) is the general term for all side-effects resulting from temporal light modulation (TLM).

== Root cause ==
Light emitted from lighting equipment such as luminaires and lamps may vary in strength as function of time, either intentionally or unintentionally. Intentional light variations are applied amongst others for warning, signalling (e.g. traffic-light signalling, flashing aviation light signals), entertainment (like stage lighting), metrology (strobe light for measurement of rotation speed), navigation (like optical beacons, lighthouses) or for communication (Li-Fi).

Generally, the light output of lighting equipment may also have unintentional light level modulations due to the lighting equipment itself. The magnitude, shape, periodicity and frequency of the TLM will depend on many factors such as the type of light source, the electrical mains-supply frequency, the driver or ballast technology and type of light regulation technology applied (e.g. pulse-width modulation). These TLM properties may vary over time due to aging effects, component failure or end-of-life behavior. Furthermore, external factors such as incompatibility with dimmers or presence of mains-supply voltage fluctuations (power-line flicker) play a role.

TLMs are also known from non-electrical lighting sources like candle light or they may be experienced while driving along a row of trees lit by the sun or by driving through a tunnel lit by luminaires having a certain spacing.

== Categories of temporal light effects ==
Obviously, the intentional TLMs listed under 'Root cause' above result into wanted effects. In many cases TLMs may cause unacceptable annoying effects such as flicker or stroboscopic effect that can directly be perceived by humans. These effects are categorized as temporal light artefacts (TLAs). In additional to mood changes and disturbances, TLM flicker may induce epileptic reactions in susceptible people (photosensitive epilepsy).

Temporal light modulations may also induce disturbance or malfunction of equipment that applies light as input signal. Examples are barcode scanners, cameras and medical test equipment. Interference of photo, film and video cameras may become visible by humans after displaying the image or replaying the recorded video or projection of a film. Typical unwanted artefacts that can be seen on a display or projection screen are flickering of the image and banding (still or rolling) through the image. Unwanted temporal light effects of equipment are categorized as temporal light interference (TLI).

== See also ==
- Temporal light artefacts
- Temporal light interference
- Stroboscopic effect
- Power-line flicker

== Other references ==
- CIE technical committee TC 1-83 on VISUAL ASPECTS OF TIME-MODULATED LIGHTING SYSTEMS.
- CIE technical committee TC 2-89 on MEASUREMENT OF TEMPORAL LIGHT MODULATION OF LIGHT SOURCES AND LIGHTING SYSTEMS
