= Temporal light artefacts =

Temporal light artefacts (TLAs) are undesired effects in the visual perception of a human observer induced by temporal light modulations. Two well-known examples of such unwanted effects are flicker and stroboscopic effect. Flicker is a directly visible light modulation at relatively low frequencies (< 80 Hz) and small intensity modulation levels. Stroboscopic effect may become visible for a person when a moving object is illuminated by modulated light at somewhat higher frequencies (>80 Hz) and larger intensity variations.

== Relevance ==
Various scientific committees have assessed the potential health, performance and safety-related aspects resulting from temporal light modulations. TLAs must be limited to certain levels to avoid annoyance due to the direct visibility by humans and to prevent potential health issues. After longer exposure, TLAs may reduce task performance and cause fatigue. Possible health effects for specific persons are photosensitive epileptic seizure, migraine and aggravation of autistic behaviour. The incorrect perception of the motion of an object due to stroboscopic effect may be unacceptable in working environments with fast moving or rotating machinery.

== Types ==
TLAs are generally unwanted effects that may be perceived by humans due to the fact that the light output of a lighting equipment varies with time. Different TLA phenomena, the associated terms and definitions and their visibility aspects are given in a technical note of CIE; see CIE TN 006:2016. In CIE TN 006:2016 three types of TLAs are distinguished:

- Flicker refers to unacceptable (irritating) light variation of a light source that is perceived by an average person, either directly or via a reflecting surface;
- Stroboscopic effect is an unwanted effect which may become visible for an average person when a moving or rotating object is illuminated by a time-modulated light source;
- Phantom array (or ghosting) may be perceived by an average person when making an eye saccade over a small light source having a periodic fluctuation, the light source is then perceived as a series of spatially extended light spots.

Further background and explanations on the different TLA phenomena are given in a recorded webinar "Is it all just flicker?". Models for the visibility of flicker and stroboscopic effect from the temporal behaviour of luminous output of LEDs are in the doctoral thesis of Perz.

== Root causes ==
The root cause of TLAs is the variation of the light intensity of lighting equipment. Important factors that can contribute and that determine the magnitude and type of light modulation of lighting equipment are:

- Light source technology: LEDs do not intrinsically produce temporal modulation; they just reproduce the input current waveform very well, and any ripple in the current waveform is reproduced by a light ripple because LEDs have a fast response; therefore compared to conventional lighting technologies (incandescent, fluorescent), for LED lighting more variety in the TLA properties is seen.
- Power source technology (driver, electrical ballast): Many types and topologies of LED drivers and electrical ballasts are applied; simpler electronics and limited or no buffer capacitors often result in larger residual current ripple and thus larger temporal light modulation.
- Light regulation: Dimming technologies of either externally applied dimmers (incompatible dimmers) or internal light-level regulators may have a large impact.; the level of temporal light modulation generally increases at lower light levels.
- Mains voltage fluctuations: Electrical mains voltage variations are caused by switching or varying loads of electrical apparatus connected to the mains network, or may be intentionally applied e.g. for power-line communication.
- Visible light communication technologies: Intentional temporal light modulations like LiFi can be applied, e.g. for communication purposes; these additional TLMs may give rise to unwanted TLAs.

== Metrics ==
Several simple metrics such as Modulation Depth, Flicker Index and Flicker Percentage are often used to assess the acceptability of flicker. None of these metrics are suitable to objectively assess the visibility and acceptability of TLAs by humans. Human perception of TLAs is impacted by various factors: modulation depth, frequency, wave shape and duty cycle.

More advanced metrics have been developed and validated to objectively assess the visibility of TLAs:

- for flicker, the short-term flicker indicator P_{st}^{LM},
- for stroboscopic effect, the stroboscopic effect visibility measure SVM.

For flicker also two alternative measures are derived to measure its visibility, the Flicker Visibility Measure FVM and the Time domain Flicker Visibility Measure TFVM.

NOTE - The application of the SVM-metric is limited for human perception of stroboscopic effect in normal application environments (residential, office) where the speed of movement of persons and/or objects is limited. For phantom array effect no metric has been defined yet.

== Measurement methods ==
=== Standardised test and measurement methods ===
- Measurement of P_{st}^{LM}, and optionally testing effect of mains voltage fluctuations or dimming: see IEC TR 61547-1, edition 3;
- Measurement of SVM, and optionally testing effect of dimming: see IEC TR 63158;
- TLA: Test Methods and Guidance for Acceptance Criteria, see NEMA 77-2017;
- Guidance on the measurement of temporal light modulation of light sources and lighting systems: see CIE TN 012

=== Recommended limits ===
Recommended limits for the TLA phenomena flicker and stroboscopic effect are in NEMA 77-2017 publication.

=== Improper use of cameras for TLA assessment ===
If smart-phone phone cameras, video cameras or film cameras are used in presence of temporally modulated light, a variety of artefacts may be seen on the picture or on the recording, e.g. vertical or horizontal banding with varying brightness (this category of unwanted effects is temporal light interference - TLI). However, the type of artefact depends very much on the camera technology and camera settings. Different cameras will show different artefacts depending on type of shutter, picture frame rate and on the mitigation measures taken in the camera. Apart from the possible variety of effects that can be seen, there is also a difference between what people perceive directly compared to what people perceive via a camera and display or monitor. Hence, usage of common cameras is not a valid and objective means to assess the potential TLA from lighting equipment.

== See also ==
- Temporal light effects
- Temporal light interference
- Flicker (light)
- Stroboscopic effect (lighting)
- Stroboscopic effect
