= Temporal light interference =

Temporal light interference (TLI) is an unacceptable degradation of the performance of an equipment or system that has an optical input for its intended functioning and is caused by a temporal light modulation disturbance. A temporal light modulation (TLM) disturbance may be either an intentional or unintentional temporal light modulation (TLM) of lighting equipment such as luminaires or lamps. Examples of equipment that can be interfered are barcode scanners, cameras and test equipment.

NOTE – Temporal light modulations may also annoy human beings. In general, undesired effects in the visual perception of a human observer induced by light intensity fluctuations are called Temporal Light Artefacts (TLAs).

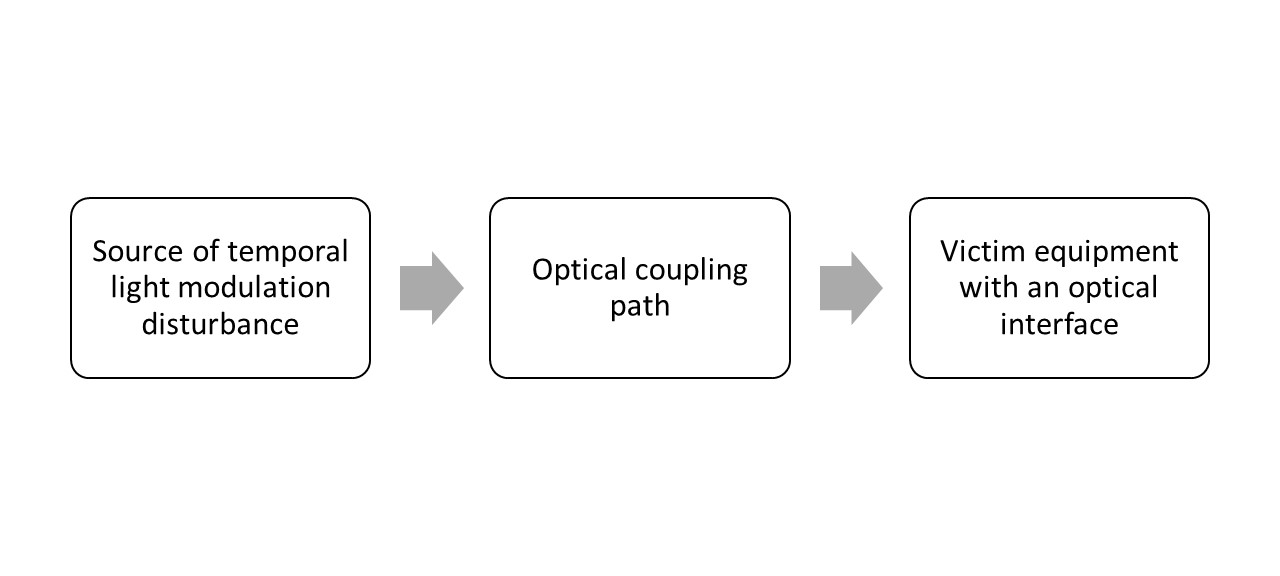
Figure 1: TLI tripyich: temporal light modulations that may interfere equipment.

== Root causes of TLI ==
Temporal light modulation disturbances may arise from fluctuations of the light intensity of lighting equipment. Light emitted from lighting equipment such as luminaires and lamps may vary in strength as function of time, either intentionally or unintentionally (Figure 1). Generally, the light output of lighting equipment has unintentional residual light level modulations due to the lighting equipment itself. The magnitude, shape, periodicity and frequency of the TLM depends on many factors such as the type of light source, the electrical mains-supply frequency, the driver or ballast technology and type of light regulation technology applied (e.g. pulse-width modulation). Conventional incandescent type of lighting equipment typically has a moderate residual light modulation (10%- 20% modulation depth) with a modulation frequency which is twice the mains frequency. LED-type of lighting equipment, because they are semiconductor devices, respond much more rapidly to variations in the input signal than the conventional light sources. Therefore, LED light sources are also much more sensitive to fluctuations in the input current, and reproduce those current fluctuations in the light output, potentially leading to TLI. Furthermore, external factors such as incompatibility with dimmers or presence of mains-supply voltage fluctuations (power-line flicker) play a role and may cause additional temporal light modulations.

TLMs can be designed-in fluctuations from the electronic driver because of application of certain driver or light-regulation technologies. For example, AC-fed drivers or application of pulse-width modulation for light-level regulation cause a fairly high magnitude of modulation. However, LED drivers can also be designed to reduce the residual fluctuations in the current to the LEDs to limit the risk of TLI in specific applications.

Sometimes also intentional light variations are applied, for instance for visible light communication.

== Potential victims of TLI ==
Equipment having an optical interface (Figure 1), that potentially may be interfered by TLM disturbances include:

- Film cameras, both analog and digital
- Smartphone cameras
- Security cameras
- Professional (television) camera's, including high definition camera with super slow motion
- Laser beam-based barcode scanners
- Barcode scanners
- Pulse oximeters
- Infrared remote controls
- Systems for visible light communications

Each of this equipment have an optical interface for their functioning but they employ very different mechanisms, principles and restrictions to process the incoming light. Therefore, there is also a large variety of interference mechanisms. Consequently, there is not a single and simple metric that describes the level of degradation or malfunction of each of these types of equipment.

== Examples of victims of temporal light interference ==
=== Visible Light Communication (VLC) ===
Visible light communication typically uses a common LED light source that is used for illumination and adds a small level of modulation on the DC-light level to transfer data. The receiver can be a specific device using a photodiode as detector, but it is often also a common smartphone camera. Various pulse modulation techniques and data rates can be applied depending on the function of the VLC system. TLM disturbances from sunlight or other ambient lighting can cause interference of the VLC system. VLC systems generally apply specific coding and modulation techniques to achieve robustness against common TLM disturbances.

=== Barcode scanners ===
Barcode scanners are widely used, for instance to improve the efficiency in processing products and clients, such as super market check-out counters, hospital check in, parcel tracking and industrial production statistics. The use of linear (1D) and matrix (2D) barcodes is widespread. TLMs from lighting equipment located in the neighbourhood where barcode scanners are applied can cause TLI.

=== Slow-motion cameras ===
Recordings of slow-motion cameras in environments with temporal light modulations may induce artefacts on displays such as flickering or banding.

== Mitigation of TLI ==
Generally, TLIs can be avoided by reducing the level of TLMs. For example, to avoid the visibility of artefacts on displayed content from slow-motion cameras, the modulation depth of the light modulations must be reduced. The European standard EN 12193 for sport lighting specifies maximum levels of modulation depth (also called flicker factor FF) to obtain flicker-free pictures taken by high-speed cameras. For modulation frequencies below 40 kHz, the modulation depth of the TLM must be less than 1%. The FF of Light modulations above 40 kHz can be more relaxed (less than 5%). Also CIE technical report CIE 083 provides guidance for lighting requirements for both television and film recording in sports applications to avoid TLI and uses flicker factor as metric. CIE 083 states that a lighting installation with a flicker factor less than 1% will not generate TLI for super-slow motion and ultra-slow motion cameras. The UEFA football stadium lighting guide and the FIH Guide for lighting of outdoor hockey facilities are a few examples of lighting performance guides for sports facilities which specify TLM in terms of FF for different quality levels of facilities.

== See also ==
- Temporal light effects
- Temporal light artefacts
