= Stroboscopic effect =

Visual phenomenon

Depending on the frequency of flash, the element appears motionless or rotating in reverse direction.

The stroboscopic effect is a visual phenomenon caused by aliasing that occurs when continuous rotational or other cyclic motion is represented by a series of short or instantaneous samples (as opposed to a continuous view) at a sampling rate close to the period of the motion. It accounts for the "wagon-wheel effect", so-called because in video, spoked wheels (such as on horse-drawn wagons) sometimes appear to be turning backwards.

A strobe fountain, a stream of water droplets falling at regular intervals lit with a strobe light, is an example of the stroboscopic effect being applied to a cyclic motion that is not rotational. When viewed under normal light, this is a normal water fountain. When viewed under a strobe light with its frequency tuned to the rate at which the droplets fall, the droplets appear to be suspended in mid-air. Adjusting the strobe frequency can make the droplets seemingly move slowly up or down.

Depending upon the frequency of illumination there are different names for the visual effect. Up to about 80 hertz or the flicker fusion threshold it is called visible flicker. From about 80 hertz to 2000 hertz it is called the stroboscopic effect (this article). Overlapping in frequency, but from 80 hertz up to about 6500 hertz a third effect exists called the phantom array effect or the ghosting effect, an optical phenomenon caused by rapid eye movements (saccades) of the observer.

Simon Stampfer, who coined the term in his 1833 patent application for his stroboscopische Scheiben (better known as the "phenakistiscope"), explained how the illusion of motion occurs when during unnoticed regular and very short interruptions of light, one figure gets replaced by a similar figure in a slightly different position. Any series of figures can thus be manipulated to show movements in any desired direction.

== Explanation ==
The stroboscope is a device that is commonly used in mechanical analysis. This may be a "strobe light" that is fired at an adjustable rate. For example, an object is rotating at 60 revolutions per second: if it is viewed with a series of short flashes at 60 times per second, each flash illuminates the object at the same position in its rotational cycle, so it appears that the object is stationary. Furthermore, this frequency can be above the flicker fusion threshold and thus smooth out the sequence of flashes so that the perceived image is continuous.

If the same rotating object is viewed at 61 flashes per second, each flash will illuminate it at a slightly earlier part of its rotational cycle. Sixty-one flashes will occur before the object is seen in the same position again, and the series of images will be perceived as if it is rotating backwards once per second.

The same effect occurs if the object is viewed at 59 flashes per second, except that each flash illuminates it a little later in its rotational cycle and so, the object will seem to be rotating forwards.

The same could be applied at other frequencies like the 50 Hz characteristic of electric distribution grids of most of countries in the world.

In the case of motion pictures, action is captured as a rapid series of still images and the same stroboscopic effect can occur.

=== Audio conversion from light patterns ===
The stroboscopic effect also plays a role in audio playback. Compact discs rely on strobing reflections of the laser from the surface of the disc in order to be processed (it is also used for computer data). DVDs and Blu-ray Discs have similar functions.

The stroboscopic effect also plays a role for laser microphones.

== Wagon-wheel effect ==
Propeller of a Bombardier Q400 taken with a digital camera showing the stroboscopic effect

Motion-picture cameras conventionally film at 24 frames per second. Although the wheels of a vehicle are not likely to be turning at 24 revolutions per second (as that would be extremely fast), suppose each wheel has 12 spokes and rotates at only two revolutions per second. Filmed at 24 frames per second, the spokes in each frame will appear in exactly the same position. Hence, the wheel will be perceived to be stationary. In fact, each photographically captured spoke in any one position will be a different actual spoke in each successive frame, but since the spokes are close to identical in shape and color, no difference will be perceived. Thus, as long as the number of times the wheel rotates per second is a factor of 24 and 12, the wheel will appear to be stationary.

If the wheel rotates a little more slowly than two revolutions per second, the position of the spokes is seen to fall a little further behind in each successive frame and therefore, the wheel will seem to be turning backwards.

== Beneficial effects ==
Stroboscopic principles, and their ability to create an illusion of motion, underlie the theory behind animation, cinema, and other moving pictures.

In some special applications, stroboscopic pulsations have benefits. For instance, a stroboscope is tool that produces short repetitive flashes of light that can be used for measurement of movement frequencies or for analysis or timing of moving objects. An automotive timing light is a specialized stroboscope used to manually set the ignition timing of an internal combustion engine.

Stroboscopic visual training (SVT) is a recent tool aimed at improving visual and perceptual performance of sporters by executing activities under conditions of modulated lighting or intermittent vision.

== Unwanted effects in common lighting ==
Stroboscopic effect is one of the particular temporal light artefacts. In common lighting applications, the stroboscopic effect is an unwanted effect which may become visible if a person is looking at a moving or rotating object which is illuminated by a time-modulated light source. The temporal light modulation may come from fluctuations of the light source itself or may be due to the application of certain dimming or light level regulation technologies. Another cause of light modulations may be lamps with unfiltered pulse-width modulation type external dimmers. Whether this is so may be tested with any quickly-rotating object.

=== Effects ===
Various scientific committees have assessed the potential health, performance and safety-related aspects resulting from temporal light modulations (TLMs) including stroboscopic effect. Adverse effects in common lighting application areas include annoyance, reduced task performance, visual fatigue and headache. The visibility aspects of stroboscopic effect are given in a technical note of CIE, see CIE TN 006:2016 and in the thesis of Perz.

Stroboscopic effects may also lead to unsafe situations in workplaces with fast moving or rotating machinery. If the frequency of fast rotating machinery or moving parts coincides with the frequency, or multiples of the frequency, of the light modulation, the machinery can appear to be stationary, or to move with another speed, potentially leading to hazardous situations. Stroboscopic effects that become visible in rotating objects are also referred to as the wagon-wheel effect.

In general, undesired effects in the visual perception of a human observer induced by light intensity fluctuations are called Temporal Light Artefacts (TLAs). Further background and explanations on the different TLA phenomena including stroboscopic effect is given in a recorded webinar “Is it all just flicker?”.

Possible stroboscopic induced medical issues in some people include migraines & headaches, autistic repetitive behaviors, eye strain & fatigue, reduced visual task performance, anxiety and (rarer) epileptic seizures.

=== Root causes ===
Light emitted from lighting equipment such as luminaires and lamps may vary in strength as function of time, either intentionally or unintentionally. Intentional light variations are applied for warning, signalling (e.g. traffic-light signalling, flashing aviation light signals), entertainment (like stage lighting) with the purpose that flicker is perceived by people. Generally, the light output of lighting equipment may also have residual unintentional light level modulations due to the lighting equipment technology in connection with the type of electrical mains connection. For example, lighting equipment connected to a single-phase mains supply will typically have residual TLMs of twice the mains frequency, either at 100 or 120 Hz (depending on country).

The magnitude, shape, periodicity and frequency of the TLMs will depend on many factors such as the type of light source, the electrical mains-supply frequency, the driver or ballast technology and type of light regulation technology applied (e.g. pulse-width modulation). If the modulation frequency is below the flicker fusion threshold and if the magnitude of the TLM exceeds a certain level, then such TLMs are perceived as flicker. Light modulations with modulation frequencies beyond the flicker fusion threshold are not directly perceived, but illusions in the form of stroboscopic effect may become visible (example see Figure 1).

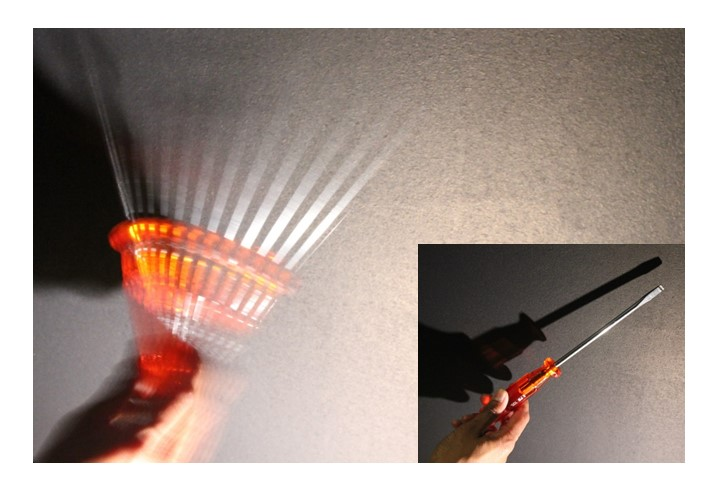
Figure 1: Stroboscopic effect resulting from a moving screwdriver lit with a square-waveform modulated light source with a modulation frequency of 100 Hz, duty cycle of 50 % and 100 % modulation (SVM = 4,9); small photo inset shows absence of stroboscopic effect if screwdriver is not moved

LEDs do not intrinsically produce temporal modulations; they just reproduce the input current waveform very well, and any ripple in the current waveform is reproduced by a light ripple because LEDs have a fast response; therefore, compared to conventional lighting technologies (incandescent, fluorescent), for LED lighting more variety in the TLA properties is seen. Many types and topologies of LED driver circuits are applied; simpler electronics and limited or no buffer capacitors often result in larger residual current ripple and thus larger temporal light modulation.

Dimming technologies of either externally applied dimmers (incompatible dimmers) or internal light-level regulators may have additional impact on the level of stroboscopic effect; the level of temporal light modulation generally increases at lower light levels.

NOTE – The root cause temporal light modulation is often referred to as flicker. Also, stroboscopic effect is often referred to as flicker. Flicker is however a directly visible effect resulting from light modulations at relatively low modulation frequencies, typically below 80 Hz, whereas stroboscopic effect in common (residential) applications may become visible if light modulations are present with modulation frequencies, typically above 80 Hz.

=== Mitigation ===
Generally, undesirable stroboscopic effect can be avoided by reducing the level of TLMs.

Design of lighting equipment to reduce the TLMs of the light sources is typically a tradeoff for other product properties and generally increases cost and size, shortens lifetime or lowers energy efficiency.

For instance, to reduce the modulation in the current to drive LEDs, which also reduces the visibility of TLAs, a large storage capacitor, such as electrolytic capacitor, is required. However, use of such capacitors significantly shortens the lifetime of the LED, as they are found to have the highest failure rate among all components. Another solution to lower the visibility of TLAs is to increase the frequency of the driving current, however this decreases the efficiency of the system and it increases its overall size.

=== Visibility ===
Stroboscopic effect becomes visible if the modulation frequency of the TLM is in the range of 80 Hz to 2000 Hz and if the magnitude of the TLM exceeds a certain level. Other important factors that determine the visibility of TLMs as stroboscopic effect are:

- The shape of the temporary modulated light waveform (e.g. sinusoidal, rectangular pulse and its duty cycle);
- The illumination level of the light source;
- The speed of movement of the moving objects observed;
- Physiological factors such as age and fatigue.

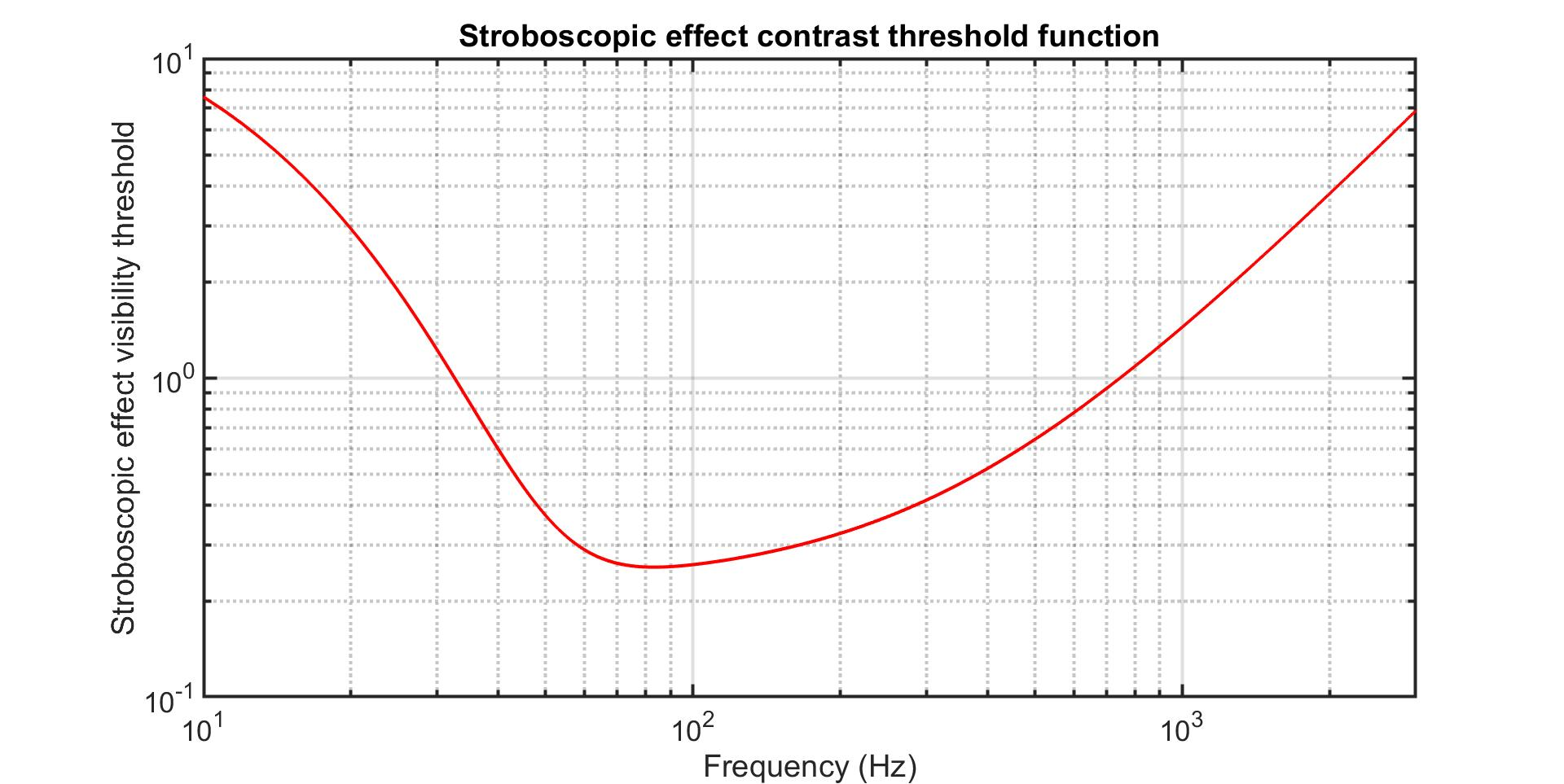
Figure 2: Stroboscopic effect contrast threshold function (see Visibility)

All observer-related influence quantities are stochastic parameters, because not all humans perceive the effect of same light ripple in the same way. That is why perception of stroboscopic effect is always expressed with a certain probability. For light levels encountered in common applications and for moderate speeds of movement of objects (connected to speeds that can be made by humans), an average sensitivity curve has been derived based on perception studies. The average sensitivity curve for sinusoidal modulated light waveforms, also called the stroboscopic effect contrast threshold function, as a function of frequency f is as follows:

$$T(f) = 2.865 \times 10^{-5} \times f^{1.543} + 0.225$$

The contrast threshold function is depicted in Figure 2. Stroboscopic effect becomes visible if the modulation frequency of the TLM is in the region between approximately 10 Hz to 2000 Hz and if the magnitude of the TLM exceeds a certain level. The contrast threshold function shows that at modulation frequencies near 100 Hz, stroboscopic effect will be visible at relatively low magnitudes of modulation. Although stroboscopic effect in theory is also visible in the frequency range below 100 Hz, in practice visibility of flicker will dominate over stroboscopic effect in the frequency range up to 60 Hz. Moreover, large magnitudes of intentional repetitive TLMs with frequencies below 100 Hz are unlikely to occur in practice because residual TLMs generally occur at modulation frequencies that are twice the mains frequency (100 Hz or 120 Hz).

Detailed explanations on the visibility of stroboscopic effect and other temporal light artefacts are also given in CIE TN 006:2016 and in a recorded webinar “Is it all just flicker?”.

=== Objective assessment of stroboscopic effect ===
==== Stroboscopic effect visibility meter ====
For objective assessment of stroboscopic effect the stroboscopic effect visibility measure (SVM) has been developed. The specification of the stroboscopic effect visibility meter and the test method for objective assessment of lighting equipment is published in IEC technical report IEC TR 63158. SVM is calculated using the following summation formula:

$$SVM=\sqrt[3.7]{\textstyle \sum_{m=1}^\infty \displaystyle\left ( \frac{C_m}{T_m} \right )^{3.7}},$$

where C_{m} is the relative amplitude of the m-th Fourier component (trigonometric Fourier series representation) of the relative illuminance (relative to the DC-level);

T_{m} is the stroboscopic effect contrast threshold function for visibility of stroboscopic effect of a sine wave at the frequency of the m-th Fourier component (see § Visibility). SVM can be used for objective assessment by a human observer of visible stroboscopic effects of temporal light modulation of lighting equipment in general indoor applications, with typical indoor light levels (> 100 lx) and with moderate movements of an observer or a nearby handled object (< 4 m/s). For assessing unwanted stroboscopic effects in other applications, such as the misperception of rapidly rotating or moving machinery in a workshop for example, other metrics and methods can be required or the assessment can be done by subjective testing (observation).

NOTE – Several alternative metrics such as modulation depth, flicker percentage or flicker index are being applied for specifying the stroboscopic effect performance of lighting equipment. None of these metrics are suitable to predict actual human perception because human perception is impacted by modulation depth, modulation frequency, wave shape and if applicable the duty cycle of the TLM.

==== Matlab toolbox ====
A Matlab stroboscopic effect visibility measure toolbox including a function for calculating SVM and some application examples are available on the Matlab Central via the Mathworks Community.

==== Acceptance criterion ====
If the value of SVM equals one, the input modulation of the light waveform produces a stroboscopic effect that is just visible, i.e. at the visibility threshold. This means that an average observer will be able to detect the artefact with a probability of 50%. If the value of the visibility measure is above unity, the effect has a probability of detection of more than 50%. If the value of the visibility measure is smaller than unity, the probability of detection is less than 50%. These visibility thresholds show the average detection of an average human observer in a population. This does not, however, guarantee acceptability. For some less critical applications, the acceptability level of an artefact might be well above the visibility threshold. For other applications, the acceptable levels might be below the visibility threshold. NEMA 77-2017 amongst others gives guidance for acceptance criteria in different applications.

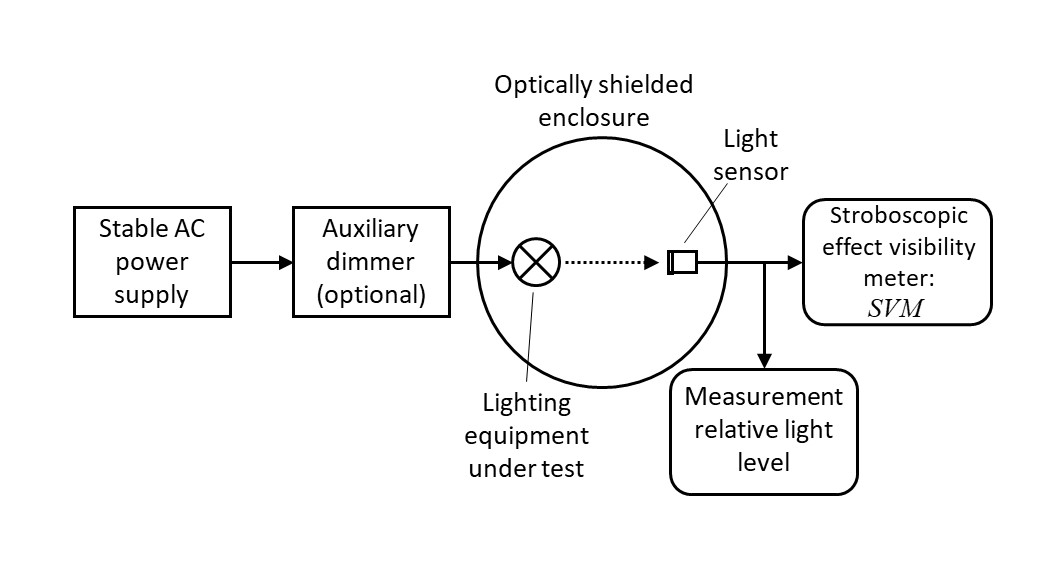
Figure 3: Generic setup to test lighting equipment for its stroboscopic effect performance

==== Test and measurement applications ====
A typical test setup for stroboscopic effect testing is shown in Figure 3. The stroboscopic effect visibility meter can be applied for different purposes (see IEC TR 63158):

- Measurement of the intrinsic stroboscopic-effect performance of lighting equipment when supplied with a stable mains voltage;
- Testing the effect of light regulation of lighting equipment or the effect of an external dimmer (dimmer compatibility).

=== Publication of standards development organisations ===
1. CIE TN 006:2016: introduces terms, definitions, methodologies and measures for quantification of TLAs including stroboscopic effect.
2. IEC TR 63158:2018: includes the stroboscopic effect visibility meter specification and verification method, and test procedures a.o. for dimmer compatibility.
3. NEMA 77-2017: amongst others, flicker test Methods and guidance for acceptance criteria.

== Dangers in workplaces ==
Stroboscopic effect may lead to unsafe situations in workplaces with fast moving or rotating machinery. If the frequency of fast rotating machinery or moving parts coincides with the frequency, or multiples of the frequency, of the light modulation, the machinery can appear to be stationary, or to move with another speed, potentially leading to hazardous situations.

Because of the illusion that the stroboscopic effect can give to moving machinery, it is advised that single-phase lighting is avoided. For example, a factory that is lit from a single-phase supply with basic lighting will have a flicker of 100 or 120 Hz (depending on country, 50 Hz x 2 in Europe, 60 Hz x 2 in US, double the nominal frequency), thus any machinery rotating at multiples of 50 or 60 Hz (3000–3600rpm) may appear to not be turning, increasing the risk of injury to an operator. Solutions include deploying the lighting over a full 3-phase supply, or by using high-frequency controllers that drive the lights at safer frequencies or direct current lighting.

The 100/120 Hertz stroboscopic effect in commercial lighting may lead to disruptive issues and non-productive results in workspaces such as hospitals & medical facilities, industrial facilities, offices, schools or video conferencing rooms.

== See also ==
- 3D zoetrope
- Electronic tuner § Strobe tuners
- Temporal light artefacts
- Temporal light effects
- Flicker (light)
- Flicker fusion threshold
