= Aliasing =

Signal processing effect

examples of aliasing

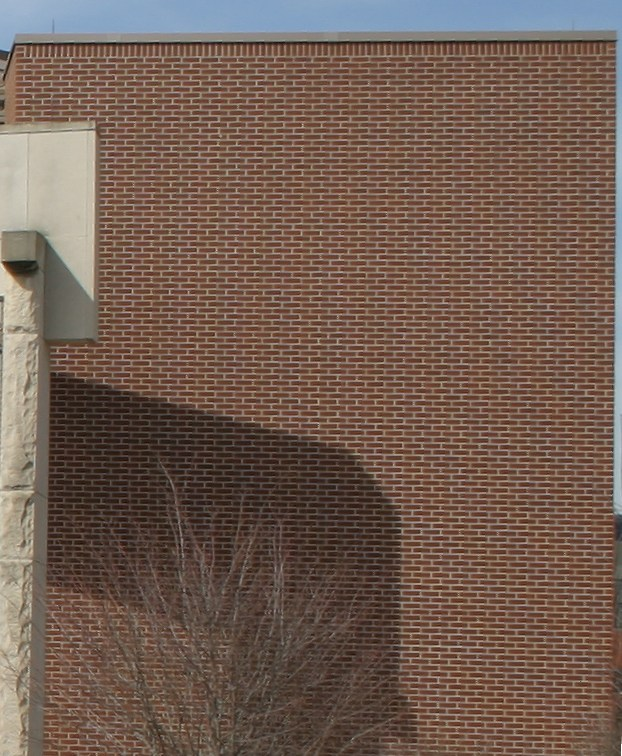
This full-sized image shows what a properly sampled image of a brick wall should look like with a screen of sufficient resolution.

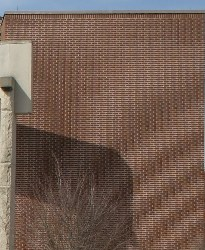
When the resolution is reduced without proper filtering, aliasing appears in the form of a moiré pattern.

A physical motion of a camera at a constant shutter speed may create temporal aliasing known as the wagon wheel effect. The velocity of the camera, moving towards the right, constantly increases at the same rate (while to the camera, the objects appear sliding to the left). Halfway through the 24-second loop, the objects appear to suddenly shift and head in the reverse direction, towards the right.

In digital signal processing, aliasing is a phenomenon in which a reconstructed signal from samples of the original signal contains low frequency components that are not present in the original one. This is caused when, in the original signal, there are components at frequency exceeding a certain frequency called Nyquist frequency, $f_\text{s} / 2$, where $f_\text{s}$ is the sampling frequency (undersampling). This is because typical reconstruction methods use low frequency components while there are a number of frequency components, called aliases, which sampling result in the identical sample. It also often refers to the distortion or artifact that results when a signal reconstructed from samples is different from the original continuous signal.

Aliasing can occur in signals sampled in time, for instance in digital audio or the stroboscopic effect, and is referred to as temporal aliasing. Aliasing in spatially sampled signals (e.g., moiré patterns in digital images) is referred to as spatial aliasing.

Aliasing is generally avoided by applying low-pass filters or anti-aliasing filters (AAF) to the input signal before sampling and when converting a signal from a higher to a lower sampling rate. Suitable reconstruction filtering should then be used when restoring the sampled signal to the continuous domain or converting a signal from a lower to a higher sampling rate. For spatial anti-aliasing, the types of anti-aliasing include fast approximate anti-aliasing (FXAA), multisample anti-aliasing (MSAA), and supersampling. Temporal anti-aliasing is a special case of MSAA where pixel samples are collected over multiple frames.

== Description ==
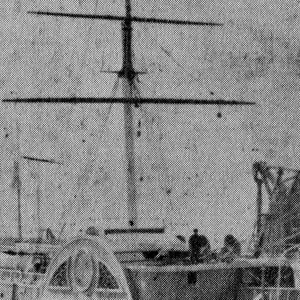
Dots in the sky due to spatial aliasing caused by halftone resized to a lower resolution

When a digital image is viewed, a reconstruction is performed by a display or printer device. If the image data is processed incorrectly during sampling or reconstruction, the reconstructed image will differ from the original image, and an alias is seen.

An example of spatial aliasing is the moiré pattern observed in a poorly pixelized image of a brick wall. Spatial anti-aliasing techniques avoid such poor pixelizations. Aliasing can be caused either by the sampling stage or the reconstruction stage; these may be distinguished by calling sampling aliasing prealiasing and reconstruction aliasing postaliasing.

Temporal aliasing is a major concern in the sampling of video and audio signals. Music, for instance, may contain high-frequency components that are outside human's hearing range and hence inaudible. If a piece of music is sampled at 32,000 samples per second (Hz), any frequency components at or above 16,000 Hz (the Nyquist frequency for this sampling rate) will cause aliasing when the music is reproduced by a digital-to-analog converter (DAC). The high frequencies in the analog signal will appear as lower frequencies (wrong alias) in the recorded digital sample and, hence, cannot be reproduced by the DAC. To prevent this, an anti-aliasing filter is used to remove components above the Nyquist frequency prior to sampling.

In video or cinematography, temporal aliasing results from the limited frame rate, and causes the wagon-wheel effect, whereby a spoked wheel appears to rotate too slowly or even backwards. Aliasing has changed its apparent frequency of rotation. A reversal of direction can be described as a negative frequency. Temporal aliasing frequencies in video and cinematography are determined by the frame rate of the camera, but the relative intensity of the aliased frequencies is determined by the shutter timing (exposure time) or the use of a temporal aliasing reduction filter during filming.

Like the video camera, most sampling schemes are periodic; that is, they have a characteristic sampling frequency in time or in space. Digital cameras provide a certain number of samples (pixels) per degree or per radian, or samples per mm in the focal plane of the camera. Audio signals are sampled (digitized) with an analog-to-digital converter, which produces a constant number of samples per second. Some of the most dramatic and subtle examples of aliasing occur when the signal being sampled also has periodic content.

== Bandlimited functions ==
Actual signals have a finite duration and their frequency content, as defined by the Fourier transform, has no upper bound. Some amount of aliasing always occurs when such continuous functions over time are sampled. Functions whose frequency content is bounded (bandlimited) have an infinite duration in the time domain. If sampled at a high enough rate, determined by the bandwidth, the original function can, in theory, be perfectly reconstructed from the infinite set of samples.

== Bandpass signals ==
Sometimes aliasing is used intentionally on signals with no low-frequency content, called bandpass signals. Undersampling, which creates low-frequency aliases, can produce the same result, with less effort, as frequency-shifting the signal to lower frequencies before sampling at the lower rate. Some digital channelizers exploit aliasing in this way for computational efficiency. (See Sampling (signal processing), Nyquist rate (relative to sampling), and Filter bank.)

== Sampling sinusoidal functions ==
Fig.2 Upper left: Animation depicts a sequence of sinusoids, each with a higher frequency $f$ than the previous ones. These "true" signals are also being sampled (blue dots) at a constant sampling frequency or rate $f_\text{s}$. Upper right: The continuous Fourier transform of the sinusoid (not the samples). The single non-zero component, depicting the actual frequency, means that there is no ambiguity. Lower right: The discrete Fourier transform of just the available samples. The presence of two components means that the samples can fit at least two different sinusoids, one of which is with the true frequency (upper-right). Another sinusoid is with an alias frequency $f-f_\text{s}$. (Here the absolute value of it is shown.) Lower left: Using the same samples (now in orange), the default reconstruction algorithm produces the lower-frequency sinusoid.

Sinusoids are an important type of periodic function, because realistic signals are often modeled as the summation of many sinusoids of different frequencies and different amplitudes (for example, with a Fourier series or transform). Understanding what aliasing does to the individual sinusoids is useful in understanding what happens to their sum.

When sampling a function at frequency f_{s} (i.e., the sampling interval is 1/f_{s}), the following functions of time (t) yield identical sets of samples if the sampling starts from $t=0$ such that $t=\frac{1}{f_\text{s}}n$ where $n = 0,1,2,3$, and so on:

$$\{ \sin(2\pi(f+Nf_\text{s})t+\varphi), N=0,\pm1,\pm2,\pm3, \ldots \}.$$

A frequency spectrum of the samples produces equally strong responses at all those frequencies. Without collateral information, the frequency of the original function is ambiguous. So, the functions and their frequencies are said to be aliases of each other. Noting the sine functions as odd functions:

$$\sin(2\pi (f+Nf_\text{s})t + \varphi) = \begin{cases}
+\sin(2\pi (f+Nf_\text{s})t + \varphi),
& f+Nf_\text{s} \ge 0 \\
-\sin(2\pi |f+Nf_\text{s}|t - \varphi),
& f+Nf_\text{s} < 0 \\
\end{cases}$$

thus, we can write all the alias frequencies as positive values: $f_{_N}(f) \triangleq \left|f+Nf_\text{s}\right|$. For example, a snapshot of the lower right frame of Fig.2 shows a component at the actual frequency $f$ and another component at alias $f_{_{-1}}(f)$. As $f$ increases during the animation, $f_{_{-1}}(f)$ decreases. The point at which they are equal $(f=f_\text{s}/2)$ is an axis of symmetry called the folding frequency, also known as Nyquist frequency.

Aliasing matters when one attempts to reconstruct the original waveform from its samples. The most common reconstruction technique produces the smallest of the $f_{_N}(f)$ frequencies. So, it is usually important that $f_0(f)$ be the unique minimum. A necessary and sufficient condition for that is $f_\text{s}/2 > |f|,$ called the Nyquist condition. The lower left frame of Fig.2 depicts the typical reconstruction result of the available samples. Until $f$ exceeds the Nyquist frequency, the reconstruction matches the actual waveform (upper left frame). After that, it is the low frequency alias of the upper frame.

=== Folding ===
The figures below offer additional depictions of aliasing, due to sampling. A graph of amplitude vs frequency (not time) for a single sinusoid at frequency 0.6 f_{s} and some of its aliases at 0.4 f_{s}, 1.4 f_{s}, and 1.6 f_{s} would look like the 4 black dots in Fig.3. The red lines depict the paths (loci) of the 4 dots if we were to adjust the frequency and amplitude of the sinusoid along the solid red segment (between f_{s}/2 and f_{s}). No matter what function we choose to change the amplitude vs frequency, the graph will exhibit symmetry between 0 and f_{s}. Folding is often observed in practice when viewing the frequency spectrum of real-valued samples, such as Fig.4.

Fig.3: The black dots are aliases of each other. The solid red line is an example of amplitude varying with frequency. The dashed red lines are the corresponding paths of the aliases.

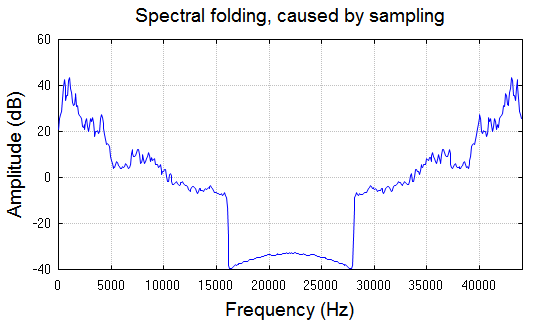
Fig.4: The Fourier transform of music sampled at 44,100 samples/sec exhibits symmetry (called "folding") around the Nyquist frequency (22,050 Hz).

Fig.5: Graph of frequency aliasing, showing folding frequency and periodicity. Frequencies above f_{s}/2 have an alias below f_{s}/2, whose value is given by this graph.

Two complex sinusoids, colored gold and cyan, that fit the same sets of real and imaginary sample points when sampled at the rate (f_{s}) indicated by the grid lines. The case shown here is: f_{cyan} = f_{_{−1}}(f_{gold}) = f_{gold} – f_{s}

=== Complex sinusoids ===
Complex sinusoids are waveforms whose samples are complex numbers ($z = Ae ^{i\theta } = A(\cos \theta + i\sin \theta)$), and the concept of negative frequency is necessary to distinguish them. In that case, the frequencies of the aliases are given by just: f_{_{N}}( f ) = f + N f_{s}. (In real sinusoids, as shown in the above, all alias frequencies can be written as positive frequencies $f_{_N}(f) \triangleq \left|f+Nf_\text{s}\right|$ because of sine functions as odd functions.) Therefore, as f increases from 0 to f_{s}, f_{_{−1}}( f ) also increases (from –f_{s} to 0). Consequently, complex sinusoids do not exhibit folding.

=== Sample frequency ===
Illustration of 4 waveforms reconstructed from samples taken at six different rates. Two of the waveforms are sufficiently sampled to avoid aliasing at all six rates. The other two illustrate increasing distortion (aliasing) at the lower rates.

When the condition f_{s}/2 > f is met for the highest frequency component of the original signal, then it is met for all the frequency components, a condition called the Nyquist criterion. That is typically approximated by filtering the original signal to attenuate high frequency components before it is sampled. These attenuated high frequency components still generate low-frequency aliases, but typically at low enough amplitudes that they do not cause problems. A filter chosen in anticipation of a certain sample frequency is called an anti-aliasing filter.

The filtered signal can subsequently be reconstructed, by interpolation algorithms, without significant additional distortion. Most sampled signals are not simply stored and reconstructed. But the fidelity of a theoretical reconstruction (via the Whittaker–Shannon interpolation formula) is a customary measure of the effectiveness of sampling.

== Historical usage ==
Historically the term aliasing evolved from radio engineering because of the action of superheterodyne receivers. When the receiver shifts multiple signals down to lower frequencies, from RF to IF by heterodyning, an unwanted signal, from an RF frequency equally far from the local oscillator (LO) frequency as the desired signal, but on the wrong side of the LO, can end up at the same IF frequency as the wanted one. If it is strong enough it can interfere with reception of the desired signal. This unwanted signal is known as an image or alias of the desired signal.

The first written use of the terms "alias" and "aliasing" in signal processing appears to be in a 1949 unpublished Bell Laboratories technical memorandum by John Tukey and Richard Hamming. That paper includes an example of frequency aliasing dating back to 1922. The first published use of the term "aliasing" in this context is due to Blackman and Tukey in 1958. In their preface to the Dover reprint of this paper, they point out that the idea of aliasing had been illustrated graphically by Stumpf ten years prior.

The 1949 Bell technical report refers to aliasing as though it is a well-known concept, but does not offer a source for the term. Gwilym Jenkins and Maurice Priestley credit Tukey with introducing it in this context, though an analogous concept of aliasing had been introduced a few years earlier in fractional factorial designs. While Tukey did significant work in factorial experiments and was certainly aware of aliasing in fractional designs, it cannot be determined whether his use of "aliasing" in signal processing was consciously inspired by such designs.

== Angular aliasing ==
Aliasing occurs whenever the use of discrete elements to capture or produce a continuous signal causes frequency ambiguity.

Spatial aliasing, particular of angular frequency, can occur when reproducing a light field or sound field with discrete elements, as in 3D displays or wave field synthesis of sound.

This aliasing is visible in images such as posters with lenticular printing: if they have low angular resolution, then as one moves past them, say from left-to-right, the 2D image does not initially change (so it appears to move left), then as one moves to the next angular image, the image suddenly changes (so it jumps right) – and the frequency and amplitude of this side-to-side movement corresponds to the angular resolution of the image (and, for frequency, the speed of the viewer's lateral movement), which is the angular aliasing of the 4D light field.

The lack of parallax on viewer movement in 2D images and in 3-D film produced by stereoscopic glasses (in 3D films the effect is called "yawing", as the image appears to rotate on its axis) can similarly be seen as loss of angular resolution, all angular frequencies being aliased to 0 (constant).

== More examples ==
=== Audio example ===
Sawtooth aliasing demo
440 Hz bandlimited, 440 Hz aliased, 880 Hz bandlimited, 880 Hz aliased, 1760 Hz bandlimited, 1760 Hz aliased

The qualitative effects of aliasing can be heard in the following audio demonstration. Six sawtooth waves are played in succession, with the first two sawtooths having a fundamental frequency of 440 Hz (A4), the second two having fundamental frequency of 880 Hz (A5), and the final two at 1760 Hz (A6). The sawtooths alternate between bandlimited (non-aliased) sawtooths and aliased sawtooths and the sampling rate is 22050 Hz. The bandlimited sawtooths are synthesized from the sawtooth waveform's Fourier series such that no harmonics above the Nyquist frequency (11025 Hz = 22050 Hz / 2 here) are present.

The aliasing distortion in the lower frequencies is increasingly obvious with higher fundamental frequencies, and while the bandlimited sawtooth is still clear at 1760 Hz, the aliased sawtooth is degraded and harsh with a buzzing audible at frequencies lower than the fundamental.

=== Direction finding ===
A form of spatial aliasing can also occur in antenna arrays or microphone arrays used to estimate the direction of arrival of a wave signal, as in geophysical exploration by seismic waves. Waves must be sampled more densely than two points per wavelength, or the wave arrival direction becomes ambiguous.

== See also ==
- Brillouin zone
- Glossary of video terms
- Jaggies
- Kell factor
- Sinc filter
- Sinc function
- Spectral density
- Spectral leakage
- Stroboscopic effect
- Wagon-wheel effect
- Nyquist–Shannon sampling theorem § Critical frequency
