= Power-line flicker =

Fluctuations in power supply voltage

Flickering of all dimmer-controlled lighting, arising from external sources coupled via a shared utility transformer

Power-line flicker is a visible change in brightness of a lamp due to rapid fluctuations in the voltage of the power supply. The voltage drop is generated over the source impedance of the grid by the changing load current of an equipment or facility. These fluctuations in time generate flicker. The effects can range from disturbance to epileptic attacks of photosensitive persons. Flicker may also affect sensitive electronic equipment such as television receivers or industrial processes relying on constant electrical power.

== Causes ==
Flicker may be produced, for example, if a steel mill uses large electric motors or arc furnaces on a distribution network, or frequent starting of an elevator motor in an office building, or if a rural residence has a large water pump starting regularly on a long feeder system. The likelihood of flicker increases as the size of the changing load becomes larger with respect to the prospective short-circuit current available at the point of common connection.

== Measurement of flicker ==
The requirements of a flicker measurement equipment are defined in the international electro-technical standard IEC 61000-4-15.

A flickermeter is composed of several function blocks which simulate a 230 V/60 W or a 120 V/60 W incandescent lamp (reference lamp) and the human perception system (eye-brain model).

From the resulting momentary value of flicker the short term flicker "perceptibility" value P_{st} is calculated according to a statistical process over a standardized 10-minute observation interval. Long term flicker P_{lt} is calculated as the cubic mean of several P_{st} values over a standardized two-hour period.

The perceptibility value calculation and scaling algorithm were chosen such that a P value of 1.0 corresponds to a level at which 50% of test subjects found the flicker to be both noticeable and irritating.

In the standard IEC 61000-3-3 the observation intervals and the limiting values for P_{st} and P_{lt} are specified:

Value	Observation Interval	Limiting Value
P_{st}	10 min	1.0
P_{lt}	2 h	0.65

== Operating condition of the EUT ==
The IEC-flicker standard states that the EUT (Equipment Under Test) has to be operated during the test in a way which is the worst case state with respect to flicker. If the EUT is operated in a (relatively) constant fashion during the whole test, P_{lt} = P_{st} will result. If this state is feasible and realistic this means P_{st} has to fulfill the limits for P_{lt} (which are lower). The technical report IEC TR 61547-1 defines the functions and methodology of a light flickermeter. The report details perceptibility values measurements according to the luminous flux of different types of lamps.

== Estimation ==
A purely analytical calculation of P_{st} is almost impossible. In the standard there are formulas which allow the estimation of the P_{st} values to be expected.

== Flicker mitigation ==
Flicker is generated by load changes. Only the amplitude of the load change is relevant, not the absolute value. A reduction in flicker can be attained through making less frequent load changes, or smaller load changes. If the load is changed gradually (for example, by the help of power electronics) instead of step fashion, this also makes flicker less perceptible.

The relationship between amplitude of load changes and P_{st} is linear, i.e. halving the switched load results in half the P_{st}. The relationship between number of load changes per time (n/ Tp) and P_{st} is non-linear. A halving of load changes reduces P_{st} by only about 20%. In order to have half the P_{st}, the number of load changes must be reduced by a factor of 9.

== See also ==
- Power quality
