= People v. Muybridge =

1875 murder case in California

- Court: Seventh District Court of California
- Full case name: The People of the State of California v. Edward J. Muybridge
- Decided: February 6, 1875

In 1874, photographer Eadweard Muybridge killed Harry Larkyns in Calistoga, California, believing that Larkyns had seduced Muybridge's wife and fathered the son Muybridge believed was his own. At trial, the jury, disregarding the judge's instructions, returned a verdict of not guilty on the grounds of justifiable homicide.

== Murder and circumstances ==
On 20 May 1871, 41-year-old Muybridge married 21-year-old divorcee Flora Shallcross Stone (née Downs). Muybridge was often away from home to photograph faraway places.

Shortly after the murder, it was reported that "Major" Harry Larkyns, a reporter for the Evening Post and a friend of the Muybridges, had been romantically involved with Flora. Muybridge had received evidence for the ongoing affair from Mrs. Smith, a mutual friend and the maternity nurse who helped when Flora gave birth to Florado Helios Muybridge (born 14 April 1874).

On 17 October, Muybridge went to Calistoga and tracked down Larkyns, who had found a new job photographing mines. Muybridge called Larkyns to the door of his hotel before killing Larkyns with a point-blank pistol-shot close to the heart. Muybridge calmly surrendered himself to the superintendent and was brought to Calistoga to be given in charge of the authorities. He awaited his trial in the Napa jail.

== The trial ==
There was much interest in the case and the public generally sympathized with Muybridge. Among the many spectators were numerous friends of Muybridge, as well as people who wished to see Larkyns' name cleared and the murderer punished. Another newspaper stated that Mrs. Muybridge fully sympathized with the prosecution of her husband. Flora had filed for divorce on 17 December on the ground of extreme cruelty, but this first petition was dismissed.

Judge F.W. Wallace presided. Judge Thomas P. Stoney and district attorney D. Spencer represented the prosecution. The defense was led by W.W. Pendergast (a friend of Leland Stanford), with Cameron H. King and E.S. Gottschalk as assistant counsel. The defendant had pleaded "not guilty", with the defense admitting to the murder but pleading for an acquittal on grounds of insanity.

A jury of twelve men had been assembled with little difficulty, in a very short time. At the time women were excluded from juries in the United States.

=== The prosecution ===
Hearings of witnesses confirmed almost everything that had been related in the local press. Eyewitness James M. McArthur, who had brought Muybridge to the authorities, told how Muybridge had calmly and spontaneously discussed how he had planned everything, had no regrets and believed men of family would understand his choice. Muybridge had arranged his affairs in case he himself would get killed or lynched, but made sure that Larkyns had little chance to defend himself.

The defense argued against the insanity plea. It was impossible that Muybridge had gone insane after receiving proof for his dishonor, if he afterwards had quietly conversed with witness Harry Edwards and informed about business options. In his closing address, Stoney stated that there was not the least conclusive evidence of insanity. The expert witness for the defense had argued that Muybridge had not been insane and the conclusion was incontrovertible. Muybridge was either guilty of murder in the first degree or should be set free. By law, adultery was no justifiable provocation for murder. The law provided penalties for crimes if proven and Larkyns had received no trial from Muybridge. Muybridge had deliberately committed the murder and ignored the law, without any irresistible impulse or insanity as an excuse.

=== The defense ===
Muybridge's attorneys intended to prove that Larkyns had been a man of bad character and deserved his fate. Larkyns seduced Mrs. Muybridge under false pretenses, claiming to be a married man and luring Flora to his lodgings. He boasted about it to friends. Learning about the depth of the deceit made Muybridge insane from anger, to the point that he passionately decided to kill the destroyer of his happiness, loving his wife deeply, only living for her. Muybridge had been prone to insanity since a stagecoach accident in 1860, his hair had turned grey in three days and he never was the same ever since.

Susan C. Smith, a maternity nurse who was well acquainted with the Muybridges and with Larkyns, testified that she had known about the relationship between Mrs. Muybridge and Larkyns. She gave several examples that implied that the couple thought that Florado was actually Larkyns' son. She had received letters from Mrs. Muybridge and Larkyns that proved their ongoing affair and had offered them to Muybridge to convince him to pay a debt. Muybridge had found the baby picture with "Harry" on the back at her place. The letters and the picture were introduced as evidence.

Muybridge testified about how he had sustained head injuries in a stagecoach accident in July 1860. He had been unconscious for nine days and woke up with double vision and loss of taste and smell. The problems persisted fully for three months and in a lesser extent for a year.

All the witnesses related incidents that illustrated Muybridge's eccentricities. Mrs. Smith told how one day Muybridge came home, looked happily at his wife and child, then suddenly got confused over who had fed the canaries. After being told that he himself had done so, he replied "Ah dear me, I feel bad here sometimes" while pointing at his forehead. Rulofson referred to a picture of Muybridge sitting on the edge of a rock in Yosemite, where he could easily fall 2,000 feet. Rulofson, portrait photographer Silas Selleck and several other friends and long-time acquaintances testified that Muybridge's personality was dramatically changed after his 1860 stagecoach accident and consequent stay in Europe. He had turned from a genial, pleasant and quick business man into an unstable and erratic photographer. After the accident, Muybridge had occasionally been very violent and excitedly rude. McArthur related how Muybridge had been very cool and collected since right after the murder and had taken hold of a glass steadily when he was allowed to join the people having drinks at the Yellow Jacket ranch. This calmness had surprised McArthur, but he had not noticed anything unusual about Muybridge otherwise. Rulofson was called back and related that Muybridge had fallen about his neck and wept and had said he was very sorry, but straight afterwards recollected himself and denied the excitement. Rulofson had only experienced such paroxysms with Muybridge when it concerned his wife and his honor.

Dr. Shurtleff, an expert on insanity, believed that the homicide was premeditated and that Muybridge had been aware of possible consequences. The act had seemed justified to Muybridge and didn't come from an irresistible impulse, but from a passion. There were no reasons to believe that Muybridge was insane.

In his two-hour closing address, W.W. Pendegast's asked the jury, at the request of the defendant, to either acquit Muybridge for any crime or to send him to the gallows, like the district attorney had proposed. Although the law did not offer a statute "permitting a man to slay his injurer. But, law or no law, every fiber in a man's frame impels him to instant vengeance" at all cost. Muybridge had not just killed Larkyns for revenge, but also to protect his wife against the debauchee who kept pursuing her, as evidenced in Larkyns' letter.

=== Verdict ===
The judge gave the jury four optional verdicts to choose from: "guilty of murder in the first degree" punishable by death, another conviction for murder with punishment by lifelong imprisonment, "not guilty" or "not guilty on account of insanity". He also pointedly instructed the jury that even if Larkyns had seduced Muybridge's wife, the defendant was not justified to take the law into his own hands. After a long first jury meeting, they stood five for conviction and seven for acquittal, before retiring for the night at 23:00. The next morning they arrived at the agreement that the murder was justified, but they could not immediately decide whether or not Muybridge had acted out of insanity. The eventual acquittal was explained by arguing that if their verdict was not in accordance with the law, it was in accordance with the law of human nature. They felt they could not punish a person for doing something that they themselves would do in similar circumstances.

Upon hearing the verdict, Muybridge burst out in wordless moaning and convulsive, childlike weeping and fell into Pendegast's lap. The frightful display of emotion was said to have been "seldom, if ever, been witnessed in a court of justice". Muybridge was subsequently set free.

== Public opinion and press coverage ==
The trial was covered in great detail by California newspapers, including verbatim publication of Larkyns' and Mrs. Muybridge's letters (with irrelevant portions left out). According to the Sacramento Daily Union, nearly everyone in Napa believed that Muybridge would be acquitted and sympathized with him. The courtroom had been crowded and spectators applauded wildly after Pendegast's closing address. This led to the arrest of one man, but he was soon let go after he pointed out that he had just done like anyone else.

News of the verdict soon spread and Muybridge was greeted by a cheering crowd. The New York Sun even claimed that "the town was never before in such a feverish excitement" and that only a very small minority "contended that his acquittal was in defiance of the law" (although agreeing that Muybridge did not deserve severe punishment).

It had been some time since an insanity plea had been reported and many US newspapers scorned the idea. In general, they praised the bold justifiable homicide verdict. However, the New-York Tribune strongly disagreed and argued that no social inconvenience and no difficulty in obtaining regular convictions was an excuse to set a precedent for permitting "lynch law".

The Nebraska advertiser argued that since the love affair had been "mutually agreeable", Mrs. Muybridge was "as much to blame for Larkyns' downfall, as he was guilty of her seduction.(...) in a great majority of such cases, the woman is the guiltier party."

News about the murder and the remarkable verdict was spread throughout the United States and abroad. Although he was already a relatively famous photographer in California, he was not that well-known elsewhere and just referred to as "a man named Muybridge". The case received much more press coverage than his pictures ever did, until his The Horse in Motion series impressed the world in 1878.

== Aftermath ==
The episode interrupted Muybridge's photography studies. In 1873 he had first captured a fuzzy image of Leland Stanford's racehorse at full speed and he had promised to look for a way to procure better results. The murder did not harm his relationship with Stanford, who had arranged for his criminal defense. Shortly after his acquittal, Muybridge left the United States on a previously planned 9-month photography trip to Central America, as a "working exile". By 1877, he had resumed work for Stanford.

Flora's second petition received a favourable ruling, and an order for alimony was entered in April 1875. Flora died suddenly in July 1875 while Muybridge was in Central America.

Flora had placed Florado (later nicknamed "Floddie" by friends), with a French couple. In 1876, Muybridge had the boy moved from a Catholic orphanage to a Protestant one and paid for his care. Otherwise he had little to do with him. In 1944, Florado was hit by a car in Sacramento and killed, at approximately the age of 70.

== Legacy ==
The court case and transcripts are important to forensic neurologists, because of the sworn testimony from multiple witnesses regarding Muybridge's state of mind and past behaviour.

The American composer Philip Glass composed an opera, The Photographer, with a libretto based in part on court transcripts from the case.
