= The Photographer (opera) =

1982 chamber opera by Philip Glass

- Chamber opera by Philip Glass
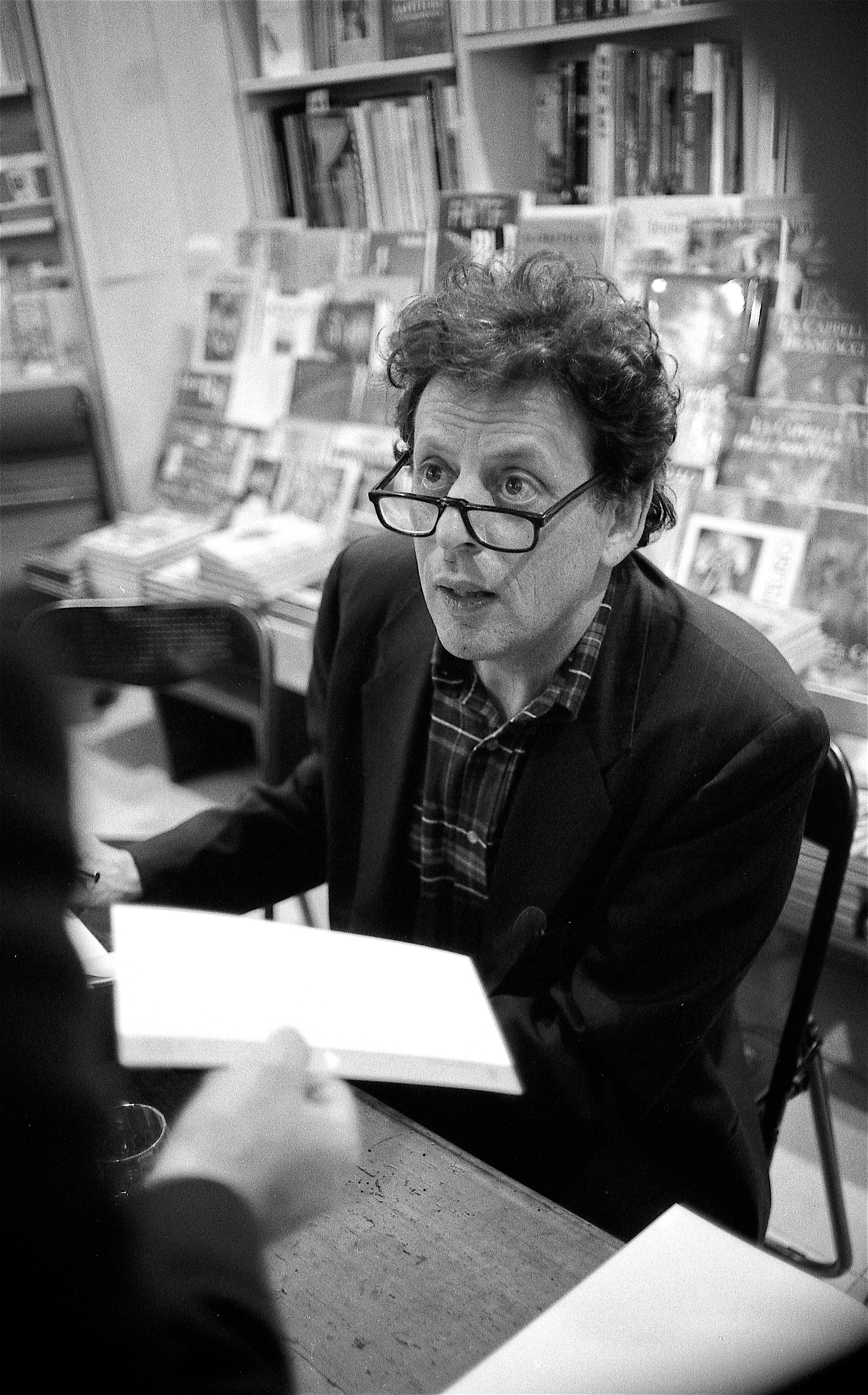
- The composer in 1993
- Librettist: David Byrne
- Based on: life of Eadweard Muybridge
- Premiere: 1982; Holland Festival, Amsterdam

The Photographer is a three-part mixed media performance accompanied by music (also sometimes referred to as a chamber opera) by composer Philip Glass. The libretto is based on the life and homicide trial of 19th-century English photographer Eadweard Muybridge. Commissioned by the Holland Festival, the opera was first performed in 1982 at the Royal Palace of Amsterdam.

== Subject ==
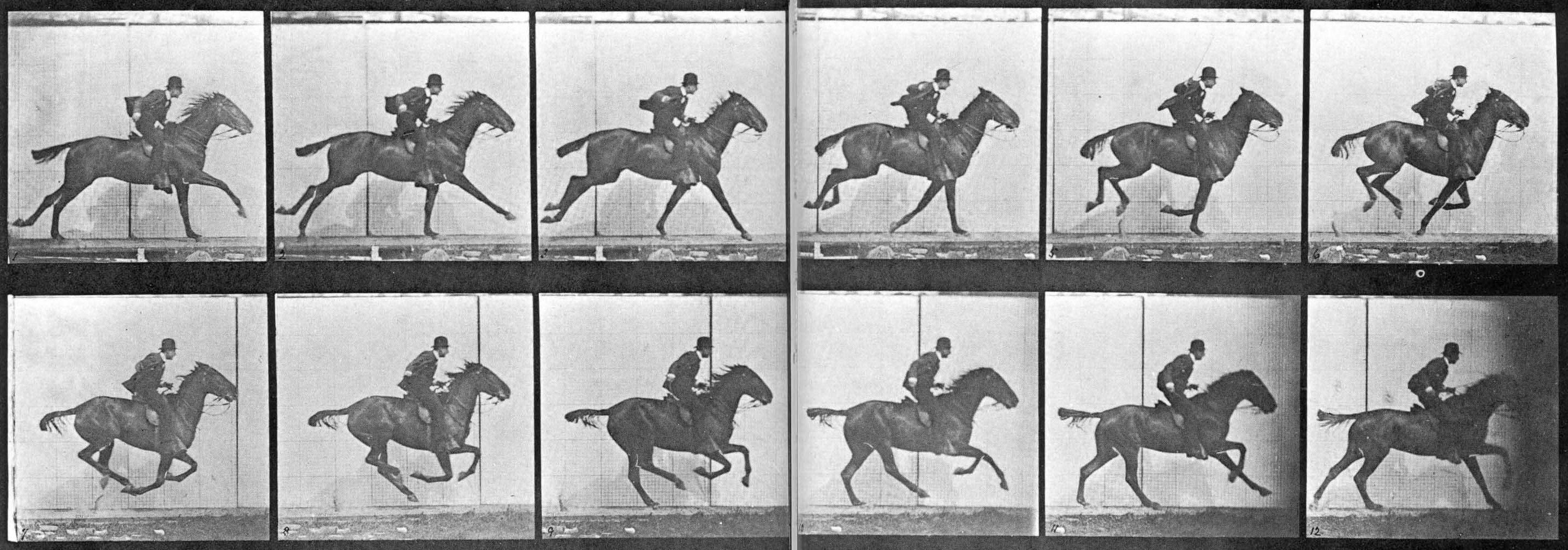
Muybridge's photos of a horse galloping (ca. 1880s), later used in the album cover art for The Photographer

Eadweard Muybridge was an English-born photographer who relocated to the American West and was an early pioneer in photographic technology. He photographed well-known landscapes of Yosemite that pushed the aesthetic and technological boundaries of the medium. His early photographic motion studies conducted in association with Leland Stanford led to the earliest moving photographic images.

In 1874, Muybridge murdered Major Harry Larkyns (referred to as 'Colonel Harry Larkyns' in this work), whom he suspected of being his wife's lover, and was acquitted by a jury against the instructions of the judge on the ground of justifiable homicide. His trial is well-known because his defense argued that a head injury incurred in a stagecoach accident altered his personality, which modern neuroscientists believe could have been caused by certain types of brain damage.

The text included in Glass' work is based on words drawn from the transcripts of the trial People v. Muybridge and Muybridge's actual letters to his wife. The second act features a slideshow of Muybridge's photographs. While based on historical events in Muybridge's life, the work also comments on aspects of Muybridge's work, melding both themes.

== Synopsis ==
The form of this work consists of three acts: a play with incidental music, a concert accompanying a slideshow of Muybridge's work, and a dance with musical accompaniment. In total, the piece lasts about 90 minutes.

=== Act 1 ===
Act 1 is a play that includes three incidental pieces of music that fit into the play. The play recounts Muybridge's murder of Major Harry Larkyns and the trial, with an irreverent tone.

The incidental piece "A Gentleman's Honor", includes words drawn from the actual trial transcript, commentary, and Muybridge's letters. It draws on the incident in which Flora sent Larkyns a portrait of Muybridge's son Florado, seeming to imply that Larkyns could be the father ('Whose baby is this'), and draws on the commentary of spectators ('All that white hair and a long white beard'), as well as referencing Muybridge's carriage accident and his later motion studies ('Horses in the air '). The phrases 'Artificial moonlight' and 'Artificial sky' may refer to techniques used by Muybridge in his landscape technology (overlaying clouds onto his images). Glass notes that he originally conceived the text of A Gentleman's Honor as based on a poem by Muybridge called "Circles", but Glass reconsidered and asked David Byrne to use material from the trial itself, as well as Muybridge's letters.

=== Act 2 ===
Act 2 is a violin solo, or "concert", that either features a figure representing Muybridge in the darkroom in the background or a slideshow of images by Muybridge. Critics have compared the see-saw sounds of the solo violin to a hoe-down or "early American" sound, although Glass claims this analogy was not necessarily intentional.

=== Act 3 ===
In act 3, the characters from act 1 return for a dance (including Muybridge, Flora, Larkyns, and Victorian bystanders). In some productions, the dance features photographs "developed" in the second half.

== Composition and premieres ==
The preview of this work premiered in May 1982 at the Royal Palace in Amsterdam for Queen Beatrix and Prince Claus of the Netherlands and commissioned by the Holland Festival, and its first public performance was in June 1982 as part of the Holland Festival, for which the work was commissioned. The work was suggested and developed by the Dutch director/designer Rob Malasch. Later, Glass rewrote the piece and renamed it The Photographer: Far from the Truth. Though based on Malasch's original premise, this new version of the play was rewritten by Rob Coe. Glass also performed this work as a selection of incidental songs from act 1 and the instrumental work in act 3.

Glass's distinctive minimalist musical style complements the theme of the opera, since the ideas of repetitive sounds and small changes seem to mirror Muybridge's techniques in his famous motion studies. Despite Muybridge's achievements and this relationship to the composer's work, the work does not necessarily treat the subject of Muybridge's trial reverently, and the dance appears to use the subject as an opportunity to comment on the contradictory mores of Muybridge's own time. Glass has stated that he intended to reflect the idea of a "Victorian melodrama" in his music.

This piece seems to show Glass's transitioning from ensemble works like Einstein on the Beach to more traditional instrumentation in his later works. Glass has stated that using the word "minimalist" to apply to this work is "misleading" and would not reflect what the listener would expect to hear.

== Recording ==
The recording was conceived with the idea that most listeners would not have experienced the stage work. Several pieces were shortened or left off the album entirely, and the order of the music is changed. Only two of the original three incidental pieces contained in act 1 are included.

The album was released on June 26, 1984 by CBS Records / Epic and is just 42 minutes long (compared to the 90-minute-long original work).

== Roles ==
- Eadweard Muybridge
- Flora Shallcross Stone Muybridge
- Colonel Harry Larkyns (based on Major Harry Larkyns)
- Observers in Victorian costume

== Instrumentation ==
- Woodwinds: flute, soprano saxophone, alto saxophone, baritone saxophone
- Brass: 2 French horns, 2 trumpets, 2 trombones
- Percussion: Piano, bass synthesizer, electronic organ
- Vocals: Chorus
- Strings: solo violin, Strings
