= Truth claim (photography) =

Truth claim, in photography, is a term Tom Gunning uses to describe the prevalent belief traditional photographs accurately depict reality. He states that the truth claim relies on both the indexicality and visual accuracy of photographs.

== Indexicality ==
Charles Peirce's term 'indexicality' refers to the physical relationship between the object photographed and the resulting image. Paul Levinson emphasises the ability of photography to capture or reflect "a literal energy configuration from the real world" through a chemical process. Light sensitive emulsion on the photographic negative is transformed by light passing through the lens and diaphragm of a camera. Levinson relates this characteristic of the photograph to its objectivity and reliability, echoing Andre Bazin's belief that photography is free from the "sin" of subjectivity.

A similar argument has been made for motion pictures by Stephen Maguire. Lev Manovich labels cinema the art of the index, its traditional identity lying in its ability to capture reality. Denis McQuail likewise argues that film is capable of manipulating the "...seeming reality of the photographic message without loss of credibility."

== Visual accuracy ==
Gunning states that a photograph must also have "iconicity". To represent "truth" it must resemble the object it represents, which is not an inevitable characteristic of an index.

== Consequences of the "truth claim" ==
=== For individuals ===
Levinson suggests that icons have a powerful effect on individuals, particularly the "direct image" due to the "sheer ease and sensual satisfaction" of viewing it.

Gunning attributes the human fascination with photographs to a sense of the relationship between photography and reality, though he claims that the "perceptual richness and nearly infinite detail" of the image itself is more significant than a knowledge of its indexicality. He cites Bazin's idea that photography has an "irrational power to bear away our faith."

Further, Susan Sontag relates the belief in a photograph's ability to capture 'reality' to the development of certain human practices. Since a picture confers on events "a kind of immortality (and importance) it would never otherwise have enjoyed," she explains, the act of taking photographs has become essential to the experience of world travel. The possibility of 'true' photographs leads to a compulsion to "[convert] experience into an image" to "make real what one is experiencing."

=== For society ===
==== Understanding of reality ====
David Croteau and William Hoynes suggest that the prevalence of photographic images has blurred the distinction between image and reality, referring to pseudo-events, in Daniel Boorstin's words – such as press conferences, televised political debates, or 'photo opportunities' - that exist only to create images.

Further, Neil Postman argues that the photograph has redefined society's understanding of information and truth: "Truth is in the seeing, not in the thinking." Postman suggests that the proliferation of photography led to the replacement of language with images as "our dominant means for constructing, understanding, and testing reality".

Sontag shares this view, suggesting that "the 'realistic' view of the world compatible with bureaucracy redefines knowledge as techniques of information.

==== Social organisation ====
In Sontag's view, a consequence of photography becoming a primary means for understanding reality is the emergence of "bureaucratic cataloguing". She claims that photography's perceived ability to give information results in the bureaucratic organization of modern states. Institutions of control, such as the police, are able to survey and control "increasingly mobile populations" through photographic documents, such as passports or identity cards.

==== Desensitization ====
Sontag also argues that through repeatedly capturing and viewing reality through photographs, their subjects can become less real. She claims that "aesthetic distance seems built into the very experience of looking at photographs," and also that the sheer volume of horrific images throughout the world has produced a "familiarity with atrocity, making the horrible seem more ordinary – making it appear familiar, remote … inevitable".

==== Hyperreality ====
Sontag's view is akin to Jean Baudrillard's theory of 'hyperreality', where "reality itself founders" as a result of an endless "reduplication of the real" via media such as photography. He claims that the possibility of infinite identical objects creates a "relationship of equivalence, of indifference,"...leading to the "extinction of the original."

== Digital photography ==
It has been argued that the digitisation of photography undermines its truth claim.

=== Potential for manipulation ===
Levinson suggests that the digitisation of photography undermines "the very reliability of the photograph as mute, unbiased witness of reality" because of the fallibility of technological manipulation and the potential for human refinement of production.

Lev Manovich likewise questions the indexical identity of motion pictures, rather labelling cinema a subgenre of painting, since it is possible to digitally modify frames, generate photorealistic images entirely using 3-D computer animation, and "...to cut, bend, stretch and stitch digitised film images into something which has perfect photographic credibility, although it was never actually filmed."

=== Loss of indexicality ===
It has also been argued that digital photographs inevitably lack indexicality, based on an understanding of "crucial distinctions between the analogue and the digital" in the way they record 'reality'. For instance, Frosh describes photographs as "codes without a message" – "repurposable visual content made of malleable info-pixels."

=== The continuing "reality effect" ===
Gunning alternatively argues that digital photography, the process of encoding data about light in a matrix of numbers, is indexically determined by objects outside the camera like chemical photography.

Likewise, Martin Lister claims that even with a digital camera, "The images produced are rendered photo-realistic, they borrow photography's currency, its deeply historical 'reality effect', simply in order to have meaning."

== Criticism of the "truth claim" ==
Susan Sontag challenges the "presumption of veracity" associated with photographs, arguing that they are "...as much an interpretation of the world as paintings and drawings are." She describes the role of the photographer in determining the exposure, light, texture and geometry of a photograph.

Gunning points to the physicality of the camera as a mediator between the photograph and reality. He notes that the use of a lens, film, a particular exposure, kind of shutter, and developing process "...become magically whisked away if one considers the photograph as a direct imprint of reality."

Sontag also describes the inability of a photograph to capture enough information about its subject to be considered a representation of reality. She states, "The camera's rendering of reality must always hide more than it discloses…only what which narrates can make us understand."

Further, Roland Barthes notes that the human subject can be made less real through the process of being photographed. He notes, "Once I feel myself observed by the lens, everything changes: I constitute myself in the process of 'posing', I instantaneously make another body for myself, transform myself in advance into an image."
