= Gun camera =

Cameras mounted on guns that trigger when fired

United States Army Air Force P-51 Mustang gun-camera displaying engagements against various German Luftwaffe fighter-aircraft over Europe, 1944.

Gun cameras are cameras mounted on a gun, used to photograph or record from its perspective. They are typically used on the weapons of military aircraft and operate either when the gun is fired or at the operator's will. Gun cameras are used for training, analysis, or documentation purposes.

== History ==
Footage of a North American F-86 Sabre shooting down a Mikoyan-Gurevich MiG-15 during the Korean War, 1952

The use of gun cameras first became common for gunnery training in the 1920s, though examples were used during World War I by the British Royal Flying Corps. A special version of the Lewis gun, the Hythe Mark III, was manufactured as a camera gun for the Royal Flying Corps, used by trainees in lieu of actual Lewis guns during mock combat exercises.

During World War II gun cameras were commonly used on operational aircraft to record kills of enemy aircraft. Many photographs and videos from gun cameras, such as those filmed by USAAF flying ace Lieutenant Colonel Jack T. Bradley, survive to this day and are often used as stock footage.

The USAF Combat Photography (1968) de-classified official USAF information film reel.

During World War Two, America's Army Air Forces and Navy aircraft used gun cameras made by Fairchild in Jamaica, NY. Fairchild's first designs were produced in 1932; by 1938 their camera's form was much the same as the models produced during the war. Weighing 3 1/2 pounds, loaded with 50 feet of 16mm film, Fairchild's gun camera was 6x3-1/2x2-1/2 inches in size and built of case-hardened steel. Containing a built-in heating unit, it was capable of operation at temperatures from +165 to -65 degrees Celsius.

Gun cameras technically still exist in modern fighter aircraft and attack helicopters, though they are typically no longer their own separate devices; rather, they are often built into targeting pods, and are able to record footage without the pilot or crew having to fire.

== Applications ==
Gun-camera recorded missile-kill from F-4 Phantom II piloted by Captains Steve Ritchie & Jeff Feinstein during the Vietnam War.

Gun cameras are used by militaries, primarily air forces, for training, analysis, or documentation purposes - they are typically installed in the nose of the plane, on the nose-mounted gun (if one is there), or occasionally on the side or in a wing to provide a clearer view. According to USAF General Robin Olds, a triple ace of World War II, the Lockheed P-38 Lightning's gun camera was mounted directly below the aircraft's Hispano M2 20 mm autocannon, which shook the camera whenever they were fired, making the footage they filmed illegible. In 1944, when Olds was a USAAF fighter pilot, he did not report a battle with two Focke-Wulf Fw 190s, as his gun camera footage was too shaky to confirm the kills; however, a nearby fighter group that witnessed the dogfight confirmed the kills for him.

On older aircraft, tail gunner turrets, or trainer aircraft, gun cameras replace the gun itself, allowing for simulated gunnery practice without actually using a real gun or ammunition.

To track the weapon's fire, the guns the cameras are mounted to often use tracer ammunition; the images or footage produced by the camera also tend to have overlaid reticles.

=== Firearm camera ===
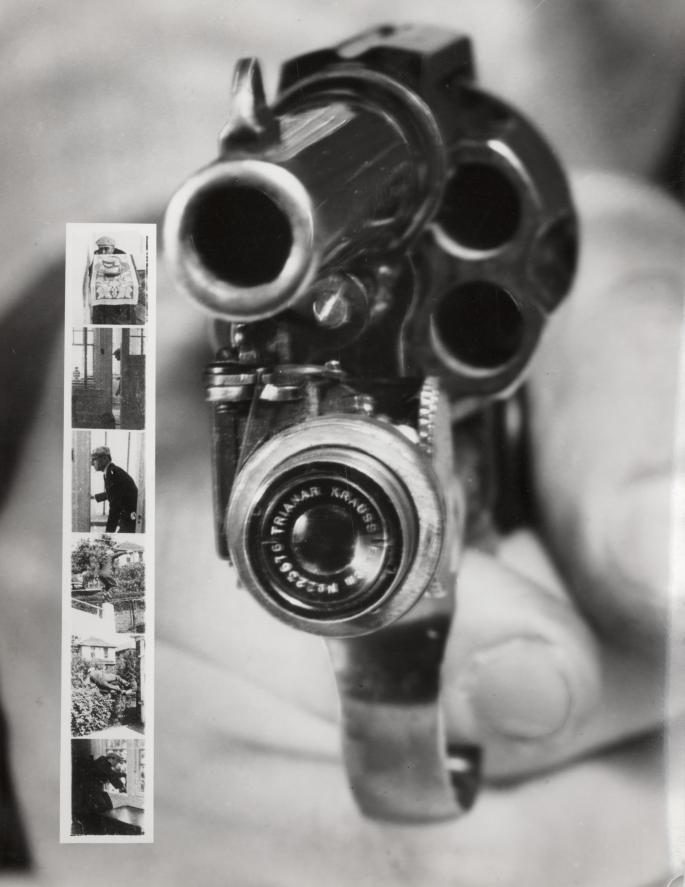
An early underbarrel gun camera on a Colt revolver in 1938

Gun cameras on firearms are used in a manner similar to helmet cameras or body cameras. The cameras are mounted as underbarrel attachments and typically record when activated by the user, or automatically when removed from the weapon's holster.

Firearm cameras are typically used by law enforcement to provide clearer images than body cameras, which can be blocked by the arm or weapon while aiming. According to Viridian Weapon Technologies, a company that manufactures gun cameras, "more than 500 agencies across 47 states" were in the process of testing or adopting firearm cameras as of 2020. Though police said firearm cameras would allow for better police accountability, the American Civil Liberties Union questioned their effectiveness, stating that it would only record police brutality incidents where the officer drew their weapon, and that even in those incidents, the context leading up to the officer's weapon being drawn would not be captured.

Some gun cameras allow the user to see around corners, such as the camera installed in the CornerShot. In this case, they are more similar to holographic weapon sights or tactical fiberscopes than a traditional gun camera.

== Gallery ==
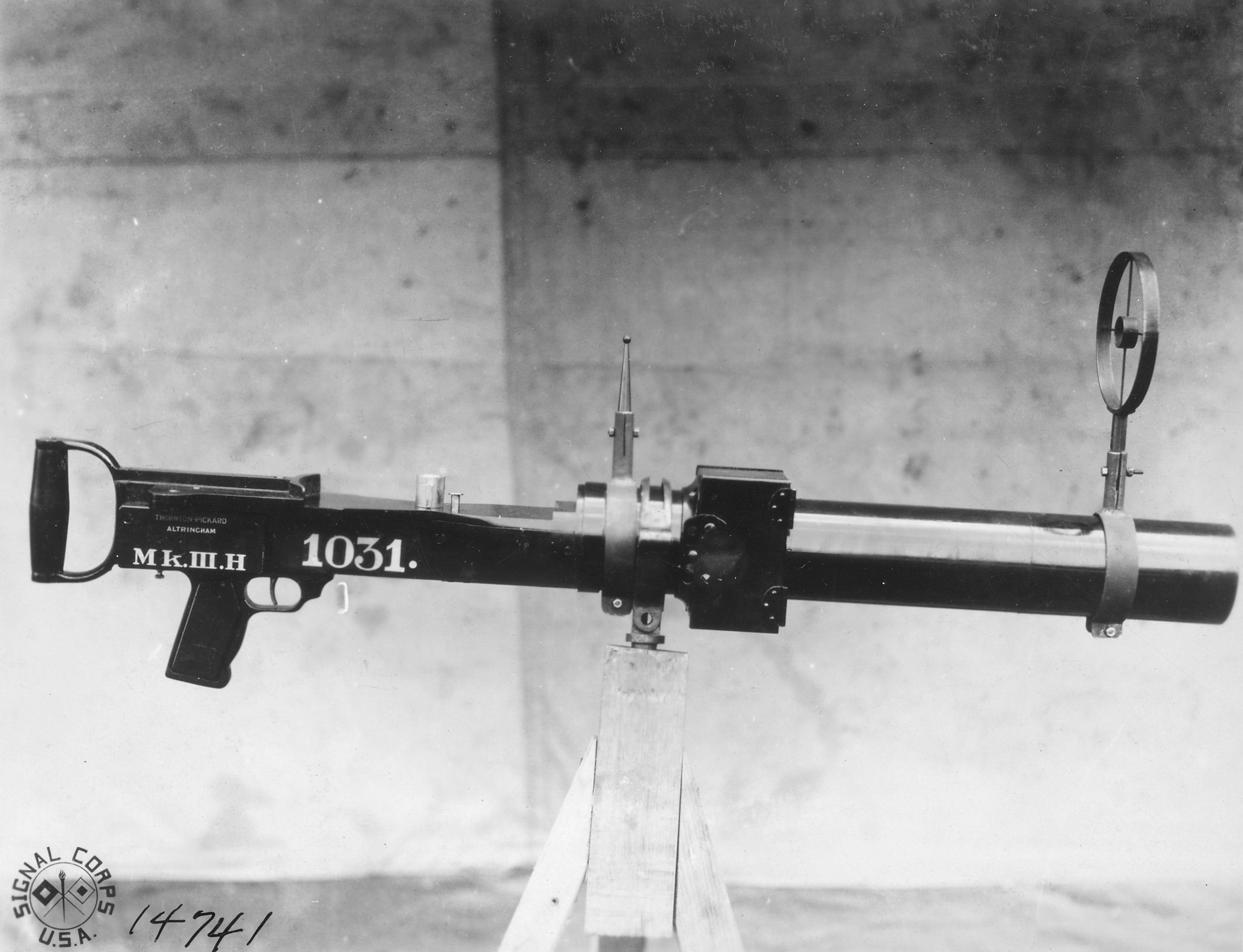
A Hythe gun camera used by the American Expeditionary Forces during World War I

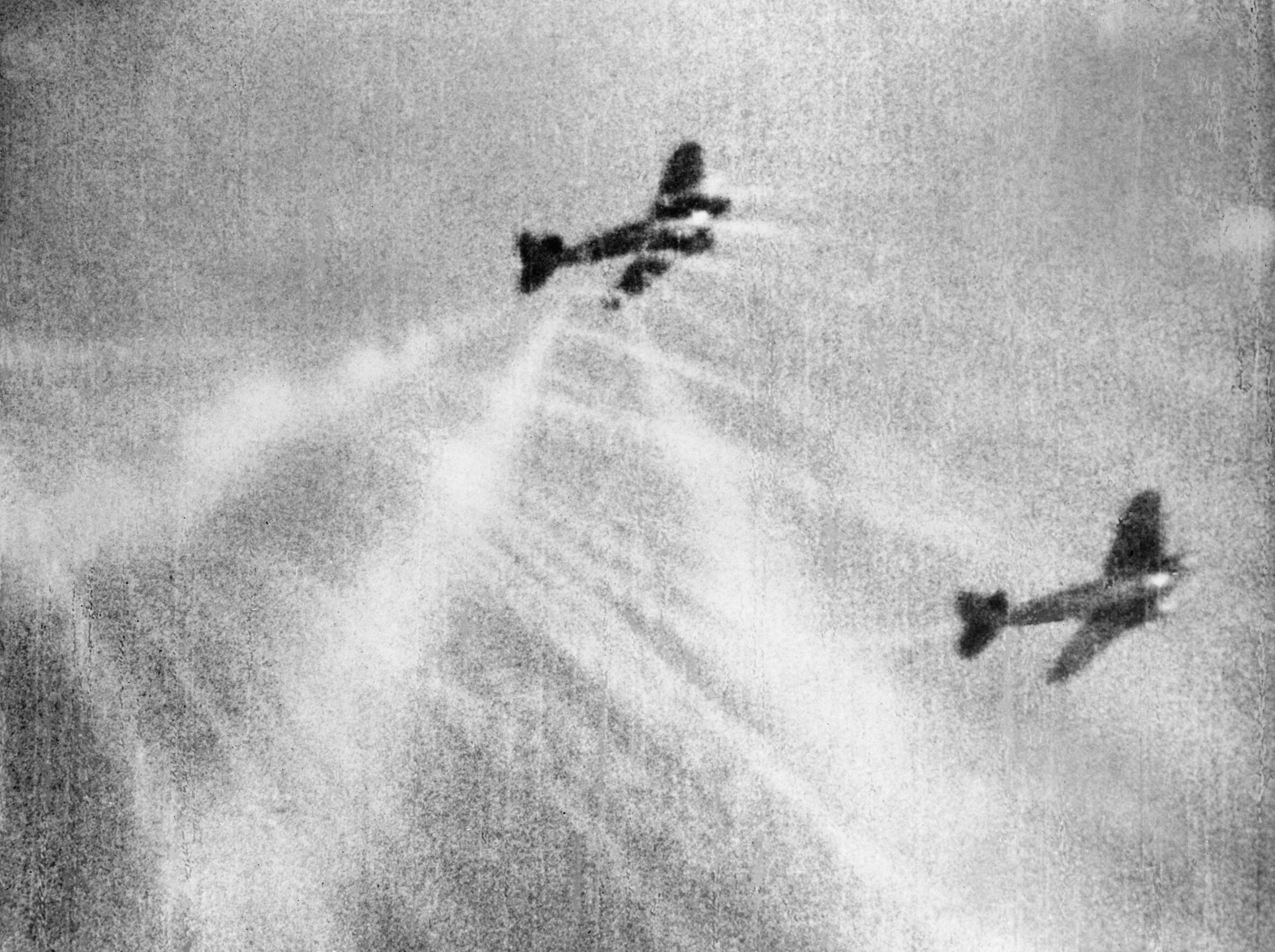
Gun camera photo of tracer ammunition fired from a Royal Air Force Supermarine Spitfire striking a Luftwaffe Heinkel He 111 during the Battle of Britain of World War II

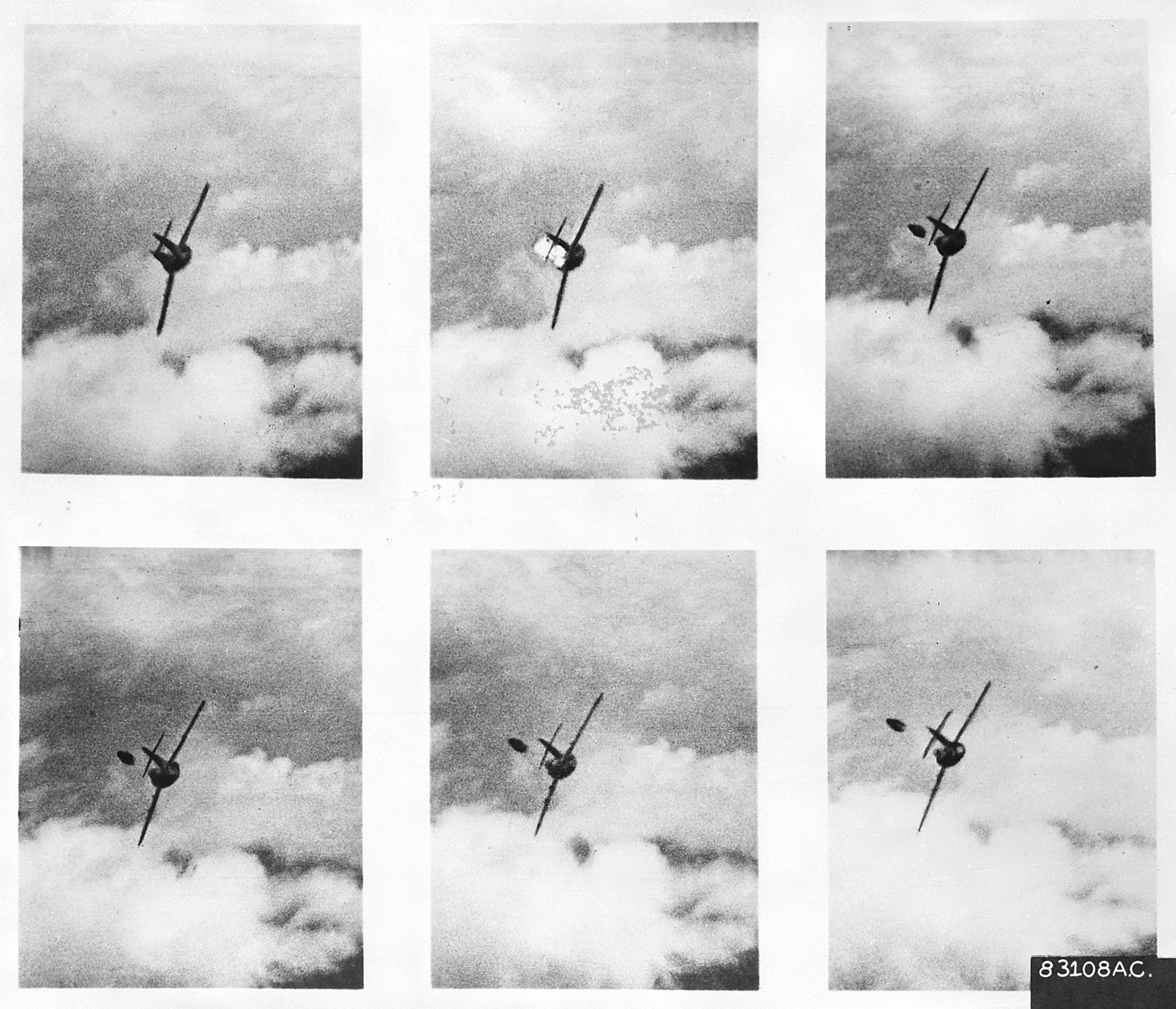
A six-frame gun camera sequence of a pilot ejecting from a stricken MiG-15 during the Korean War

Disintegration footage of STS-107 Space-shuttle Columbia during its atmospheric re-entry in February 2003, recorded via FLIR gun-camera of an AH-64 Apache.

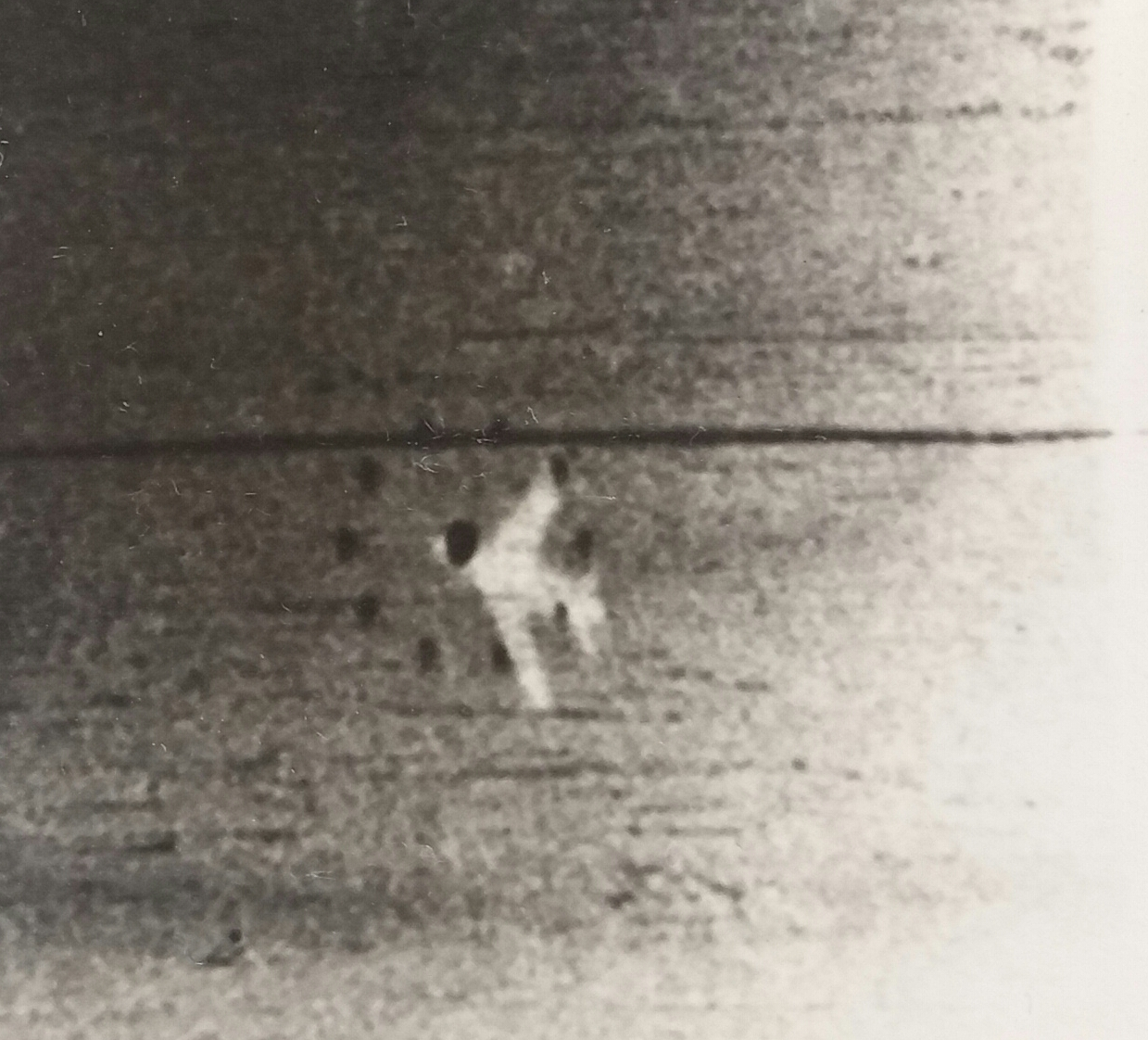
Gun camera photo of an Indian Air Force Folland Gnat shortly before being shot down by a Pakistan Air Force F-86F Sabre during the Indo-Pakistani War of 1971

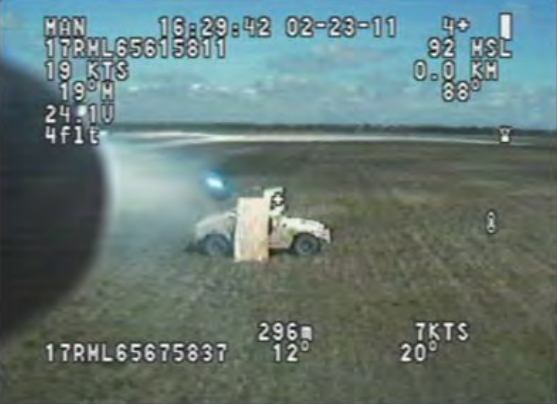
An RQ-11 Raven firing a less-lethal weapon at a man-sized target in front of a Humvee

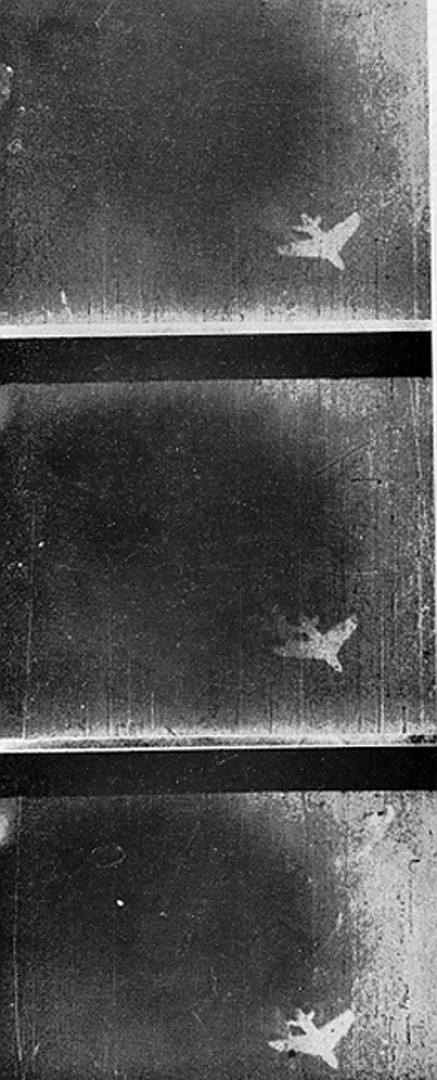
A three frame Gun Camera film from Sharbat Ali Changezi's F-86F Sabre showing an Indian Hawker Hunter being shot down over Lahore District during the 1965 War.

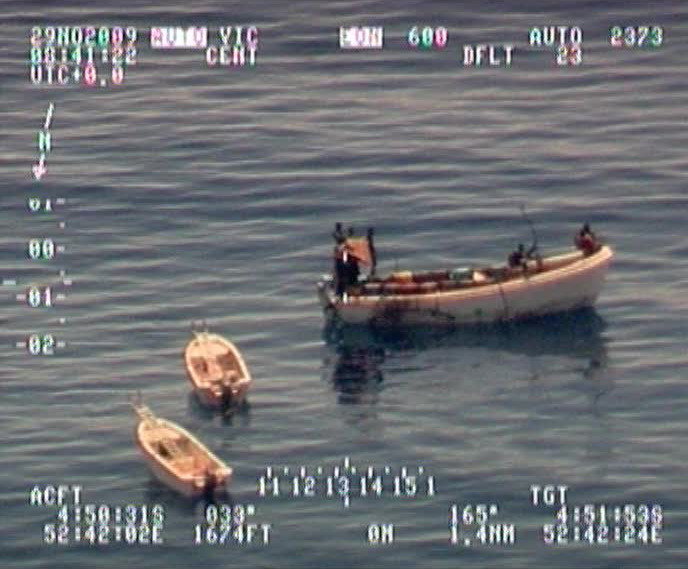
A U.S. military aircraft targeting Somali pirates with its gun camera

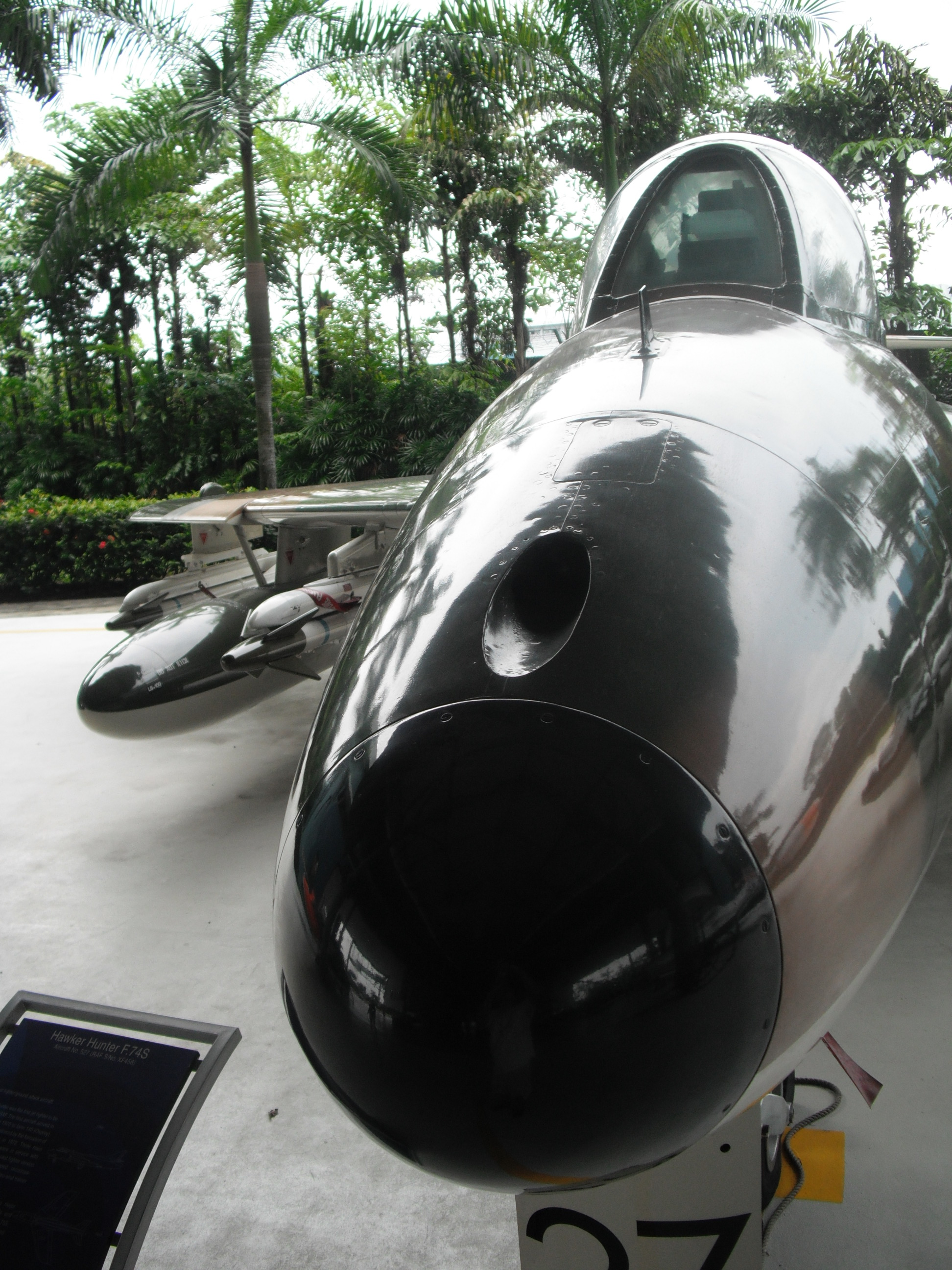
The G-10 gun camera port (circular hole above nose) of a Hawker Hunter

== See also ==
- Index of aviation articles
- Chronophotographic gun
- Laser pistol (sport)
- Robot II
