= Animal Locomotion =

Series of photographs by Eadweard Muybridge

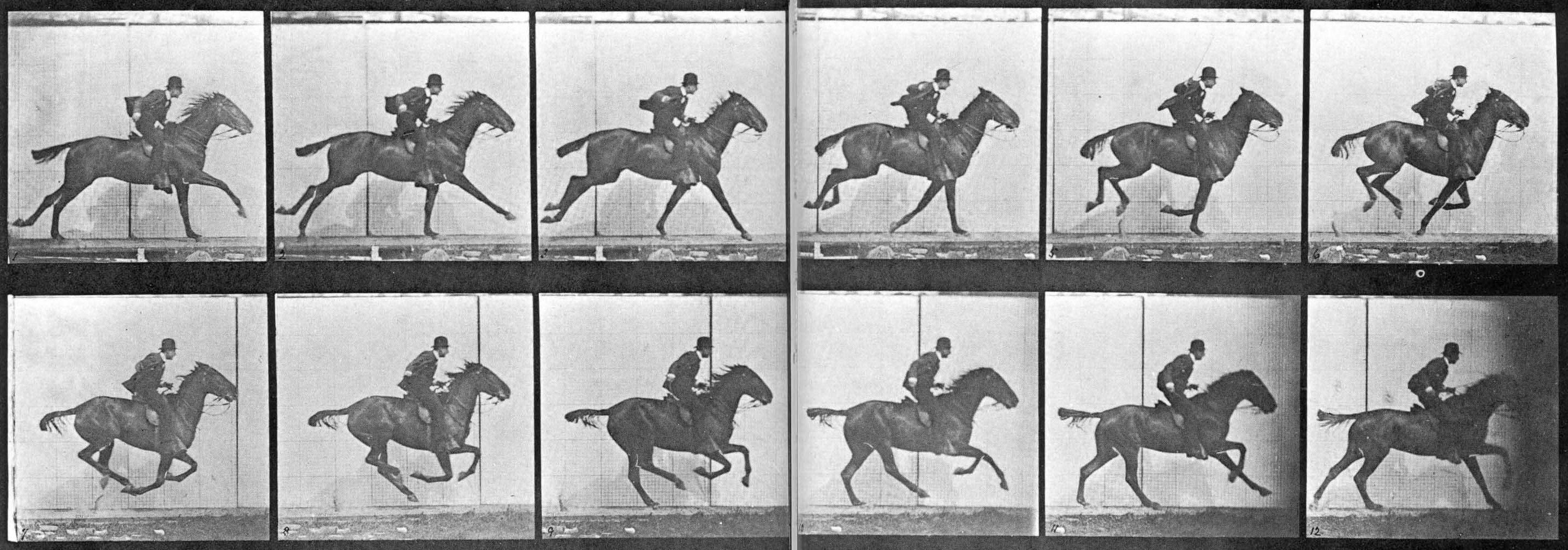
Horse galloping

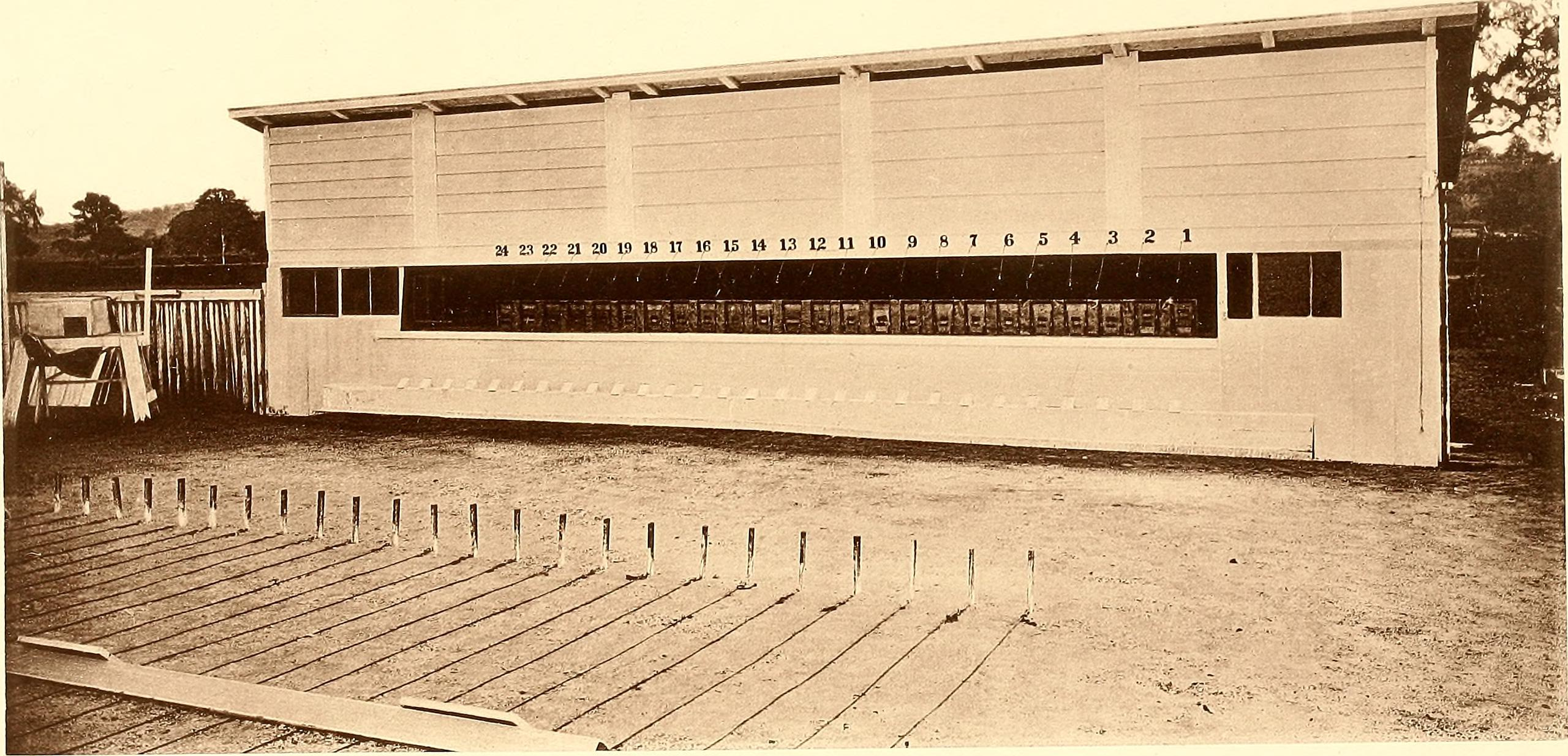
The Horse in Motion, 24-camera rig with tripwires

GIF animation of Plate 626 Gallop; thoroughbred bay mare Annie G.

Animal Locomotion: An Electro-photographic Investigation of Consecutive Phases of Animal Movements is a series of scientific photographs by Eadweard Muybridge made in 1884 and 1885 at the University of Pennsylvania, to study motion in animals (including humans). Published on July 9, 1887, the chronophotographic series comprised 781 collotype plates, each containing up to 36 pictures of the different phases of a specific motion of one subject (over 20,000 images in total).

Following motion studies in California and his lectures with the zoopraxiscope, Muybridge was commissioned by the University of Pennsylvania to oversee the photographic aspects of a scientific study of animal movement. The body of work is celebrated for its contribution to both the art of photography and to science.

== History ==
In 1878, Muybridge published his first series of chronophotographic pictures as 6 cabinet cards entitled The Horse in Motion, from the recordings made as an assignment from industrialist and horse breeder Leland Stanford. The revolutionary images gained worldwide attention and inspired Muybridge to change his career from "photographic view artist" to scientific photographer and lecturer.

In 1879, Muybridge created the zoöpraxiscope (animal action viewer), a projection device that created cyclical animations of animal movement, incorporating technologies from photography, the magic lantern and the zoetrope. The photographer created painted sequences on the glass zoöpraxiscope discs that were based on his motion-study photographs to produce an early form of animation. Muybridge used these to illustrate his lectures that were presented to audiences in the U.S. and Europe, marking his contribution to photography and film in relation to the "experience of time within modernity."

1893 paper Zoopraxiscope disc by Muybridge, Horse Galloping

In a 1885 news report, the photographer stated that his interest in animal movement was inspired by observing an eagle flying in the Yosemite Valley in California some years prior. Muybridge described the bird as making "numerous flaps with its wings, but in flying across a valley to another peak it went for a distance of over a mile with but one flap of the wings. I was convinced that individual feather movements upheld and propelled the bird, and I can prove by the negative plates of the eagle whose flight we photographed last Thursday that my conclusion was correct."

== Commission ==
Eadweard Muybridge, Ostrich Running, animation

The Animal Locomotion project was a collaborative endeavor between the photographer and the institutional commissioning committee at the University of Pennsylvania. In 1883, Muybridge met with William Pepper and J.B. Lippincott to discuss a plan for a scientific study focused on the analysis of animal and human movement. The university contributed $5,000, seeing the proposed project as important research that would benefit anthropology, physiology, medicine and sports. The commission was appointed in March 1884 and included the university's professors Pepper, Joseph Leidy, George Frederick Barker, Lewis M. Haupt and emeritus Harrison Allen, as well as Thomas Eakins and Edward Hornor Coates of the Pennsylvania Academy of the Fine Arts. The project would eventually last more than three years, and costs rose to almost $30,000, but the university believed the unexpected amount of time and money to be well spent. The huge body of work was thought to be of everlasting importance to science and art and it would take years to examine all the material critically.

From spring 1884 to autumn 1885, Muybridge and his team produced over 100,000 images, mostly at an outdoor studio on the university grounds' northeast corner of 36th and Pine, recording the motions of animals from the veterinary hospital, and from humans: University professors, students, athletes, Blockley Almshouse patients, and local residents. Thomas Eakins worked with him briefly, although the painter preferred working with multiple exposures on a single negative, whereas Muybridge preferred capturing motion through the use of multiple cameras.

Muybridge spent three weeks of August and September 1884, and another three weeks of August 1885, at the Philadelphia Zoo photographing all kinds of animals. Published plates with exotic species include Capybara Walking depicting the world's largest rodent, Ostrich Running (also printed as a cyanotype) and American Bison Cantering,

The pictures of thoroughbred horses were made at the Gentlemen's Driving Park in Philadelphia.

== Technology ==
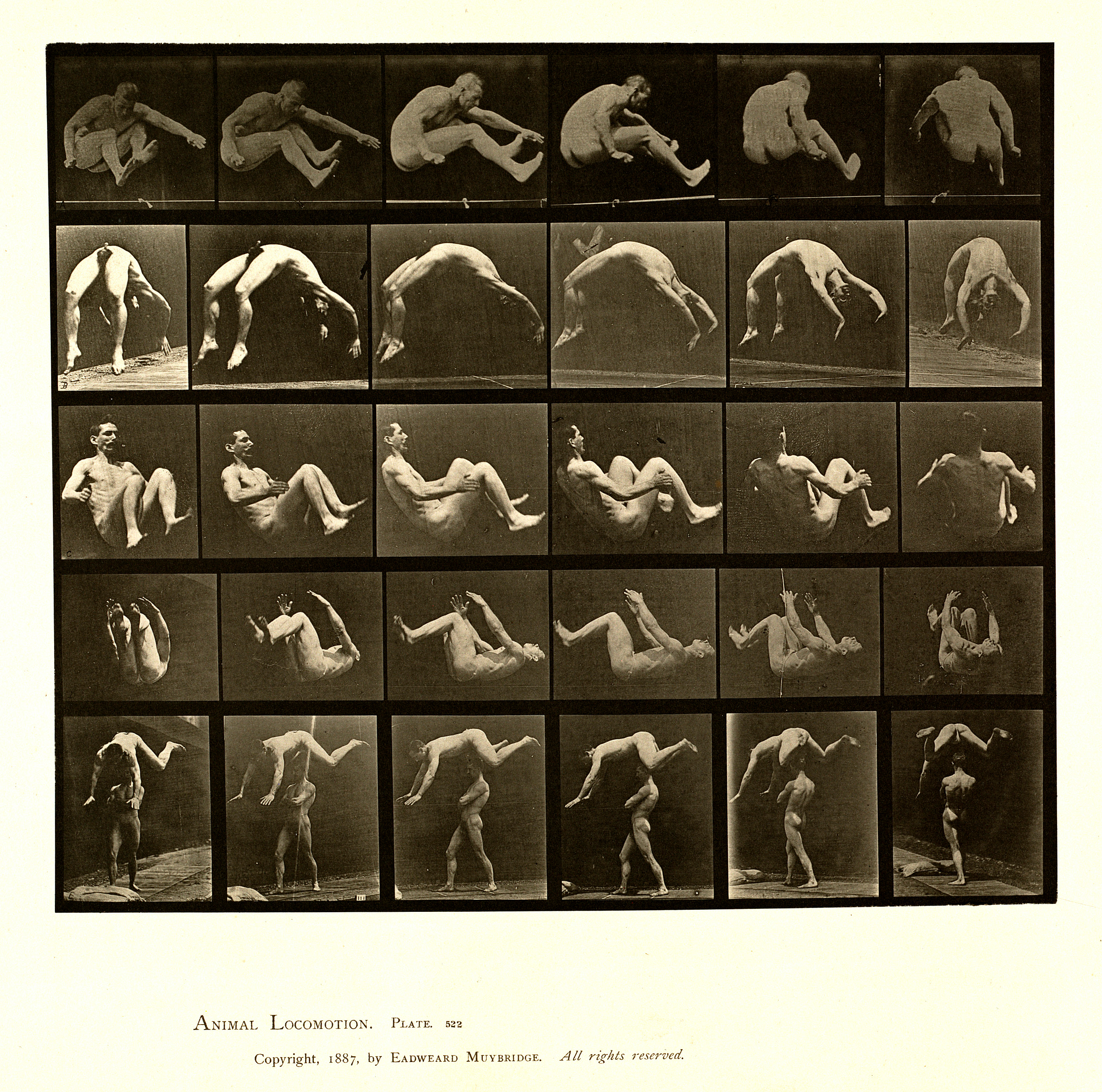
Muybridge Animal locomotion Plate 522. A 97, jumping; B 98, hand-spring; C 98, somersault; D 99, Somersault; E 99, spring over man's back (1887)

At the outdoor studio, Muybridge's team used an array of twenty-four 4 by 5 inch cameras, placed 15 centimeters (6 inches) apart at 15 metres (49 feet) from the track. An improved electro-magnetic shutter system with variable rubber bands regulated the exposures. Muybridge had two additional arrays of smaller, portable cameras made; this allowed more flexible placements and quicker operation. The two arrays of 12 cameras each were usually placed at the front and the back of the track, for views of subjects approaching and receding in addition to the lateral views of the 24-camera set. Many of the published series contain 36 pictures, with moving subjects recorded from two or three angles. Muybridge also made studies of foreshortenings with 6 cameras placed at different angles at the same time (comparable to the later bullet time effect).

The trip-wires caused irregular sequences when subjects didn't maintain a constant gait. Muybridge therefore developed a circuit-breaker for making the successive electrical contacts automatically and at equal intervals, long or short, as desired. Each shutter was connected to a chronographic clock that recorded the exposures. Muybridge carried a telegraphic key with him, which was connected to the clockwork and allowed him to fire the whole series of cameras by a touch.

While working in California, Muybridge had used the wet-plate collodion process in making his albumen-print photographs. Once he arrived in Philadelphia, he began to employ a standardized dry-plate process, involving quicker exposure times; these were printed using the collotype photomechanical process.

== Content and publication ==
Animation of a draped woman opening a parasol and turning around

The published portfolio contained 19 by 24 inch plates in 36 by 36-inch frames, numbered from 1 to 781 in an order mostly based on types of movement (starting with "Walking" followed by "Walking and turning around", "Starting for a run", "Running", et cetera). The plates came in eleven categorized volumes with title pages: Vol. I. & II. Males (nude)., Vol. III. & IV. Females (nude)., Vol. V. Males (pelvis cloth)., Vol. VI. Females (semi-nude and transparent drapery) and Children., Vol. VII. Males and Females (draped) and Miscellaneous Subjects., Vol. VIII. Abnormal Movements. Men and Women (nude and semi-nude)., Vol. IX. Horses., Vol. X. Domestic Animals., and Vol. XI. Wild Animals and Birds. The classification and order of the subjects suggests a hierarchy from nude human males down to chickens, following the Christian concept of the Great chain of being.

Subscribers had the option of selecting 100 plates of their choosing from the portfolio's prospectus and complete catalog for $100. Complete sets were offered for $600, but sold very poorly; reportedly only 37 proper versions were produced.

Contrary to the animal focus suggested by the title of the collection, there were 514 plates of men and women in motion, 27 plates of abnormal male and female movement, 16 of children, 5 of adult male hand movement, and only 221 with animal subjects. Many of the animal plates featured horses, partially a consequence of Muybridge's offering private owners to photograph their horses in exchange for a contribution to the cost of the study. Animals were typically photographed crossing a short distance, human subjects were also portrayed performing activities ranging from typical daily tasks to competitive athletics.

Muybridge classified his adult male human models according to their profession, adult female models ("chosen from all classes of society") to their marital status, age and built. He described himself (model 95) as "an ex-athlete, aged about sixty".

In many cases the human images featured nude or partially-nude men or women, directly confronting a local controversy over the use of nude models in art.

== Reception ==
Muybridge's Animal Locomotion project received attention in the news, who reported on his unusual character and eccentricities as well as the photographic project. The collection's portrayal of nude subjects has been the focus of a directed scholarly study.

Although conceived and initially received as a scientific study, historians note that many of the plates of Animal Locomotion seem to have little to do with science. While most of the male subjects engage in sports or physical labor, most of the movements of female subjects were accessorized with props to create a more imaginative setting, relating to the gendered traditions of 19th century culture. Many of the plates are not the objective records that were suggested by the use of a chronograph and a background grid; Muybridge was more concerned with esthetics and thus cropped the images, freely omitted elements of a sequence, or combined pictures from different takes.

== Legacy ==
Historians and theoreticians have proposed that Muybridge's work on animal locomotion influenced a number of other artists, photographers and filmmakers, including Marcel Duchamp, Thomas Eakins, Walt Disney, among others.

The composer Philip Glass created a three-part chamber opera titled The Photographer in 1982 that featured a slide show of the motion studies in the second act.

The conceptual artist Sol LeWitt was inspired by the serial nature of the Animal Locomotion studies, and produced works that directly refers to it.

Poet and singer Jim Morrison wrote about the project in his bundle The Lords and New Creatures (1970): "Muybridge derived his animal subjects from the Philadelphia Zoological Garden, male performers from the University. The women were professional artists’ models, also actresses and dancers, parading nude before the 48 cameras."

In 1992, the Addison Gallery of American Art produced the exhibition, Motion and Document–Sequence and Time: Eadweard Muybridge and Contemporary American Photography, pairing Muybridge's animal motion studies with the work of 42 artists and photographers among them Vito Acconci and Sarah Charlesworth. The show later traveled to the Long Beach Museum of Art.

An animation of one of the Animal Locomotion horse plates was used for a Google doodle on April 9, 2012, to commemorate the 182nd anniversary of Muybridge's birthday.

An animation of Muybridge's pictures of galloping horse Annie G. (plate 626) was featured in Jordan Peele's 2022 science fiction horror film Nope. In the film, Keke Palmer's character Emerald "Em" Haywood claims that she, her brother OJ Haywood (Daniel Kaluuya) and their father are direct descendants of the rider in the photographs. The animation was also featured briefly in Back to the Future: The Game, made by Telltale.

== Collections ==
The University of Pennsylvania houses the Muybridge Collection, which contains 740 of the 781 plates, along with some of his photographic equipment. Images from the series are held in numerous permanent collections including the Royal Academy of Arts, Pennsylvania Academy of Fine Arts, the Metropolitan Museum, the Brooklyn Museum, the Museum of Modern Art and others.

== Gallery ==
Muybridge, American Buffalo cantering, animated

Animal locomotion, Capybara Walking

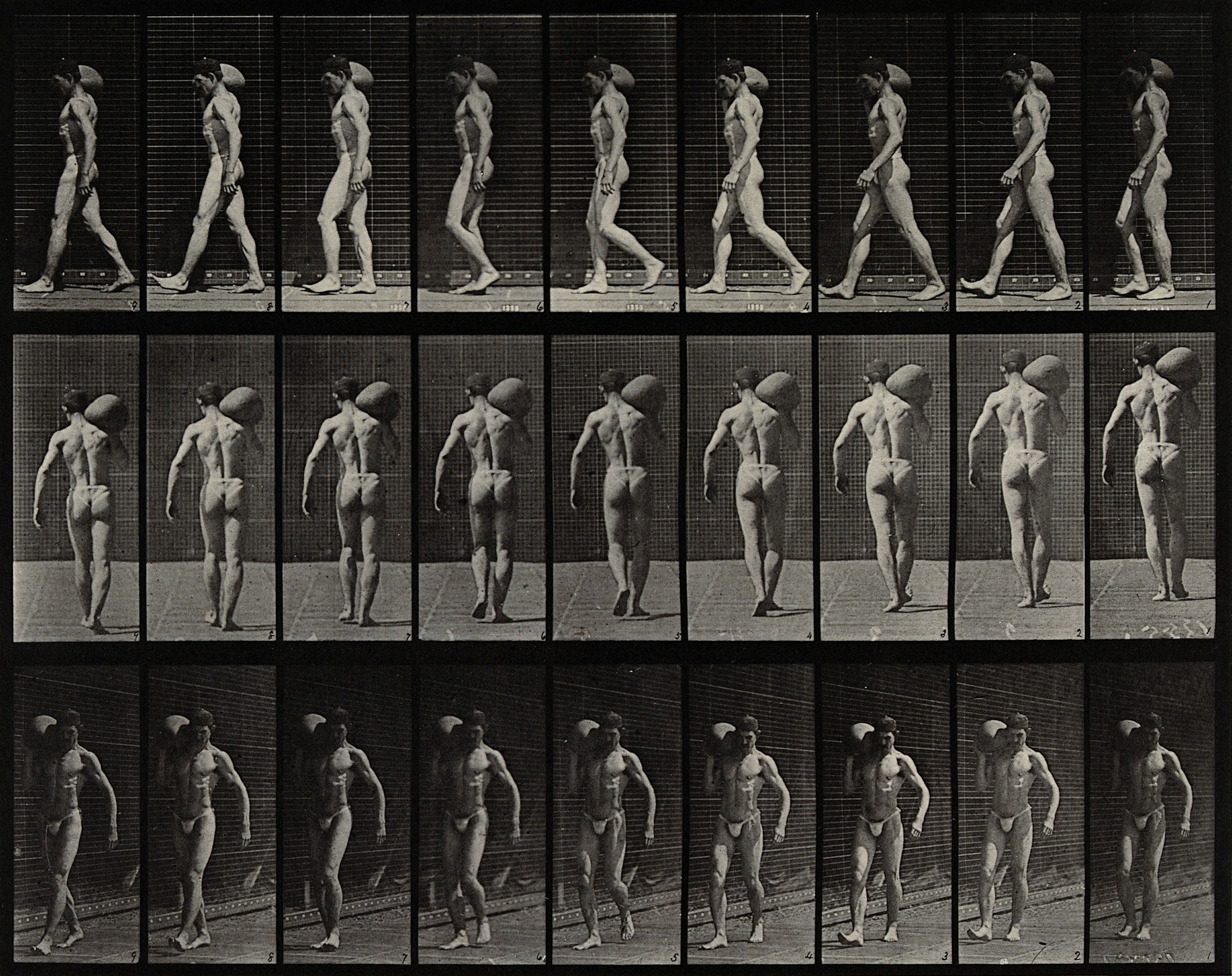
A man walking while bearing load on shoulder.

Woman walking downstairs (1887)

Kicking Mule Muybridge
