= Kartoos =

- Poster
- Directed by: Mahesh Bhatt
- Screenplay by: Robin Bhatt; Akash Khurana
- Dialogues by: Anand Vardhan
- Story by: Robin Bhatt; Akash Khurana
- Based on: La Femme Nikita by Luc Besson
- Produced by: Firoz Nadiadwala
- Starring: Sanjay Dutt; Jackie Shroff; Manisha Koirala
- Cinematography: Bhushan Patel
- Edited by: Waman Bhonsle
- Music by: Nusrat Fateh Ali Khan; Anu Malik; Bally Sagoo
- Production company: Base Industries Group
- Release date: 7 May 1999
- Country: India
- Language: Hindi
- Budget: ₹8.75 crore
- Box office: ₹13.44 crore

Kartoos (lit. 'Cartridge') is a 1999 Indian Hindi action thriller film directed by Mahesh Bhatt and starring Sanjay Dutt, Jackie Shroff and Manisha Koirala. It was the last release of Mahesh Bhatt as a director until the release of Sadak 2 (2020). The film borrows its plot idea from the 1993 film Point of No Return, which in turn is a remake of the French film La Femme Nikita, where Bridget Fonda essays a role which is very similar to that character of Sanjay Dutt. This film was remade in Tamil as "Paramasivan", directed by P. Vasu, in 2006.

== Plot ==
Underworld don Jagat Jogia (Gulshan Grover), is spreading terror in the country and the police are desperate to find him, with his whereabouts unknown. ACP Jai Suryavanshi (Jackie Shroff) decides to create operation "Kartoos" (Cartridge), known only to few people in his team, including agent Sakina, and recruits a criminal on death row, Balraj (Sanjay Dutt) with the alias Raja, by rescuing him secretly when being hanged and giving him a new avatar. Unbeknownst to Raja, Jai plans to kill him after Jogiya is assassinated, as agreed with the commissioner, as this operation is to remain secret and Balraj is supposedly already dead. Raja is sent to the UK as part of his assignment, where he meets Mini and she falls in love (Manisha Koirala) with him. Raja kills each member of the gang one by one at behest of Jai, starting with Jack but soon realises that for Mini's sake he cannot kill anymore. However, he does not renewal his true identity to Mini. Jai is furious and confronts Raja in the UK. He continues to send Raja on assassination sprees under threat of renewing his identity to Mini, even targetting Jogiya's brother. Finally Raja is given the task of assassinating Jogiya which he does, but at the expense of Jai's accomplice Sakina being killed by Jogiya in the process. A dying Sakina tells Balraj he is a good hearted person, revealing Jai's intentions, and that he should run away. Raja reveals the truth to Mini and she yet asserts her desire to be with him. Jai follows the two of them on the run when Raja overpowers Jai and is on the verge of shooting him, when he returns the pistol and says he cannot kill anymore. Jai gives him the option to shoot him else the reverse will occur. Raja tells Jai he is free to kill him immediately. Mini then declares her love for Raja and tells Jai to kill her first. Jai hesitates, when a call from the police chief comes in ordering him to shoot. Jai shoots at Raja's leg and tells the chief that he has been eliminated, operation Kartoos is over.

Jai then removes a GPS chip from Raja's leg and tells him and Mini they are free to go and live their lives, as they bid goodbye.

== Cast ==
- Sanjay Dutt as Raja/Jeet Balraj
- Jackie Shroff as ACP Jay Suryavanshi
- Manisha Koirala as Manpreet "Mini" Kaur
- Gulshan Grover as Jagat Jogia
- Jaspal Bhatti as Mini's Uncle
- Jack Gaud as Jack, Jagat's assistant
- Razak Khan as Cameo Comedian

== Music ==
Given by Nusrat Fateh Ali Khan, Anu Malik and Bally Sagoo and all the songs are penned by Majrooh Sultanpuri.

| No. | Title | Singer(s) | Length |
|---|---|---|---|
| 1. | "Ishq Ka Rutba" | Nusrat Fateh Ali Khan |
| 2. | "O Rabba" | Jayshree Shivram |
| 3. | "Teri Yaad" | Nusrat Fateh Ali Khan, Udit Narayan |
| 4. | "Ghum Hai Ya Khushi Hai Tu" | Alka Yagnik |
| 5. | "Baha Na Aansoo" | Udit Narayan |
| 6. | "Wallah Ye Ladki" | Abhijeet Bhattacharya, Udit Narayan |
