= Chronophotographic gun =

1882 camera invented by Étienne-Jules Marey

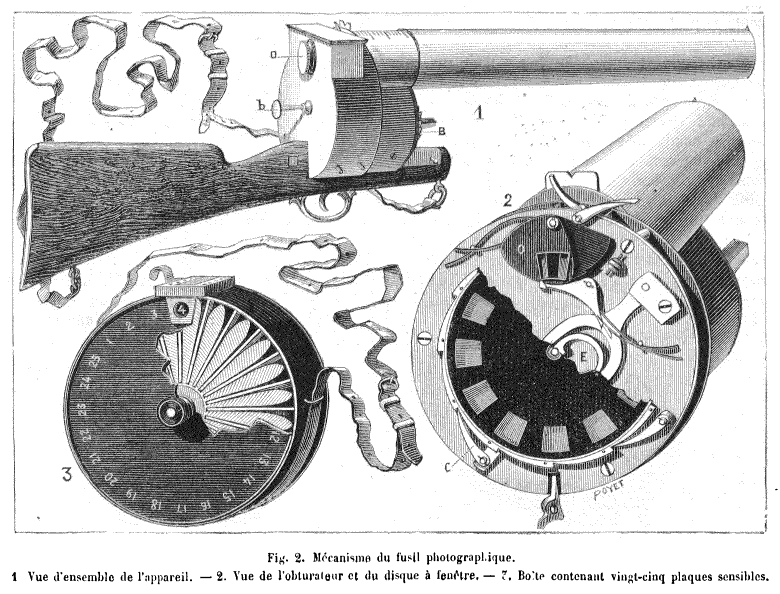
Louis Poyet's engraving of the mechanism of the "fusil photographique" as published in La Nature (April 1882)

The chronophotographic gun is one of the ancestors of the movie camera. It was invented in 1882 by Étienne-Jules Marey, a French scientist and chronophotographer. It could shoot 12 images per second and it was the first invention to capture moving images on the same chronomatographic plate using a metal shutter.

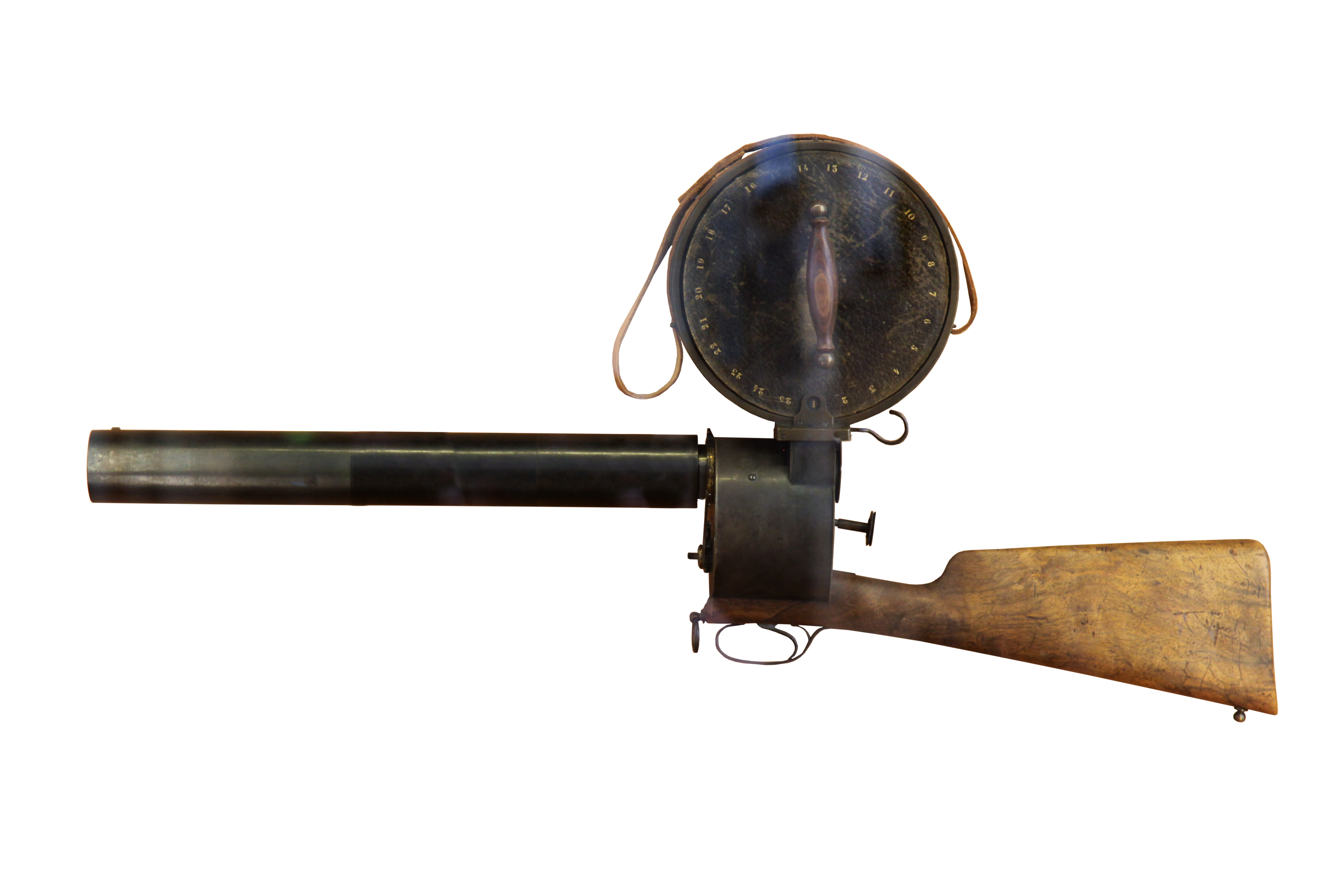
The chronophotographic gun invented by Étienne-Jules Marey.

== History ==
Étienne-Jules Marey developed his chronophotographic gun in 1882, inspired by the photo revolver invented in 1874 by the French astronomer Jules Janssen. Janssen used to record the transit of Venus across the Sun on 9 December 1874. Marey wanted to study how animals, insects and birds moved.

The functioning of the chronophotographic gun is very similar to a normal rifle, with grip, canon and rotating drum, except that it does not carry bullets but photographic plates with which it caught the light at high speed. The hammer was made back to the end, which allowed the drum to move where there were the photographic plates. There was also a shutter on the drum, which prevented the light to enter when it was not taking a photo; and in the canon there was a lens. If one wanted to change the approach, the length of the canon had to be changed.

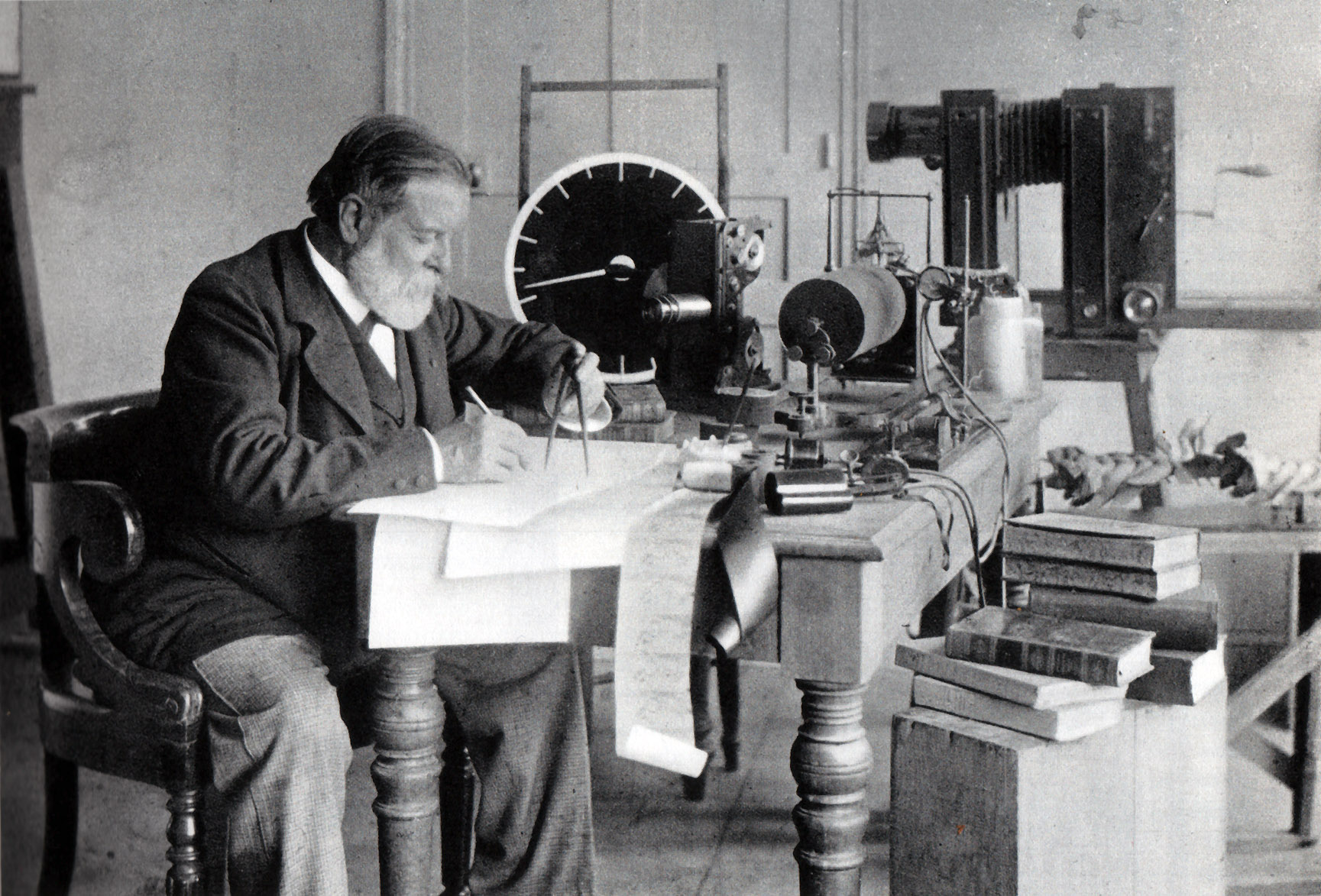
Étienne-Jules Marey

Janssen introduced his revolver to the Société Francaise de Photographie in 1875 and the Académie des Sciences in 1876, to which he suggested the possibility of using his apparatus for the study of the animal movement, especially of the birds, because of the rapidity of the movement of their wings.

Another method to create chronophotographic sequences had been developed by Eadweard Muybridge and Leland Stanford in 1878. They used 12 cameras in a line to register various phases of different horse gaits (expanded to 24 cameras and to other animal and human movements in the next year), with the horses or the wheels of a sulky tripping the wires connected to electro-magnetic shutters. Initial results were published as The Horse in Motion and received much international attention. Marey expressed interest in help from Muybridge to record the flight of birds in La Nature, but reverted to experiments with a photographic gun after Muybridge's pictures of birds didn't satisfy his needs.

Muybridge's method lacked ways to subtract relevant data, because the different photos were not made from the same point of view and the intervals between exposures were irregular, without means to calculate the time in between each registered phase.

Marey was a physiologist interested in animal locomotion. With the chronophotographic gun, he pointed to the action he wanted to investigate and recorded 12 images within a second. The machine, thanks to the circular movement of the drum animated by clockwork mechanisms, could reach a shutter speed of 1/700 seconds. The resulting sequences of images showed details that could not be seen with the naked eye. He called this method of making photographs chronophotography.

== Disuse ==
With time and improvements in his investigations and inventions, Marey ended up changing the chronophotographic gun for a chronophotograph camera. This one had a fixed plate and a shutter with which the time could be controlled. He would later replace the glass plate with a photosensitive paper film that moved independently inside the camera thanks to an electromagnet.

== Legacy ==
The pioneering chronophotography movement comprised an important part of the development of cinematography and further popularised the use of photographic technologies as scientific means to study a wide array of subjects.

Muybridge promoted his work as enabling artists to depict animals in correct positions and heavily criticised artistic works that lacked the scientific knowledge proven by his pictures. The public at large disliked most of the strange positions of the legs of horses that Muybridge had registered, and it took decades before positions based on chronophotographic images were widely accepted in the art world. By then, naturalism had lost much of its attraction to new styles that focused on other means of depicting subjects. Marey's later superimposed sequences nonetheless inspired some works of Futurism, an artistic movement that focused on dynamism, speed and technology. Marcel Duchamp's painting Nude Descending a Staircase, No. 2 is a famous example (rejected by Cubists because it was too Futurist).

The chronophotographic gun was an invention that contributed much to the study of animal locomotion.

The chronophotographic gun is also considered as an antecedent of a machine gun used as military training tool during World War I, called the “Mark III Hythe machine gun camera”. This weapon was used by the British air forces to train their shooters in the air combat. One of the reasons for its use was that the 120mm film was much cheaper than the ammunition needed; but the main reason is that the resulting photographs could allow the evaluators to see how careful and precise the pilot was during the simulation combat.
