= Jacob Davis Babcock Stillman =

American physician

Jacob Davis Babcock Stillman (1819–1888) was personal physician to Leland Stanford, the eighth governor of California.

Stillman wrote the book The Horse in Motion (1881) for Stanford, a study of the different strides of horses, based on the photographs that Eadweard Muybridge had produced for Stanford. Stanford wanted to breed and train fast horses, but didn't trust most of the theories and images of their fast movements. When Muybridge published the chronophotographic picture sequences in 1878 as cabinet cards entitled The Horse in Motion, the actual positions of the legs during the different phases of trot and gallop had surprised a public accustomed to unrealistic paintings of horses in motion. Muybridge sued Stanford because the publication lacked proper credits for his work and the many illustrations based on his pictures.

== Early life ==
Stillman was born 1819 in Schenectady, New York. He was the son of Joseph Stillman II and Elizabeth Maxson, better known as JDB, was the namesake of Jacob D. Babcock of Ashaway, Rhode Island JDB migrated to California in 1849 and made a name not only as a physician but also as an adventurist, writer and a pioneer in the medical field.

He majored in botany and biology at Union College in Schenectady, the third in the United States at the time, graduating in 1843.

== Career ==
Following his graduation from Union, JDB worked as a director in a boarding and later as a surgeon at the Bellevue Hospital Center. During his tenure at the hospital, he set off at age thirty on a 194-day ship journey on the Pacific Ocean for San Francisco via Cape Horn. He narrates the adventure and hardships he faced during the long journey he made along with a bunch of 97 gold hunters--the misery made worse by a ruthless captain of the ship--in his book, “ Seeking the Golden Fleece.” Soon after he landed in San Francisco, he made another trip on a boat across the Sacramento River to the gold mines with his friend Mark Hopkins Jr. but returned after he fell sick. His book An 1850 Voyage, San Francisco to Baltimore, By Sea and Land, recounts another voyage.

== Personal life ==
Stillman was married twice. His first wife was Caroline Maxson (1822–1852), whom he married in 1843. Before her death in New York on May 26, 1852, they were the parents of:

- John Maxson Stillman (1852–1923), a professor of history and chemistry, he married Emma Rodolph.

After the death of his first wife, JDB remarried Mary Gavitt Wells (1833–1923), a daughter of William Davis Wells and Abby Gavitt Wells of Westerly, Rhode Island in 1854, and continued his medical practice in New York. Together, they were the parents of:

- Dr. Stanley Stillman (1861–1934), a surgeon who married Josephine Welsh.
- Amy Stillman (1863–1957), who married Edward Howell Mulligan.
- Mabel Stillman (1867–1941), who married Frank Pierce Morrison.
- Leland Stanford Stillman (1870–1933), a banker who married Ada Lombard Latimer in 1902.

After retiring from his profession, JDB moved to Redlands, California, where he bought 200 acre land and started a vineyard. JDB died in Redlands at the age of 69.

=== Descendants ===
Through his son Leland, he was a grandfather of Louise Stillman, who married Lewis E. Lehrman.
