= Bally Sagoo =

British-Indian record producer

- Bally Sagoo (left) with Angela Ang (2003)
- Born: Baljit Singh Sagoo; 19 May 1964 (age 62); Delhi, India
- Occupations: Record producer; DJ
- Years active: 1989–present
- Labels: Oriental Star; Sony Music; Ishq Records; Fresh Dope Records
- Children: 3
- Website: www.ballysagoomusic.com

Baljit Singh "Bally" Sagoo (Punjabi: ਬਲਜੀਤ ਸਿੰਘ ਸੱਗੂ,) is a British-Indian record producer and DJ. Born in Delhi, India, Sagoo was raised in Birmingham, England. He entered the recording and entertainment industries in 1989. He is the figurehead of the UK/Belgium-based entertainment company, Fresh Dope Industries.

== Career ==
In 1989, Oriental Star Agencies, a UK based record label, asked him to remix a Punjabi track called "Hey Jamalo". The single became a hit and Sagoo joined OSA as their full-time in-house producer. Through this relationship, he released his first album, Wham Bam which spawned a sequel, Wham Bam 2. Other material during this period included Star Crazy and Sagoo's 1991 collaboration with Nusrat Fateh Ali Khan on Magic Touch. Over 50,000 copies of Star Crazy were sold in UK and overseas market.

=== 1990s ===
In 1994, Sagoo signed with Sony Records to produce Bollywood Flashback. He became the first Indian artist to reach national mainstream radio when the album track "Chura Liya" (a re-working of Asha Bhosle's song) was played on BBC Radio 1. This was followed in 1996 by his first, all-original work Rising from the East, which included "Dil Cheez" and "Tum Bin Jiya". Subsequently, he featured on the album Dance Attack and composed another remix music video, Mera Laung Gawacha. Starring Deepti Bhatnagar and Jas Arora, the video was directed by Polygram Multimedia, and became a hit in the UK. Sagoo made it onto Top of the Pops. He toured India with Michael Jackson on the HIStory World Tour, produced the Aby Baby album with Amitabh Bachchan and was invited to New Delhi to meet then Indian president, Shankar Dayal Sharma.

=== 2000s ===
In 1999, Sagoo launched his own UK music label, Ishq Records. Its first output was his album, Dub of Asia. Ishq followed this with the release of other Sagoo titles including Anything But Silent, Hanji and the technical Sag Loops series. The label also managed and showcased other new talents and delivered tracks such as "Noorie" on Sagoo's 2000 release, Bollywood Flashback 2.

In 2003 at the UK Asian Awards, the Spice Girls presented him with the inaugural trophy for Outstanding Achievement.

That decade, Sagoo's music supported Gurinder Chadha's Bend It Like Beckham, Mira Nair's Monsoon Wedding (2001), the Aishwarya Rai and Dylan McDermott drama The Mistress of Spices and It's a Wonderful Afterlife. Sagoo also starred in and composed the music for the 2006 Punjabi film, Sajna ve Sajna. He appeared in television programmes during the 2010s, including the UK Lottery show, the Asian reality show Bollywood Star and celebrity magazine formats such as Tinseltown TV.

=== 2010s ===
In 2012, Sagoo opened a studio in Mumbai, and splits his time between the UK and India. He merged the business assets of Ishq Records into Fresh Dope Records, the music division of Fresh Dope Industries. It has a head office in Brussels and an operational satellite in Mumbai. It is engaged in feature film production, television, artist promotion and management, corporate participation, online and traditional publishing, live performances, lifestyle products, fashion trends and technology developments.

== Personal life ==
The Sopanam musician and composer Saminder Sagoo is his father. Musafirs in U.K his team. The Empyrean Heven empyrean him in 2015.

== Discography ==
=== Films ===
Year	Film	Language
1999	Kartoos	Hindi
2000	Hera Pheri	Hindi
2001	Monsoon Wedding	Hindi
2001	Phir Bhi Dil Hai Hindustani	Hindi
2002	Bend It Like Beckham	English
2005	The Mistress of Spices	Hindi
2006	Sajna Ve Sajna	Hindi
2007	Cape Karma	Hindi
2010	It's a Wonderful Afterlife	English
2024	The Buckingham Murders	Hindi

=== Albums ===
Year	Title	Distribution
1990	Wham Bam	Oriental Star Agencies
1991	Star Crazy	Oriental Star Agencies
1991	Essential Ragga	Oriental Star Agencies
1992	Magic Touch feat. Nusrat Fateh Ali Khan	Oriental Star Agencies
1993	Wham Bam 2	Oriental Star Agencies
1994	Bollywood Flashback	Sony/Columbia Records
1995	On the Mix (compilation)	Oriental Star Agencies
1996	Rising from the East	Sony/Columbia Records
1996	Aby Baby feat. Amitabh Bachchan	Big B Records
1998	Star Crazy 2 (Aaja Nachle)	Oriental Star Agencies/ Sony Music India
1999	Sagloops 1 to 4	Ishq Records
1999	Dub of Asia	Ishq Records
2000	Bollywood Flashback 2	Ishq Records
2001	Anything But Silent feat. Jared Bashir & Gunjan	Ishq Records
2001	Gunjan feat Gunjan	Ishq Records
2002	Kuch Kuch Hota Hai - The Remixes	1998 Movie soundtrack remix
2002	Aap Ki Nazaron Ne Samjha feat. Gunjan	Ishq Records
2003	Hanji	Ishq Records
2004	Botllan Sharab Diyan	Nupur Audio
2004	Bollywood Buzz	Nupur Audio
2014	Future Shock	Fresh Dope Records
2015	Cafe Punjab	Fresh Dope Records
2021	Next Level	Fresh Dope Records

2026 Letsagoo

=== Singles ===
Year	Title	Distribution
1989	"Hey Jamalo"	Oriental Star Agencies
1991	"Ragga Muffin Mix"	Oriental Star Agencies
1991	"Jewel" feat. Nusrat Fateh Ali Khan	Oriental Star Agencies
1994	"Chura Liya"	Sony/Columbia Records
1995	"Choli Ke Peeche"	Sony/Columbia Records
1996	"Dil Cheez" feat. Shabnam Majeed	Sony/Columbia Records
1996	"Tum Bin Jiya" feat. Shabnam Majeed	Sony/Columbia Records
2000	"Noorie" feat. Gunjan	Ishq Records
2006	"Pesa nasha pyar.Bohemia"	Ishq Records
2013	"Thori Ji Kori" feat. Harry Mirza	Fresh Dope Records
2021	"Kinna Chauna" feat. Vicky Marley	Fresh Dope Records

== See also ==
- List of British Sikhs
