= Rising from the East =

1996 album by Indian DJ Bally Sagoo

Rising From The East is an album by a UK-based Indian DJ Bally Sagoo in 1996.

The album was rated 2.5 out of 5 stars by AllMusic.

== Track listing ==
#	Title	Duration
1	Tum Bin Jiya	7:05
2	Ban Mein Aati Thi	6:17
3	Nach Malanga	7:26
4	Dil Cheez	6:50
5	Tere Nain	6:01
6	Jitna Humne	6:37
7	Aaja Ve Maahi	7:08
8	Teri Akhiyan	5:58
9	Laila	7:07
10	Milna Julna	6:39
11	Dil Cheez (Remix)	5:42
