= 1879 in animation =

- Years in animation: 1876 1877 1878 1879 1880 1881 1882
- Centuries: 18th century · 19th century · 20th century
- Decades: 1840s 1850s 1860s 1870s 1880s 1890s 1900s
- Years: 1876 1877 1878 1879 1880 1881 1882

Events in 1879 in animation.

== Events ==
- Specific date unknown:
  - In 1879, Charles-Émile Reynaud registered a modification to the praxinoscope patent to include the Praxinoscope Théâtre, which utilized the Pepper's ghost effect to present the animated figures in an exchangeable background. Later improvements included the "Praxinoscope à projection" (marketed since 1882) which used a double magic lantern to project the animated figures over a still projection of a background.
  - In 1879, Eadweard Muybridge created the zoöpraxiscope (animal action viewer), a projection device that created cyclical animations of animal movement, incorporating technologies from photography, the magic lantern and the zoetrope. The photographer created painted sequences on the glass zoöpraxiscope discs that were based on his motion-study photographs to produce an early form of animation. Muybridge used these to illustrate his lectures that were presented to audiences in the United States and Europe, marking his contribution to photography and film in relation to the "experience of time within modernity."
  - An 1879 edition of the Sallie Gardner cabinet card has the images altered to create more distinct outlines (with straight lines and clear numbers replacing the original photographic background) "with care to preserve their original positions". The verso has a diagram of the mare's foot movements in a complete stride, executed per Leland Stanford's instructions.
  - Eadweard Muybridge continued the studies at Palo Alto, California with 24 cameras in 1879, producing further chronophotographic pictures of more horses, some other animals, male athletes, and a sequence depicting a horse skeleton jumping a hurdle (utilizing a technique that resembles stop motion).

== Births ==
=== June ===
- June 22: Guido Seeber, German film director, cinematographer and animator (Prosit Neujahr 1910!), (d. 1940).

=== July ===
- July 10: Amedee J. Van Beuren, American film producer, (Van Beuren Studios), (d. 1938).
- July 31: Léopold Survage, Russian-French avant-garde painter, pioneer of abstract animation (Rythmes colorés), (d. 1968).

=== August ===
- August 25: J. R. Bray, American animator, cartoonist, and film producer (Colonel Heeza Liar), (d. 1978).

=== October ===
- October 2: Angel Espoy, Spanish-American painter (worked in the animation industry of San Francisco, staff member of the Animated Film Corporation), (d. 1963).
