= 1881 in animation =

- Years in animation: 1878 1879 1880 1881 1882 1883 1884
- Centuries: 18th century · 19th century · 20th century
- Decades: 1850s 1860s 1870s 1880s 1890s 1900s 1910s
- Years: 1878 1879 1880 1881 1882 1883 1884

Events in 1881 in animation.

== Events ==
- Specific date unknown:
  - In 1881, Eadweard Muybridge first visited Étienne-Jules Marey's studio in France and viewed stop-motion studies before returning to the United States to further his own work in the same area. The Chronophotography of Muybridge and Marey was a predecessor to cinematography and the moving film. It also had a profound influence on the beginnings of Cubism and Futurism. Chronophotography involved a series or succession of different images, originally created and used for the scientific study of movement.
  - In 1881, Ottomar Anschütz created his first instantaneous photographs. By 1882, he had developed a portable camera that allowed shutter speeds as short as 1/1000 of a second. The quality of his pictures was generally regarded to be much higher than that of the chronophotography works of Eadweard Muybridge and Étienne-Jules Marey. By 1886, Anschütz had developed the Electrotachyscope, an early device that displayed short motion picture loops with 24 glass plate photographs on a 1.5 meter wide rotating wheel that was hand-cranked to the speed of circa 30 frames per second. Different versions were shown at many international exhibitions, fairs, conventions and arcades from 1887 until at least 1894.
  - In 1881, Eadweard Muybridge collected his chronophotographic pictures in the portfolio The Attitudes of Animals in Motion, showcasing a technique that resembles stop motion. Muybridge kept the edition very limited because of his plans for related book projects with Leland Stanford and Étienne-Jules Marey.

== Births ==
=== August ===
- August 28: Joseph Rosenberg, Hungarian-American bank executive (approved loans to the Walt Disney Animation Studios and influenced the animation studio's decision making, approved loans for the production of Snow White and the Seven Dwarfs, issued a 1941 ultimatum which restricted the Disney studio to only produce new animation shorts and to finish the animated features which were already in production, with no other new productions allowed), (d. 1971).

=== October ===
- October 20: Norman Whitten, English silent film producer, director, and actor (founder of the General Film Supply company (GFS), credited for creating Ireland's first animated film), (d. 1969).

=== December ===
- December 8: Padraic Colum, Irish poet, novelist, dramatist, biographer, playwright, children's author and collector of folklore (screenwriter for the stop-motion animated film Hansel and Gretel: An Opera Fantasy), (d. 1972).

== Sources ==
- Barrier, Michael (1999). Hollywood Cartoons: American Animation in Its Golden Age. Oxford University Press. ISBN 978-0-19-802079-0.
- Gabler, Neal (2006). Walt Disney: The Triumph of the American Imagination. Vintage Books. ISBN 978-0-679-75747-4.
