= 1876 in animation =

Events in 1876 in animation.

== Events ==
- November 9: The English inventor Wordsworth Donisthorpe files a patent for a film camera, which he named a "kinesigraph." The camera would have a mechanism to move photographic plates one by one past a lens and shutter to be exposed for the necessary time and then dropped or carried into a receiver. The recorded images would be printed at equal distances apart on a strip of paper. The strip was to be wound between cylinders and carried past the eye of the observer, with a stroboscopic device to expose each picture momentarily. Such photographic strips only became commercially available several years later and Donisthorpe seems to have been unable to produce motion pictures at this stage. Donisthorpe reportedly produced a model of this camera around the late 1870s. In 1889, Donisthorpe completed his work on an improved version of the camera and the projector necessary to show the motion frames.In 1890, Donisthorpe and his cousin W. C. Crofts created a moving picture of London's Trafalgar Square.
- Specific date unknown:
  - The popular science magazine La Nature publishes a series of articles about optical illusion devices. The articles inspire the magic lantern performer Charles-Émile Reynaud to start developing his own animation device, the praxinoscope. He received a patent for his device in 1877.
  - The French astronomer Pierre Janssen introduces the chronophotography instrument Janssen revolver to the Académie des Sciences. He suggested to the Académie the possibility of using his apparatus for the study of animal locomotion, especially of the birds, because of the rapidity of the movement of their wings. Etienne-Jules Marey would later use Janssen's invention as the primary inspiration for his chronophotographic gun (1882), a precursor to the camcorder.The functioning of the chronophotographic gun is very similar to a normal rifle, with grip, canon and rotating drum, except that it does not carry bullets but photographic plates with which it caught the light at high speed.
  - In 1876, Hurter and Driffield began pioneering work on the light sensitivity of photographic emulsions in 1876. Their work enabled the first quantitative measure of film speed to be devised.

== Births ==
=== June ===
- June 22: Raymond Ditmars, American herpetologist and documentary filmmaker on the topic of natural history (pioneer in the use of stop-motion animation, timelapse, macro photography, and sound film in documentary films), (d. 1942).

=== July ===
- July 18: Anson Dyer, English director, screenwriter, animator, and actor (directed Adolf Hitler-themed animated short films for Gaumont-British, including The British Lion Awakes, Hitler On His Front Line, Hitler's Peace Pudding, Hitler Dances To Stalin's Tune, and Run, Adolf, Run), (d. 1962).
- July 20: Kitazawa Rakuten, Japanese manga artist and nihonga-style painter considered the first professional cartoonist in Japan and the founding father of modern manga, (trained many young manga artists and animators, including Hekoten Shimokawa, the creator of Japan's first cartoon animation, (d. 1955).

== Deaths ==
=== May ===
- May 7: Count Franz Graf von Pocci, German courtier, children's writer, illustrator, and puppeteer founding director of the Munich Marionette Theatre, (reportedly performed shadow plays, one of the precursors of silhouette animation), dies at age 69.
- Specific date unknown: Thomas Mann Baynes, English artist and lithographer (his works include phenakistiscope discs, for use by the first widespread animation device which created a fluent illusion of motion.)

== Sources ==
- Bendazzi, Giannalberto (1994). Cartoons: One hundred years of cinema animation. Indiana University Press. ISBN 0253209374.
- Myrent, Glenn (1989). "Emile Reynaud: First Motion Picture Cartoonist". Film History. 3 (3). Indiana University Press: 191–202. doi:10.2307/3814977. JSTOR 3814977.
