= 1877 in animation =

Events in 1877 in animation.

== Events ==
- August 11: On August 11, 1877, the Daily Alta newspaper announced a project by Eadward Muybridge and Leland Stanford to produce sequences of photographs of a running horse with 12 stereoscopic cameras. Muybridge had much experience with stereo photography and had already made instantaneous pictures of Stanford's horse Occident running at full speed. He eventually managed to shoot the proposed sequences of running horses in June 1878, with stereoscopic cameras. The published result and animated versions for his zoopraxiscope were not stereoscopic, but in 1898 Muybridge claimed that he had (privately) viewed the pictures in two synchronized zoetropes with Wheatstone's reflecting stereoscope as a "very satisfactory reproduction of an apparently solid miniature horse trotting, and of another galloping".
- August 30: Charles-Émile Reynaud patented the praxinoscope, an animation device that improved on the zoetrope. Like the zoetrope, the praxinoscope used a strip of pictures placed around the inner surface of a spinning cylinder. The praxinoscope improved on the zoetrope by replacing its narrow viewing slits with an inner circle of mirrors that intermittently reflected the images. The praxinoscope allowed a much clearer view of the moving image compared to the zoetrope, since the zoetrope's images were actually mostly obscured by the spaces in between its slits. Reynaud mentioned the possibility of projecting the images in his 1877 patent, but did not complete his praxinoscope projection device until 1880.

== Births ==
=== February ===
- February 13: Sidney Smith, American cartoonist (created an animated film series adapting his own comic strip Old Doc Yak, credited as the first animated series with a recurring character; created the popular comic strip The Gumps, which was adapted into a film series combining live-action and animation), (d. 1935).

=== May ===
- May 25: Billy Murray, American singer (voice of Bimbo in the Betty Boop cartoons), (d. 1954).

=== July ===
- July 27: Florence Gill, British actress (voice of Clara Cluck, and the title character in The Wise Little Hen), (d. 1965).

=== August ===
- August 8: Aleksandr Khanzhonkov, Russian cinema entrepreneur, film director, and screenwriter (producer of Ladislas Starevich's ground-breaking stop motion animation), (d. 1945).

=== December ===
- December 14: Harry Hemsley, English comedian, radio presenter, comics artist, illustrator, actor, and animator (made a 1940 animated short based on the characters from his Ovaltiney's Concert Party radio show and comics in which he also voiced himself), (d. 1951).

== Sources ==
- Bendazzi, Giannalberto (1994). Cartoons: One hundred years of cinema animation. Indiana University Press. ISBN 0253209374.
- Myrent, Glenn (1989). "Emile Reynaud: First Motion Picture Cartoonist". Film History. 3 (3). Indiana University Press: 191–202. doi:10.2307/3814977. JSTOR 3814977.
