= KITE (Kansas City) =

Radio station in Kansas City, Missouri (1934–1942)

- Kansas City, Missouri; United States
- Frequency: 1590 kHz

Programming
- Affiliations: Mutual Broadcasting System (evenings)

Ownership
- Owner: First National Television, Inc.

History
- First air date: December 31, 1934
- Last air date: October 8, 1942
- Former call signs: W9XBY (1934–1936); KXBY (1936–1938); KITE (1938–1942); KXKX (June–October 1942)
- Former frequencies: 1530 kHz (1934–1941)

Technical information
- Power: 1,000 watts

KITE was an AM radio station in Kansas City, Missouri, which broadcast from 1934 to 1942. It was initially one of four "high-fidelity" stations broadcasting above 1500 kHz, then the upper end of the broadcast band, in the 1930s, first as W9XBY and later as KXBY and KITE. It transitioned to standard operations in 1941 and changed its call letters to KXKX in July 1942, before going off the air on October 9 of that year.

== History ==
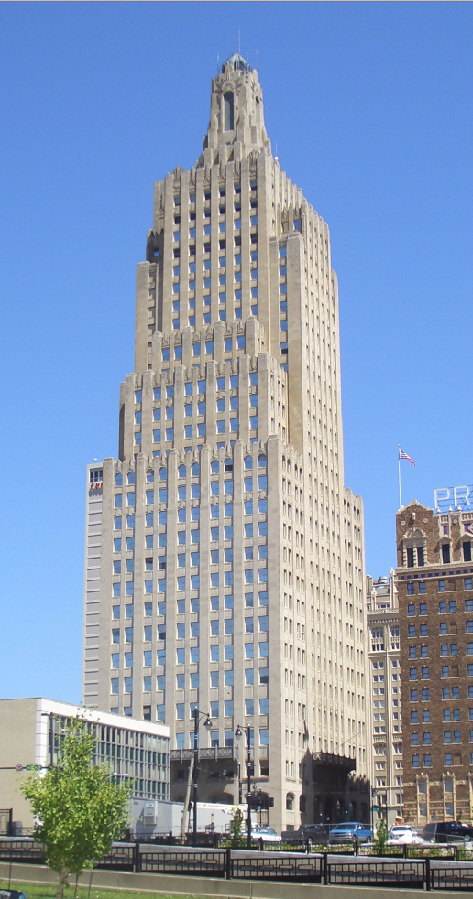
W9XBY went on the air December 31, 1934, from the 29th floor of the Kansas City Power and Light Building

On December 19, 1933, the Federal Radio Commission (FRC) authorized three new frequencies, between 1500 and 1600 kHz, for high-fidelity operation (At the time, the AM broadcast band ended at 1500 kHz.) These 20 kHz-wide channels were twice as wide as the standard AM broadcasting channels. Six applications were heard for the channels in April, of which four were approved. One of those applications came from First National Television, Inc., which proposed using the station for experiments about the efficacy of the upper AM band. First National already operated a radio engineering school with 600 students and held an experimental television license, W9XAL, which by 1934 was broadcasting for three and a half hours each day.

A second Kansas City application was heard at the same time as that of First National, making it the only city where two applicants sought the same frequency. Also seeking a high-fidelity station was the Unity School of Christianity, which was in the midst of a license renewal fight for its station at 1300 kHz, WOQ; the year before, the commission had denied a renewal to WOQ and ordered its time turned over to KFH at Wichita, and the decision was being appealed as the FRC reviewed the applications for the new frequencies.

After being approved on April 20 (with the Unity School application denied), First National Television's station went on the air December 31, 1934, using the experimental call sign W9XBY. (Despite the experimental call sign, the station was authorized for full commercial operation.) First National's new high-fidelity radio station operated from quarters on the 29th floor of the Kansas City Power and Light Building and broadcast 20 hours a day from a transmitter site at 86th and Worrell streets in Kansas City, Missouri. Everett L. Dillard, who had founded WLBF and would later start KOZY, the first FM station in the city, served as continuity director and later chief engineer. A 1935 survey of radios sold in the Kansas City area showed that 91.2 percent of them could receive the station at 1530 kHz.

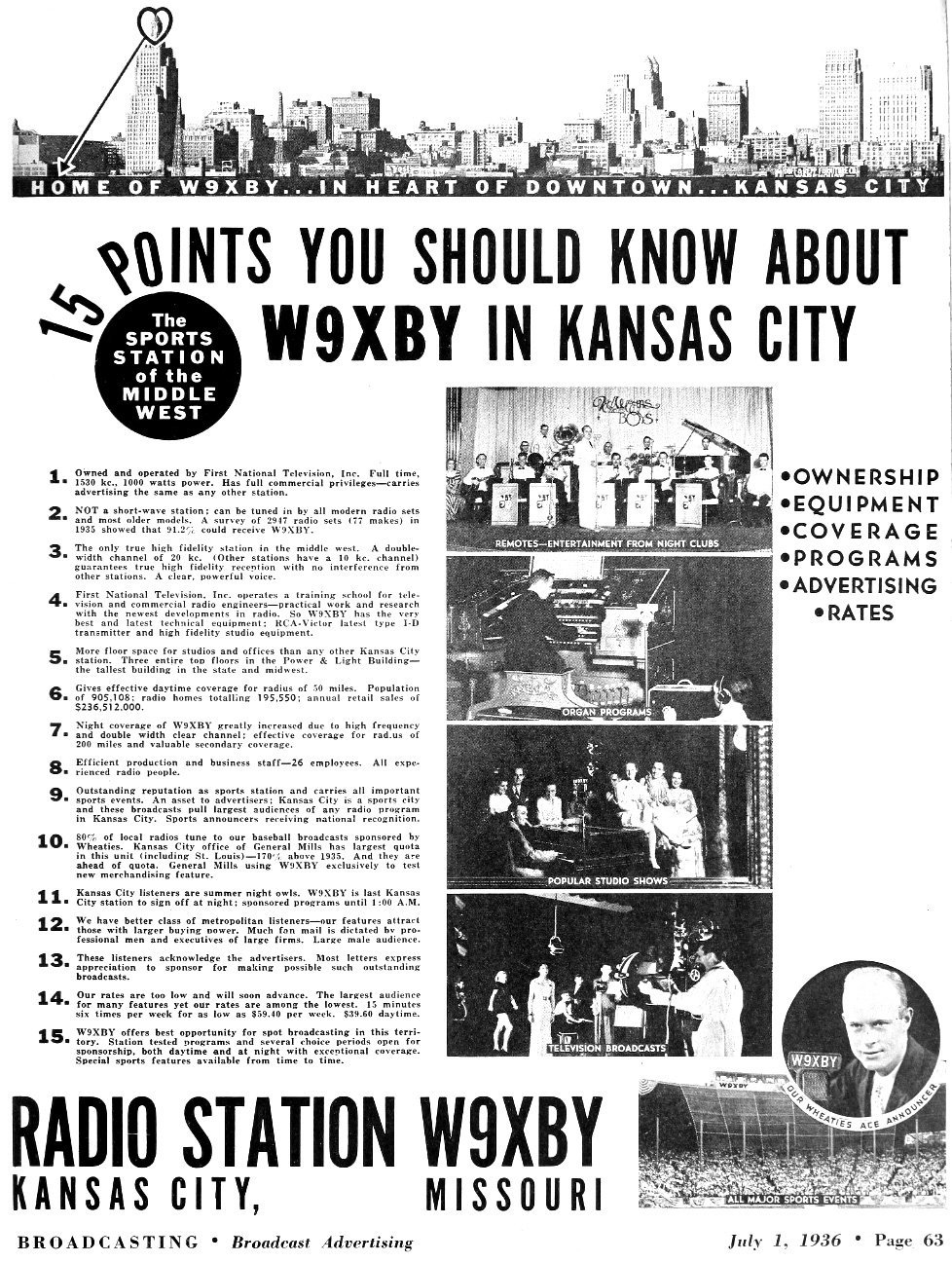
Station advertisement (1936)

In 1934, the Federal Radio Commission was replaced by the Federal Communications Commission (FCC). In November 1936, the FCC allowed the four high-fidelity stations to select conventional call letters. W9XBY ran a contest to select its new designation; given its heavy sports coverage, many listeners suggested the call letters KCSS, for "Kansas City's Sports Station". Ultimately, however, W9XBY management selected KXBY, a variation of its original experimental call sign. KXBY, along with the experimental television station and First National, relocated to new quarters on the 22nd floor of the Fidelity Building in May 1937; W9XAL's broadcasts were simulcast as features on KXBY.

The late 1930s saw ownership turmoil at KXBY. Founders had included Arthur M. Church, the chief owner of KMBC; Sam Pickard, a former FRC commissioner; Leslie Herman, an attorney in New York; Richard K. Phelps, an assistant district attorney in Kansas City; and Sidney Q. Noel, operator of the First National television school. Church withdrew from the company and sued the others, leading to a "highly involved and confused" corporate structure and the introduction of several new stockholders. In May 1938, D. E. "Plug" Kendrick, former manager of station WIRE in Indianapolis and applicant for a new outlet in Louisville, Kentucky, was named as manager of KXBY and set out to reorganize the station's affairs. Kendrick was joined by another Louisville man, M. C. McCarten, as a new stockholder.

Under Kendrick, new KITE call letters went into use on July 1, while a new commercial manager and technical director were appointed. Kites soon appeared across the newly renamed radio station's letterhead, and KITE gave away 15,000 full-sized kites to children through local drug stores. When the North American Regional Broadcasting Agreement came into effect on March 29, 1941, the former high-fidelity stations were relocated, with KITE reassigned to 1590 kHz, and began operation as standard AM stations.

First National Television applied with the FCC in late October 1941 to sell 95 percent of the shares of the company for $50,000 to A. L. Glasman, a Utah movie theatre operator, and Paul R. Heitmeyer; both men were involved in the operation of radio station KLO in Ogden. However, the United States's entry into World War II threw operations into disarray, with Heitmeyer being drafted and reporting for active duty at Fort Leavenworth in January 1942. The sale fell apart and was not consummated.

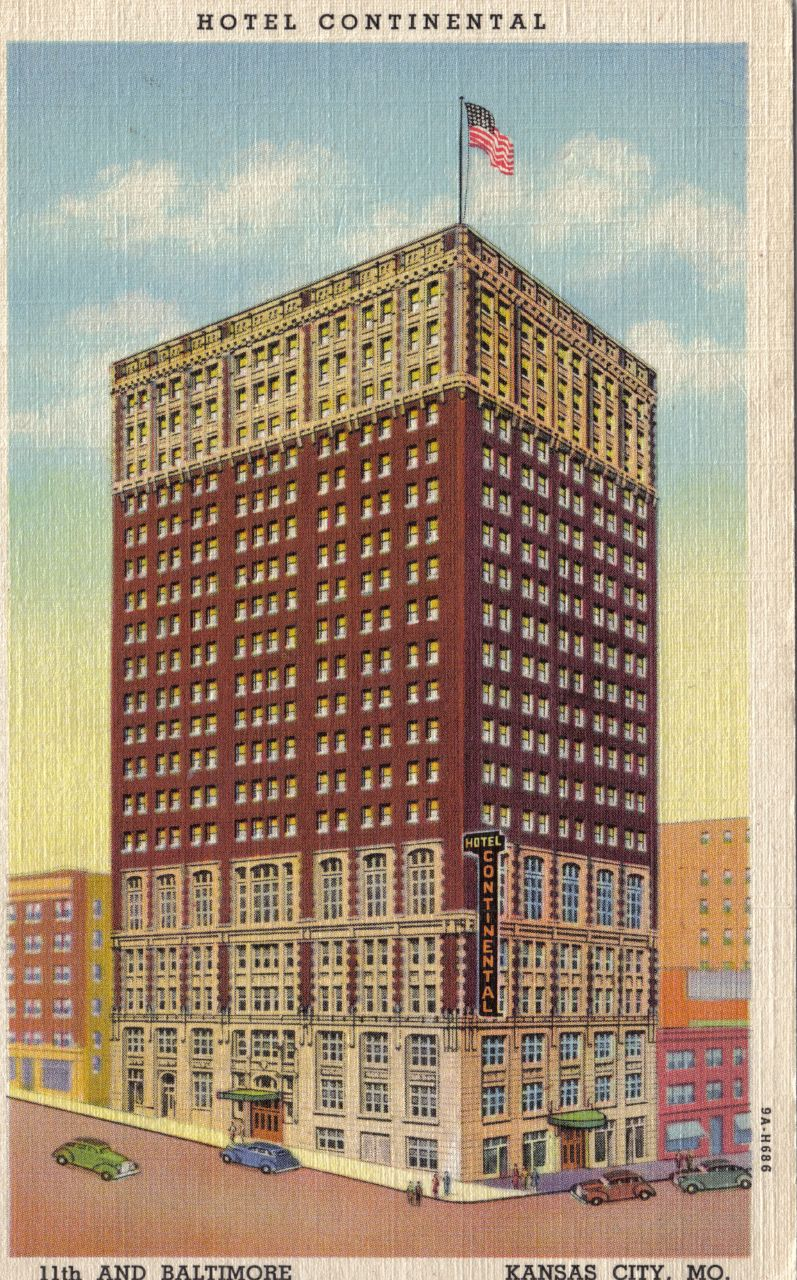
The Hotel Continental served as KXKX's headquarters during its short run

1590 returned to the air as KXKX on July 19, 1942. The new station, managed by Phelps, operated from quarters in the Hotel Continental. It also continued KITE's practice of airing Mutual Broadcasting System network fare in the evenings after WHB, the daytime-only Mutual affiliate in Kansas City, signed off. However, after less than three months, First National no longer had the funds to continue with the operation of its radio station. At the time, the renewal of KXKX's license was pending, but First National failed to appear at an October 5 hearing. KXKX suspended operations on October 8, 1942. A month later, the FCC dismissed the renewal application by default.
