= London's Trafalgar Square =

- Ten surviving frames from the film
- Directed by: Wordsworth Donisthorpe; William Carr Crofts
- Release date: 1890
- Country: United Kingdom
- Language: Silent

London's Trafalgar Square is an 1890 British short silent actuality film, shot by inventors and film pioneers Wordsworth Donisthorpe and William Carr Crofts at approximately 10 frames per second with an oval or circular frame on celuloid film using their 'kinesigraph' camera, showing traffic at Trafalgar Square in London. The surviving ten frames of film are the earliest known motion picture of the city.
