= Lawrence Wright (composer) =

British songwriter and publisher (1888–1964)

- Also known as: Horatio Nicholls
- Born: Frederick Lawrence Wright; 15 February 1888; Leicester, England
- Died: 19 May 1964 (aged 76) Victoria Hospital, Blackpool, England
- Genres: Traditional pop
- Occupations: Composer, music publisher
- Years active: 1906–1962

Frederick Lawrence Wright (15 February 1888 – 19 May 1964) was a British songwriter, music publisher, and the founder of the music journal Melody Maker. He used the pseudonyms Horatio Nicholls and Everett Lynton for his songwriting activities.

== Biography ==
Lawrence Wright was born in Leicester, where his father, Charles Wright, taught violin and ran a market stall selling instruments and sheet music. After leaving school aged 12, he worked for a printing company before joining a concert party in Eastbourne as a violinist and singer. He returned to Leicester and in 1906 set up his own market stall to sell music, including his own composition, "Down by the Stream", which became successful. In 1910, he heard a street singer perform "Don't Go Down the Mine, Daddy". He bought the rights to the song, which he published some weeks later following the Whitehaven mining disaster, in which 136 men were killed; the song reportedly sold a million copies.

In 1911 Wright moved to London, hired a basement in Denmark Street from which to sell his music, and set up the Lawrence Wright Music Company. He was one of the first music publishers to set up business in the street, which in time became known as London's Tin Pan Alley. Wright continued to write songs as Horatio Nicholls, often together with lyricist Worton David. In 1914 they published "Are We Downhearted? No!", which became a popular marching song in the First World War, and in 1919 they collaborated on "That Old-Fashioned Mother of Mine". The song eventually sold three million copies as sheet music, and became the signature song of Talbot O'Farrell, who recorded it in 1920.

Wright started an annual summer show, On With the Show, initially on the Isle of Man, but transferred it to the North Pier at Blackpool in 1925; it ran until 1956, and gave a start to the careers of such performers as Hermione Gingold and Tessie O'Shea. He attempted to bring the show to London, buying the Prince's Theatre in which to stage it in 1934, but the venture failed. In Blackpool, he also introduced the idea of music shops in which customers could sing along, with piano accompaniment, to the latest songs.

In 1926, he founded The Melody Maker, which initially gave special prominence to songs written by him, as "Horatio Nicholls", and published by his own company. The journal became popular, especially among musicians, but because of his conflict of interests Wright sold it to Oldhams Press in 1929; it continued in publication until 2000.

He sometimes billed himself as "The Daddy of Tin Pan Alley", or "The King of British Songwriters". He was famous for promotional stunts, such as riding a camel around Piccadilly Circus to promote his 1924 song "Sahara", and flying the entire Jack Hylton Orchestra around Blackpool Tower in 1927, while dropping sheet music on the visitors, to promote the song "Me and Jane in a Plane". In 1927, Wright appeared in a short film made in the DeForest Phonofilm with excerpts of his revue Sensations of 1927. In 1933 he married the variety star Betty Warren (born Babette Hilda Hogan).

He is credited with co-writing over 500 songs, though "many songs likely bear his name as a condition of acceptance for publication". His most successful songs included "Shepherd of the Hills" and "Among My Souvenirs", both written with the American composer Edgar Leslie; the latter song was recorded successfully by Paul Whiteman, Hoagy Carmichael, Frank Sinatra, Connie Francis, and Marty Robbins, among many others. In 1930 he composed "Amy, Wonderful Amy", a tribute to aviator Amy Johnson with lyrics by Joseph Gilbert. Wright's publishing company also obtained the rights to the compositions of American musicians including Hoagy Carmichael, Fats Waller and Duke Ellington.

He had homes in London and Blackpool. His London home was destroyed by bombing in 1940, and three years later he suffered a stroke which confined him to a wheelchair for the rest of his life. He continued to write songs, and to supervise his publishing interests, and in 1962 received an Ivor Novello Award for Outstanding Contribution to British Popular Music.

He died, aged 76, in Blackpool's Victoria Hospital in 1964, a week after suffering a heavy fall. After his death, his music publishing company was sold to Northern Songs.
