= 1934 in radio =

The year 1934 saw a number of significant happenings in radio broadcasting history.

== Events ==
- 1 January – In New Zealand, station 3YL Christchurch is opened.
- 14 January – The Lucerne Frequency Plan, reallocating long and short wave frequencies in Europe, comes into force.
- February – The government of France suppresses radio reporting of the Stavisky Riots.
- 26 March – In New Zealand, station 4YO Dunedin is opened.
- 1 April – NIROM (Nederlandsch-Indische Radio-omroepmaatschappij), the Dutch East Indies Radio Broadcasting Corporation, begins broadcasting from studios in Batavia and Surabaya.
- 6 May – "Day of the Saar": all Germany's radio stations broadcast propaganda material aiming to influence the result of the 1935 Saar status referendum.
- 28 June – Fireside chat: U.S. President Franklin D. Roosevelt broadcasts a Review of the Achievements of the Seventy-third Congress.
- 1 July – The Federal Communications Commission is created, replacing the Federal Radio Commission in the United States.
- August – At the first congress of the Union of Soviet Writers, several of the union's most prominent figures, such as Alexander Serafimovich and Marietta Shaginyan, comment on the merits of radio as a medium for writers.
- 30 September – Fireside chat: On Moving Forward to Greater Freedom and Greater Security.
- 7 October – In the United Kingdom, the new high-power longwave transmitter at Droitwich takes over from Daventry 5XX as the main station radiating the BBC National Programme.
- 10 December – WJBO is relocated from New Orleans to Baton Rouge and relaunched as WJBO 1150AM.
- EKCO introduces its distinctive round bakelite radio cabinets in the United Kingdom.
- date unknown – Radio Misr is launched in Egypt, the first radio station in the Arabic-speaking world.

== Debuts ==
- 7 January – Herbert W. Armstrong's Radio Church of God The World Tomorrow broadcast (title adopted later) debuts on KORE in Eugene, Oregon (1934–1994).
- 13 January – Al Pearce and His Gang debuts on NBC Blue.
- 10 March – Beatrice Fairfax debuts on NBC.
- 17 March – The Growth of a Poet (about John Masefield) is broadcast by the BBC in Belfast, Northern Ireland.
- 24 March – Let's Pretend debuts on CBS
- 26 March – The Adventures of Frank Merriwell debuts on NBC.
- 16 April – Babe Ruth debuts on the Blue Network.
- April – Major Bowes Amateur Hour debuts on the New York City station WHN.
- May 18 – The Hour of Charm debuts on CBS.
- 15 September – The Gibson Family debuts on NBC.
- 29 September – The Quality Network cooperative is reorganized and renamed the Mutual Broadcasting System. The stations participating in the co-op, all serving as part-owners, include WOR-New York (Bamberger Broadcasting Service/Macy's), WGN-Chicago (Chicago Tribune), WLW-Cincinnati (Crosley Broadcasting Corporation) and WXYZ-Detroit (Kunsky-Trendle Broadcasting).
- 5 October – Hollywood Hotel debuts on CBS.
- 14 October – Lux Radio Theater debuts on NBC Blue for its first year, before moving to CBS for the remainder of its run.
- December – The first episode of Ovaltiney's Concert Party is broadcast, with Harry Hemsley and Gladys Young as presenters.

== Endings ==
- 2 January – Blackstone Plantation ends its run on network radio (NBC).
- 25 February – The American Revue ends its run on network radio (CBS).
- 3 March – Tarzan of the Apes ends its run on WOR.
- 16 November – Bring 'Em Back Alive ends its run on network radio (Blue Network).
- 17 December – The Atwater Kent Hour ends its run on network radio (CBS).

== Births ==
- 1 January – Alan Berg (died 1984), Denver-based liberal radio talk show host, previously an attorney.
- 30 January – Tammy Grimes (died 2016), American actress and singer, host of the final season of CBS Radio Mystery Theater.
- 4 March – John Dunn (died 2004), British radio presenter.
- 25 April – George Bogle, minister and religious broadcaster in Detroit, Michigan.
- 10 May – Gary Owens (died 2015), American radio host and voice actor.
- 5 June – Bryon Butler (died 2001), British radio football correspondent.
- 5 August – Gay Byrne (died 2019), Irish broadcaster.
- 18 December – Michael Freedland (died 2018), British journalist, biographer and broadcaster in London (You Don't Have To Be Jewish).

== Deaths ==
- 8 June – Dorothy Dell, 19, US actress
- 28 July – Marie Dressler, 65, Canadian-born actress, whose 1933 birthday party, hosted by MGM, was broadcast live
- 30 August – Don Lee, 54, pioneer California broadcasting mogul.
- 10 September – George Henschel, 84, singer and pianist (a few months after his first radio performance as a singer)
