= Arthur Rosebery =

English pianist and singer

Arthur Rosebery (1904–1986) was an English pianist and singer. He began working as a pianist in 1921, and a few years later he formed a trio which included Billy Cotton. With his orchestra, the Kit Cat band, Rosebery worked in various London clubs and also made a number of recordings of contemporary dance music, which became very popular in the 1930s.

After World War II, Rosebery worked for some time in West Germany. He changed his name to Al Shine in order to sound more American. Later in his life he worked at Flanagan's Restaurant in London.

In 1930 he and his Kit-Kat Dance Band covered Amy, Wonderful Amy, a song about Amy Johnson.
