= 1883 in animation =

Events in 1883 in animation.

== Events ==
- Specific date unknown
  - In 1883, Eadweard Muybridge met with William Pepper and J.B. Lippincott to discuss a plan for a scientific study focused on the analysis of animal and human movement. The university contributed $5,000, seeing the proposed project as important research that would benefit anthropology, physiology, medicine, and sports. The project was based on Muybridge's work with the zoopraxiscope, and would result in the production of Animal Locomotion (1887).
  - The photographer James Bamforth of Bamforth & Co Ltd began to specialise in making lantern slides. His company would later start production of silent monochrome films with the Riley Brothers of Bradford, West Yorkshire. James Bamforth's expertise with lantern slides proved invaluable in the filmmaking.

== Births ==
=== January ===
- January 30: Eddie Collins, American actor (voice of Dopey in Snow White and the Seven Dwarfs), (d. 1940).

=== July ===
- July 19: Max Fleischer, Polish-American animator, inventor, film director, and film producer (co-founder and head of the animation studio Fleischer Studios, inventor of rotoscoping, the bouncing ball, and the stereopticon process for impression of depth in animation), (d. 1972).

=== November ===
- November 19: Ned Sparks, Canadian actor (voice of Heckle and Jeckle from 1947 to 1951), (d. 1957).

=== Specific date unknown ===
- Helena Smith Dayton, American animator, filmmaker, painter, playwright, and sculptor, (pioneer of stop motion animation and clay animation, directed an animated adaptation of Romeo and Juliet), (d. 1960).

== Deaths ==
=== September ===
- September 15: Joseph Plateau, Belgian physicist, mathematician, and inventor (inventor of the phenakistiscope, the first widespread animation device that created a fluent illusion of motion), dies at age 81.

== Sources ==
- Museum for the History of Sciences, Ghent (2001). "Ghent Scientists: Joseph Plateau".
- Pointer, Ray (2016). The Art and Inventions of Max Fleischer: American Animation Pioneer. McFarland & Co. ISBN 978-1-4766-6367-8.
