= Amy Johnson =

English aviator (1903–1941)

Amy Johnson CBE
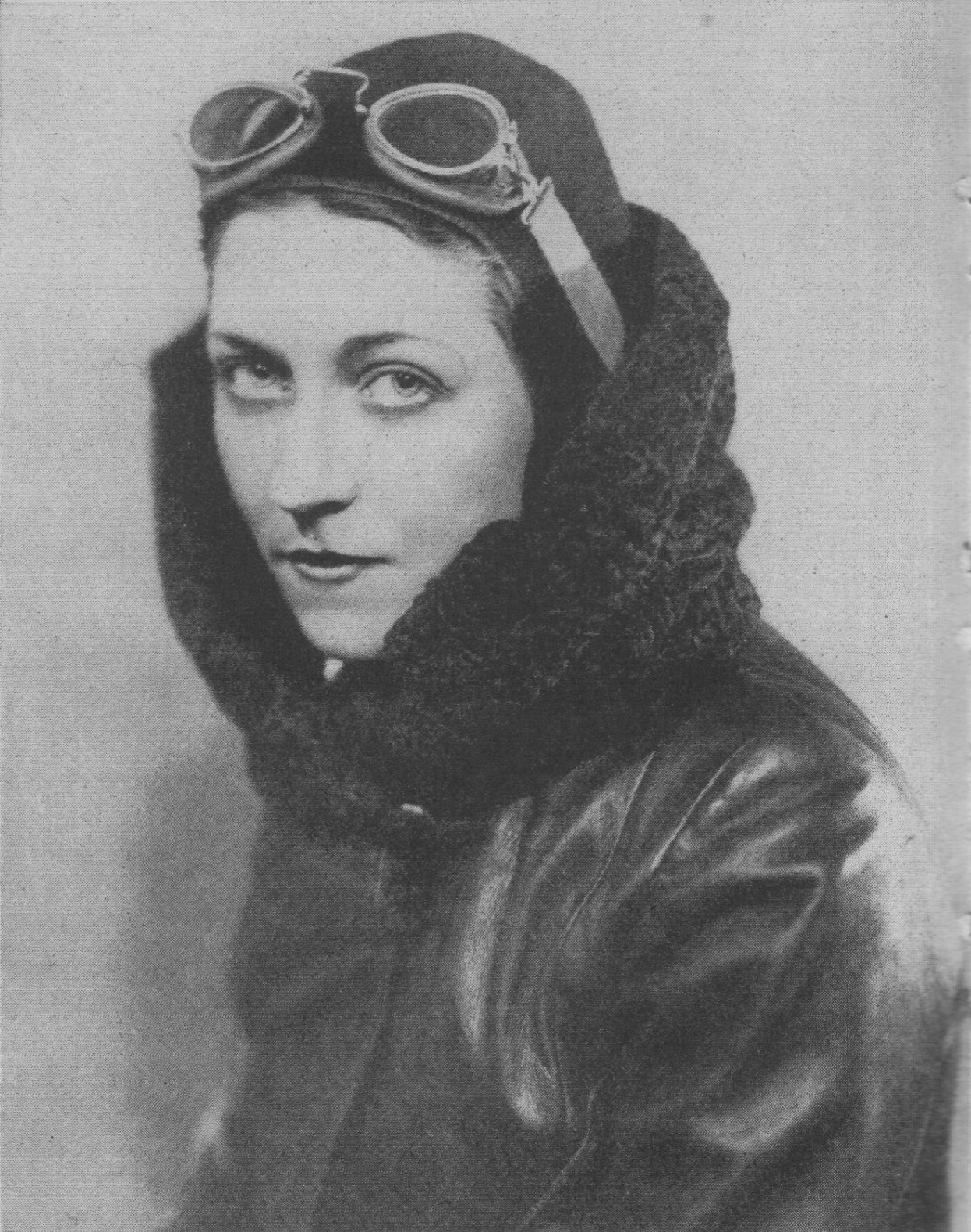
- Johnson, c. 1930
- Born: 1 July 1903; Kingston upon Hull, England, United Kingdom
- Disappeared: 5 January 1941 (aged 37); Thames Estuary, near Herne Bay, England, United Kingdom
- Status: Believed to have died in an aviation accident
- Education: Boulevard Municipal Secondary School
- Alma mater: University of Sheffield
- Occupations: Aviator; engineer
- Spouse: Jim Mollison (m. 1932; div. 1938)
- Awards: Segrave Trophy (1932)

Amy Johnson (born 1 July 1903 – disappeared 5 January 1941) was a pioneering British pilot from Kingston upon Hull, England, who was the first woman to fly solo from London to Australia.

Flying solo or with her husband, Jim Mollison, she set many long-distance records during the 1930s. In 1933, Katharine Hepburn's character in the film Christopher Strong was inspired by Johnson. She flew in the Second World War as a part of the Air Transport Auxiliary. Her aircraft crashed into the Thames Estuary: she died after bailing out. Because her body was never recovered, the precise cause of her death—drowning, hypothermia or being pulled into a warship's moving propellers, is unknown and has been a subject of discussion since the possibility of friendly fire was raised in 1999.

== Early life ==
Born in 1903 in Kingston upon Hull, Amy Johnson was the daughter of Amy Hodge, granddaughter of William Hodge, a Mayor of Hull, and John William Johnson whose family were fish merchants in the firm of Andrew Johnson, Knudtzon and Company. She was the eldest of three sisters, the next in age being Irene who was a year younger.

Johnson was educated at Boulevard Municipal Secondary School, later Kingston High School, and the University of Sheffield, where she graduated with a Bachelor of Arts degree in economics. She then worked in London as secretary to a solicitor, William Charles Crocker. She was introduced to flying as a hobby, gaining an aviator's certificate, No. 8662, on 28 January 1929, and a pilot's "A" licence, No. 1979, on 6 July 1929, both at the London Aeroplane Club under the tutelage of Captain Valentine Baker. In 1929 she became the first British woman to obtain a ground engineer's "C" licence.

Johnson was a friend and collaborator of Fred Slingsby whose Yorkshire based company, Slingsby Aviation of Kirkbymoorside, North Yorkshire, became the UK's most famous glider manufacturer. Slingsby helped found Yorkshire Gliding Club at Sutton Bank and during the 1930s she was an early member and trainee.

== Aviation ==
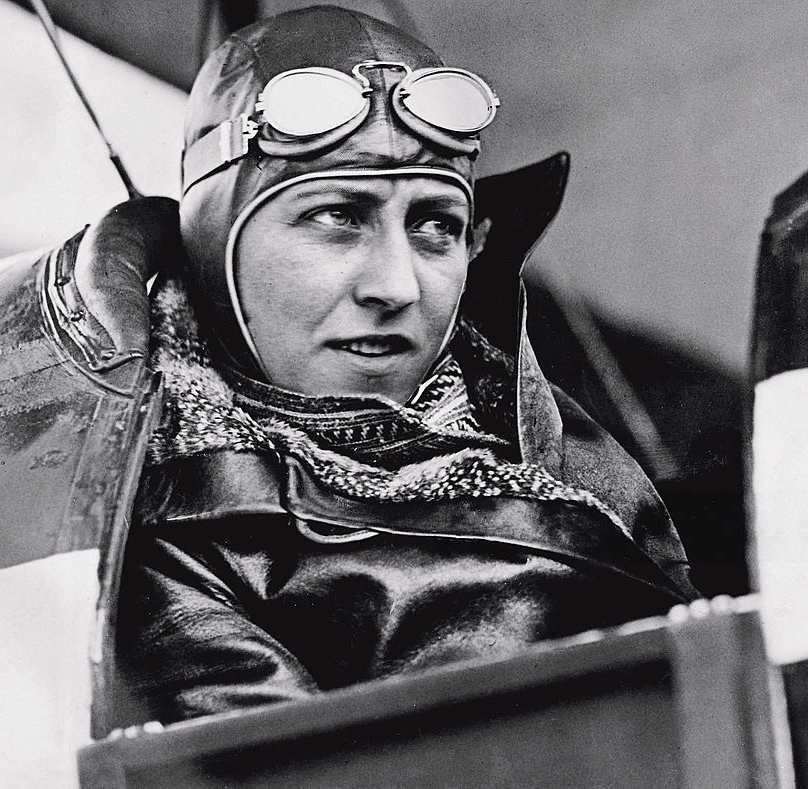
Johnson in her Gipsy Moth leaving Australia for Newcastle, 14 June 1930

Amy Johnson greeted after having flown solo from Britain to Australia

Johnson got the money to buy her first aircraft from her father, who was always one of her strongest supporters, and Lord Wakefield. She bought a secondhand de Havilland DH.60 Gipsy Moth G-AAAH and named it Jason after her father's business trade mark. (Note: Her father was a partner in the Andrew Johnson Knudtzon Fish Merchants.)

In 1930, Johnson achieved worldwide recognition when she became the first woman to fly solo from Britain to Australia. Flying Jason, she left Croydon Airport, Surrey, on 5 May and landed at Darwin, Northern Territory on 24 May, a distance of 11,000 miles (18,000 km). Six days after, she damaged her aircraft while landing downwind at Brisbane airport and flew to Sydney with Captain Frank Follett while the aircraft was repaired. Jason was later flown to Mascot, Sydney, by Captain Lester Brain. Jason is now on permanent display in the Flight Gallery of the Science Museum in London.

She was awarded the Harmon Trophy and also the CBE in George V's 1930 Birthday Honours in recognition of this achievement, and was honoured with the No. 1 civil pilot's licence under Australia's 1921 Air Navigation Regulations. (Note: A de Havilland DH 60G Gipsy Moth G-ABDV, named "Jason III" was given to Johnson on her return to England.)

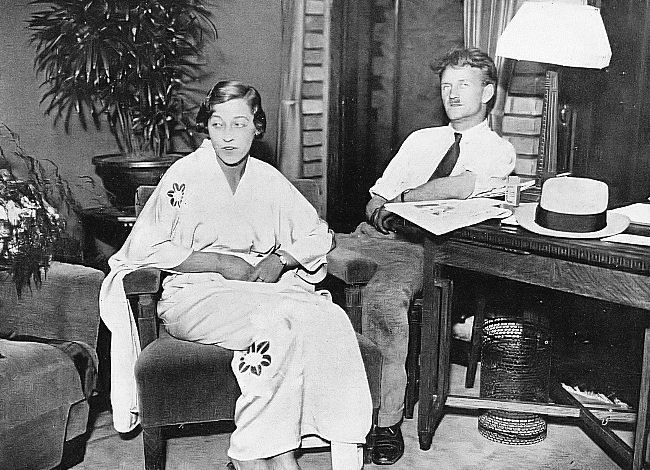
Amy Johnson and Jack Humphreys' visit to Japan, September 1931

Johnson next bought a de Havilland DH.80 Puss Moth G-AAZV which she named Jason II. In July 1931, she and co-pilot Jack Humphreys became the first people to fly from London to Moscow in one day, completing the 1,760 miles (2,830 km) journey in approximately 21 hours. From there, they continued across Siberia and on to Tokyo, setting a record time for Britain to Japan.

In 1932, Johnson married Scottish pilot Jim Mollison, who had proposed to her during a flight together eight hours after they had first met. In July 1932, Johnson set a solo record for a flight from London to Cape Town, South Africa, in the Puss Moth G-ACAB Desert Cloud, breaking her new husband's record. De Havilland Co and Castrol Oil featured this flight in advertising campaigns.

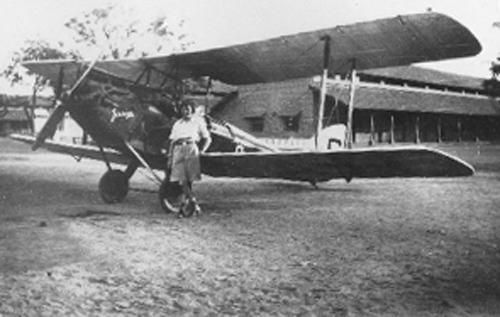
Amy Johnson and Jason in Jhansi, India, in May 1930

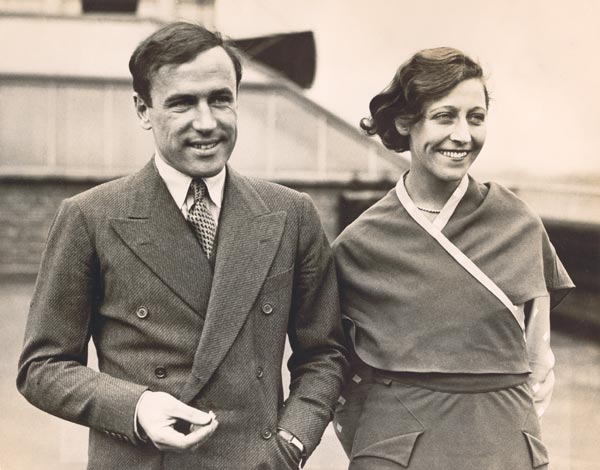
Amy Johnson and Jim Mollison were married on 29 July 1932

In July 1933, Johnson and Mollison attempted to fly the de Havilland DH.84 Dragon I G-ACCV, named Seafarer, nonstop from Pendine Sands, South Wales, heading to Floyd Bennett Field in Brooklyn, New York. They hoped to then fly Seafarer to Baghdad in an attempt to gain the record for a non-stop long-distance flight. Running low on fuel and flying in the dark, the pair made the decision to land short of New York. Spotting the lights of Bridgeport Municipal Airport (now Sikorsky Memorial Airport in Stratford, Connecticut) they circled it five times before crash landing some distance outside the field in a drainage ditch. Both were thrown from the aircraft but suffered only cuts and gashes. After recuperating, the pair were feted by New York society and received a ticker tape parade down Wall Street.

In 1934, the Mollisons set a record time for a flight from Britain to India in a de Havilland DH.88 Comet named Black Magic, as part of the England to Australia MacRobertson Air Race. They were forced to retire from the race at Allahabad because of engine trouble.

In September 1934, Johnson, under her married name of Mollison, became the youngest president of the Women's Engineering Society, having been vice-president since 1934. Johnson succeeded Elizabeth M. Kennedy in the role. Johnson was succeeded as president by Edith Mary Douglas. She was active in the society until her death.

On 4 May 1936, Johnson made her last record-breaking flight, starting from Gravesend Airport and regaining her Britain to South Africa record in G-ADZO, a Percival Gull Six. In 1936, she was awarded the Gold Medal of the Royal Aero Club.

She further honed her gliding skills with the Midland Gliding Club, based in Shropshire, which she joined in October 1937, and remained an active flying member until gliding was suspended following the outbreak of the Second World War. In 1938, Johnson overturned her glider, when landing after a display at Walsall Aerodrome in England, but was not seriously hurt. Following the accident, she told reporters, "I still declare that gliding is the safest form of flying."

She divorced Mollison in 1937 and reverted to her maiden name. Johnson began to explore other ways to make a living through business ventures, journalism and fashion. She modelled clothes for the designer Elsa Schiaparelli who created for her a travelling bag sold under her own name.

In 1939, Johnson found work flying with the Portsmouth, Southsea and Isle of Wight Aviation Company, piloting short flights across the Solent and flying a target tug for searchlight batteries and anti-aircraft gunners to practise on.

== Second World War ==
During the Second World War, Johnson's employing company's aircraft were taken over by the Air Ministry in March 1940. She was served a notice of redundancy alongside all other pilots in the company, as all the aircraft were requisitioned for the war effort. She received a week's pay and a further four weeks' pay of £40 as a redundancy package.

Two months later, Johnson joined the newly formed Air Transport Auxiliary (ATA), which transported Royal Air Force aircraft around the country. She rose to first officer under the command of her friend and fellow pilot Pauline Gower. Her former husband also flew for the ATA throughout the war. Johnson described a typical day in her life in the ATA in a humorous article, published posthumously in 1941, for The Woman Engineer journal.

== Death ==
In a last letter to her friend, Caroline Haslett, on New Year's Day 1941, Johnson wrote: "I hope the gods will watch over you this year, and I wish you the best of luck (the only useful thing not yet taxed!)". On 5 January 1941, while flying an Airspeed Oxford for the ATA from Prestwick via RAF Squires Gate to RAF Kidlington near Oxford, it is suggested that Johnson ran out of fuel in adverse weather conditions.

Five hours after her departure, a convoy of wartime vessels in the Thames Estuary spotted a parachute coming down and saw a person alive in the water calling for help, witnesses describing the voice as female. Conditions were poor: there was a heavy sea and a strong tide, snow was falling and it was intensely cold. Lt Cmdr Walter Fletcher, the Captain of HMS Haslemere, (Note: Haslemere was a small, former ferry that in Royal Navy wartime service was being used as a barrage balloon ship.) navigated his ship to attempt a rescue. The crew of the vessel threw ropes out to the person but they were unable to reach them and they were lost under the ship. A number of witnesses believed there was a second body in the water.

Fletcher dived in and swam out to what some witnesses described as possibly being a body of someone wearing a flying helmet, rested on it for a few minutes and then let go. When the lifeboat reached him he was unconscious and as a result of the intense cold he died in the hospital days later. Johnson's watertight flying bag, her log book and cheque book later washed up, and were recovered near the crash site.

A memorial service was held for Johnson in the church of St Martin-in-the-Fields on 14 January 1941. Lt Cmdr Walter Fletcher was posthumously awarded the Albert Medal in May 1941.

=== Disputed circumstances ===
In 1999, it was reported that Johnson's death may have been caused by friendly fire. Tom Mitchell, from Crowborough, Sussex, claimed to have shot Johnson's aircraft down when she twice failed to give the correct identification code during the flight. Mitchell explained how the aircraft was sighted and contacted by radio. A request was made for the signal. She gave the wrong one twice. "Sixteen rounds of shells were fired and the plane dived into the Thames Estuary. We all thought it was an enemy plane until the next day when we read the papers and discovered it was Amy. The officers told us never to tell anyone what happened."

In 2016, Alec Gill, a historian, claimed that the son of a ship's crew member stated that Johnson had died because she was sucked into the blades of the ship's propellers. The crewman did not observe this to occur, but believes it is true.

As a member of the ATA with no known grave and her body never recovered, Johnson is commemorated, under the name of Amy V. Johnson, by the Commonwealth War Graves Commission on the Air Forces Memorial at Runnymede.

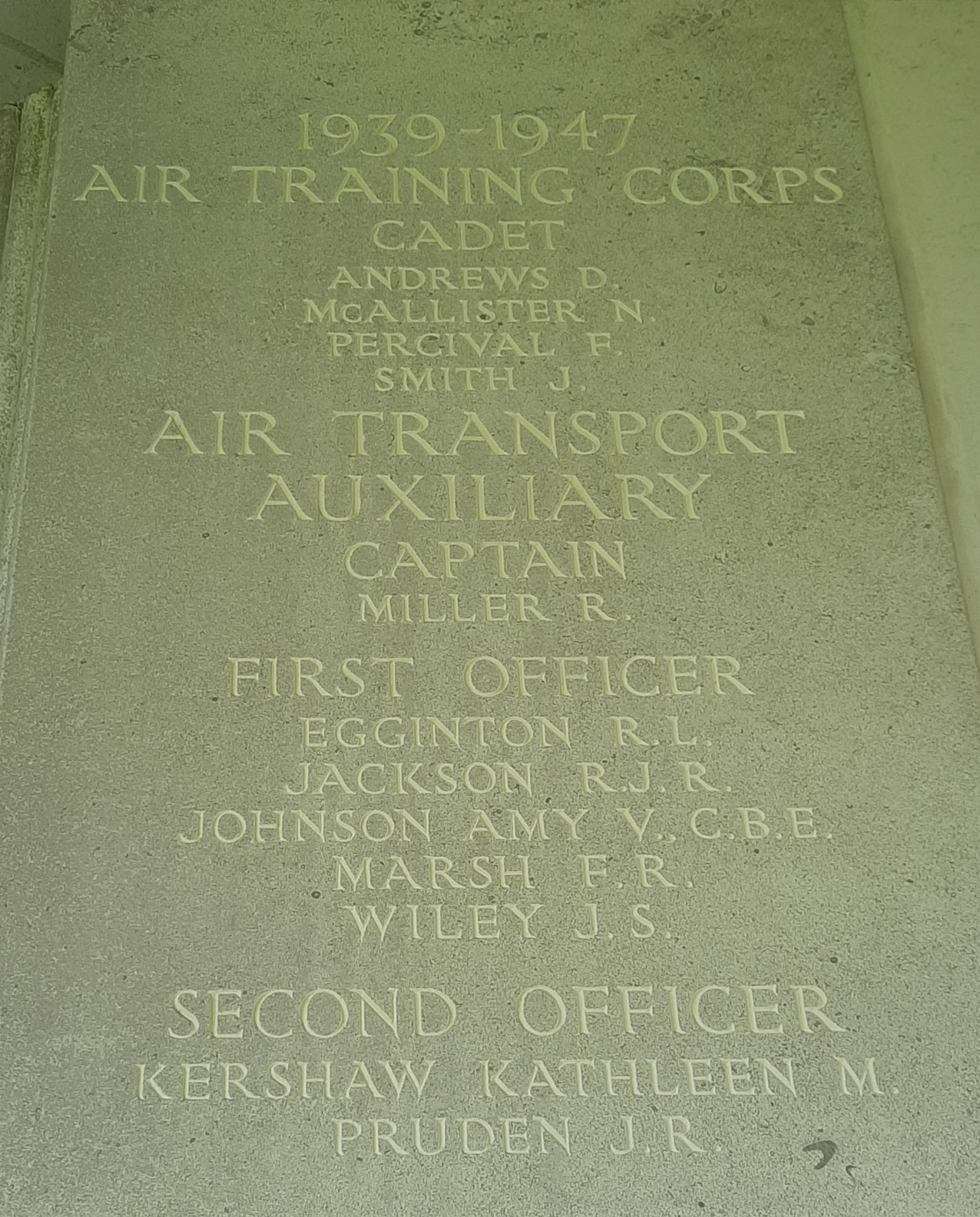
A memorial for UK Air Transport Auxiliary personnel, who went missing presumed dead during the Second World War

== Honours and tributes ==
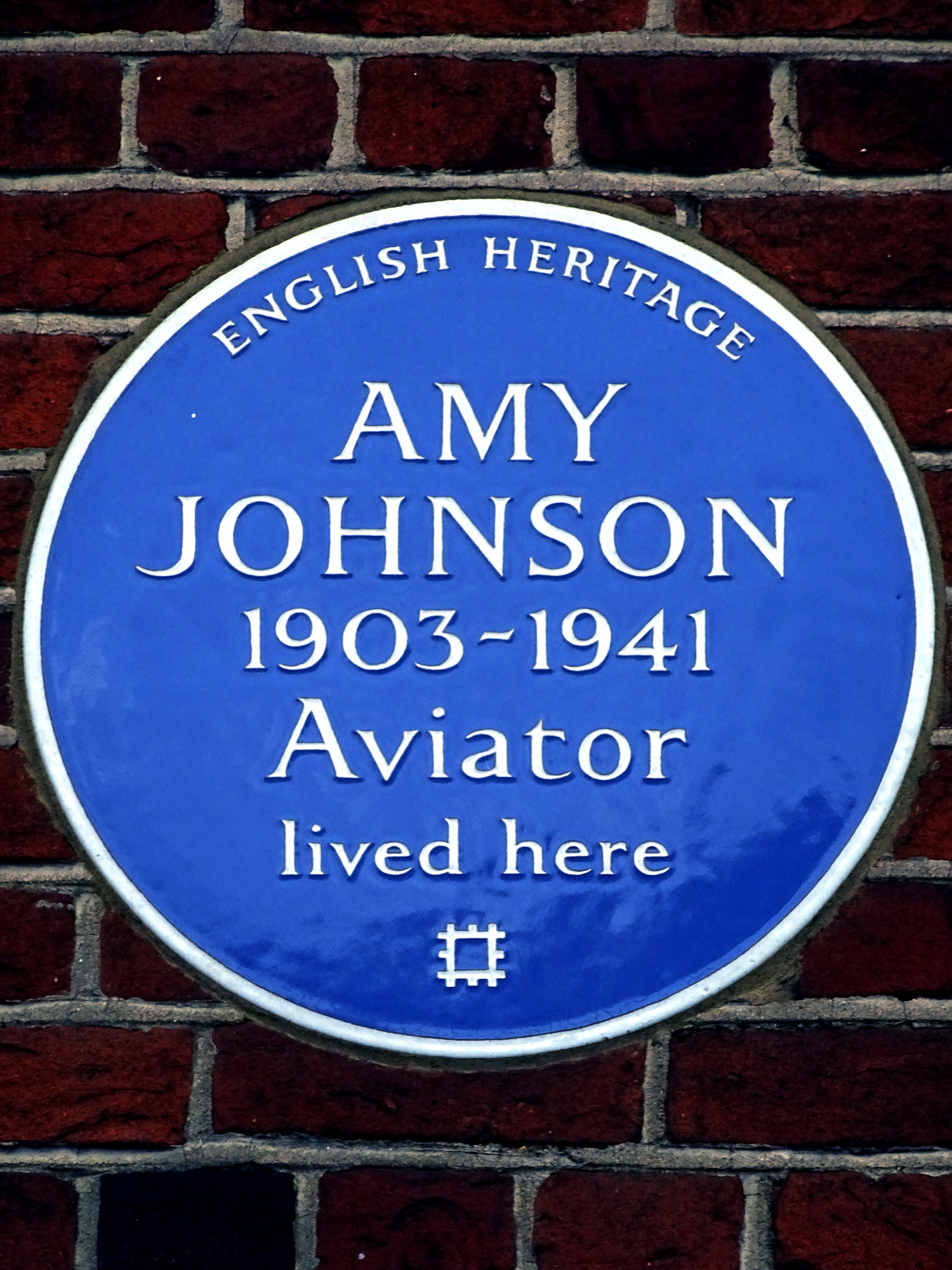
English Heritage blue plaque at Vernon Court, Cricklewood, London

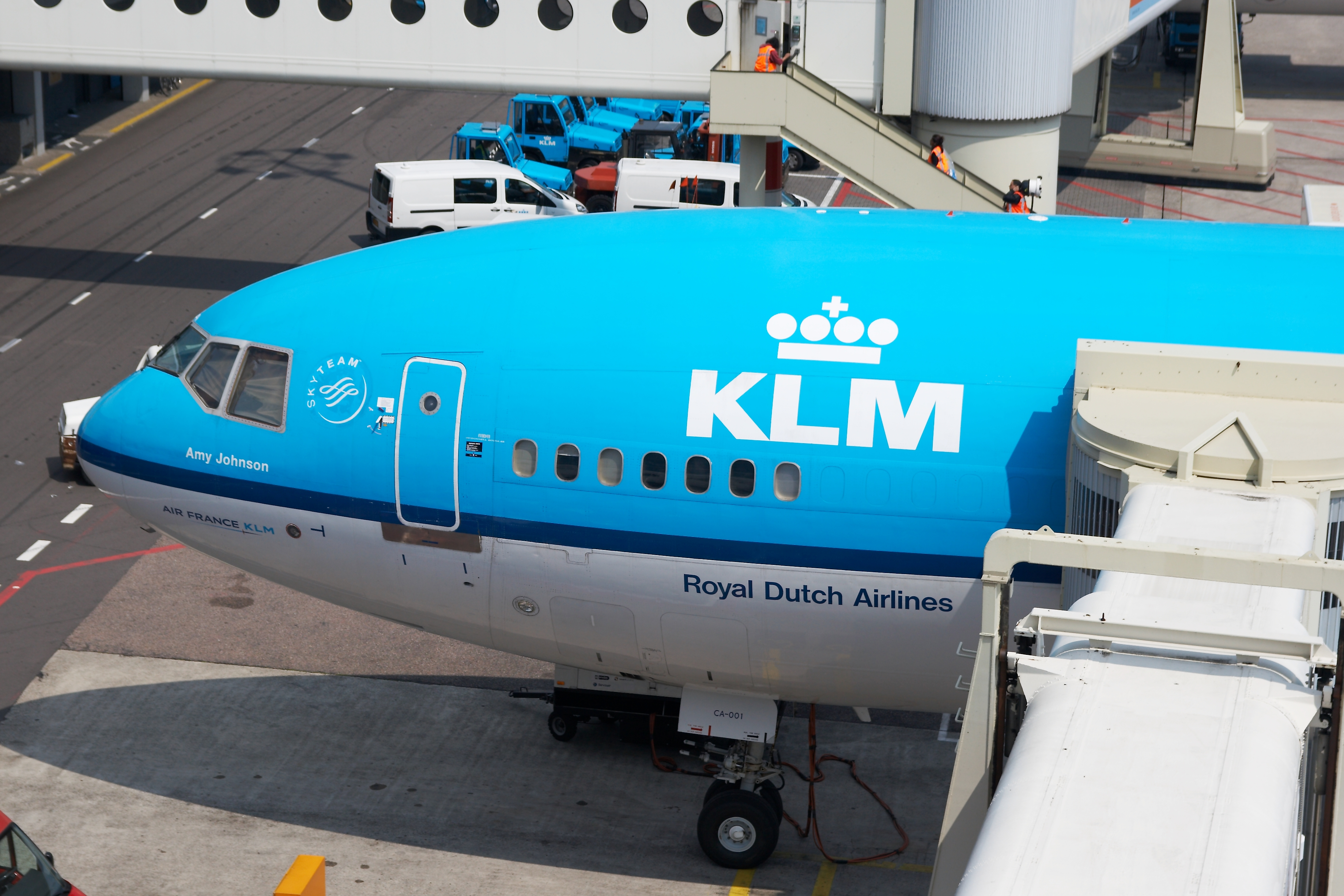
The KLM McDonnell Douglas MD-11 named Amy Johnson

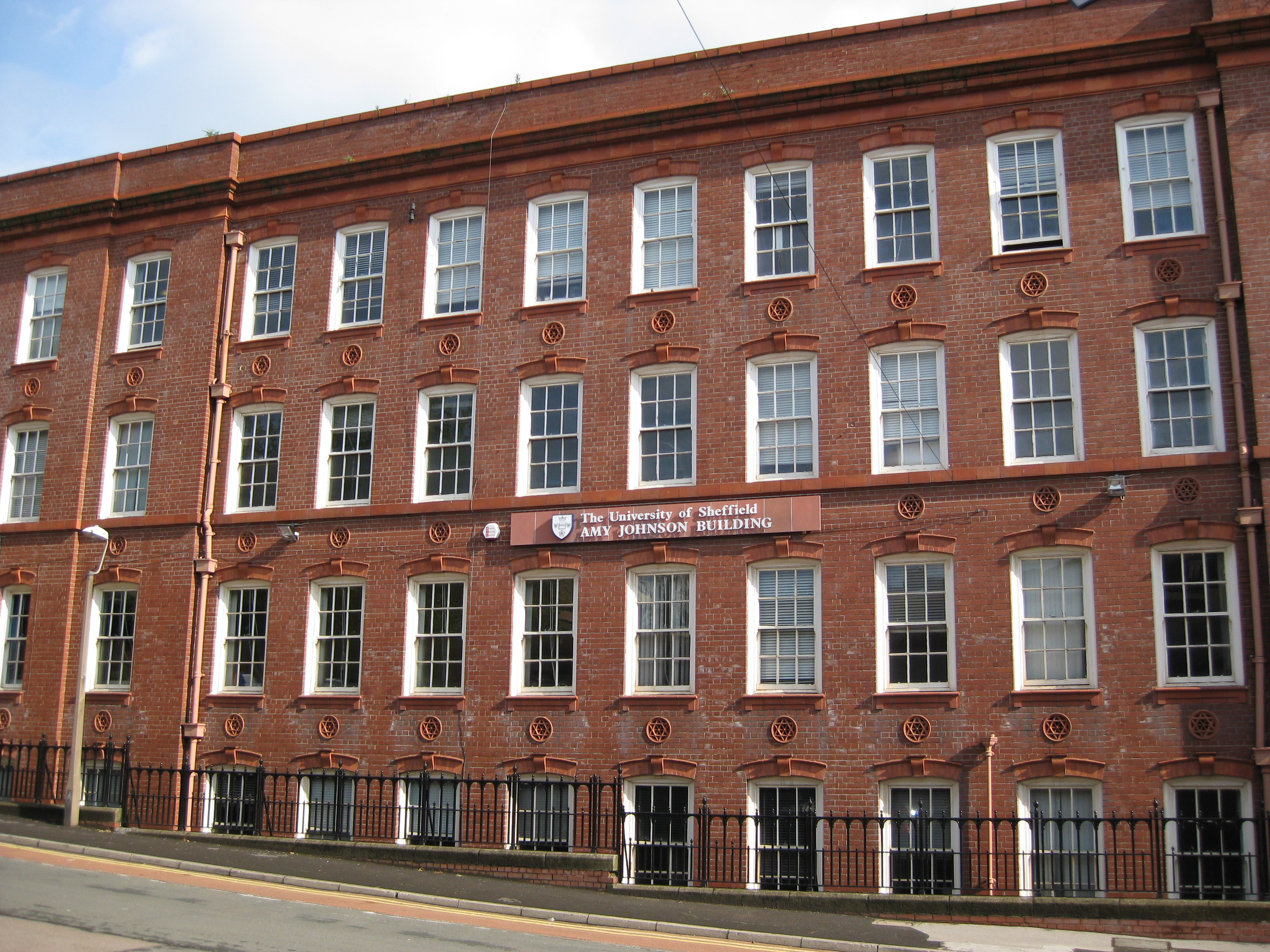
Amy Johnson Building, University of Sheffield

In June 1930, Johnson's flight to Australia was the subject of a contemporary popular song, "Amy, Wonderful Amy", composed by Horatio Nicholls and recorded by Harry Bidgood, Jack Hylton, Arthur Lally, Arthur Rosebery and Debroy Somers. She was also the guest of honour at the opening of the first Butlins holiday camp, in Skegness in 1936. From 1935 to 1937, Johnson was President of the Women's Engineering Society.

1929 built Aveling and Porter steam roller No. 12467 was named after Johnson in 1930. One of three steam rollers that was supposed to go to Australia, disappointment with the first engine resulted in the other two staying in the UK, with No. 12467 being sold to the Bilston Corporation, Wolverhampton. The current owner was told by the previous owner that the engine was named after Johnson when she visited the area, not long after the engine arrived. The Steam Roller is preserved in private ownership to this day, and carries the nameplate 'Amy'.

A collection of Amy Johnson souvenirs and mementos was donated by her father to Sewerby Hall in 1958. The hall now houses a room dedicated to Amy Johnson in its museum.

In 1974, Harry Ibbetson's statue of Amy Johnson was unveiled in Prospect Street, Hull city centre.

In 2016, new statues of Johnson were unveiled to commemorate the 75th anniversary of her death. The first, on 17 September, was at Herne Bay, Kent close to the site where she was last seen alive, and the second, on 30 September, was unveiled by Maureen Lipman near Hawthorne Avenue, Hull, on the now demolished (2004) site of the school named after her, also close to Johnson's childhood home. In 2017, The Guardian listed this second statue as one of the "best female statues in Britain".

A blue plaque commemorates Johnson at Vernon Court, Hendon Way, in Childs Hill, London NW2. She is commemorated with a green plaque on The Avenues, Kingston upon Hull. She is commemorated with another blue plaque in Princes Risborough where she lived for a year.

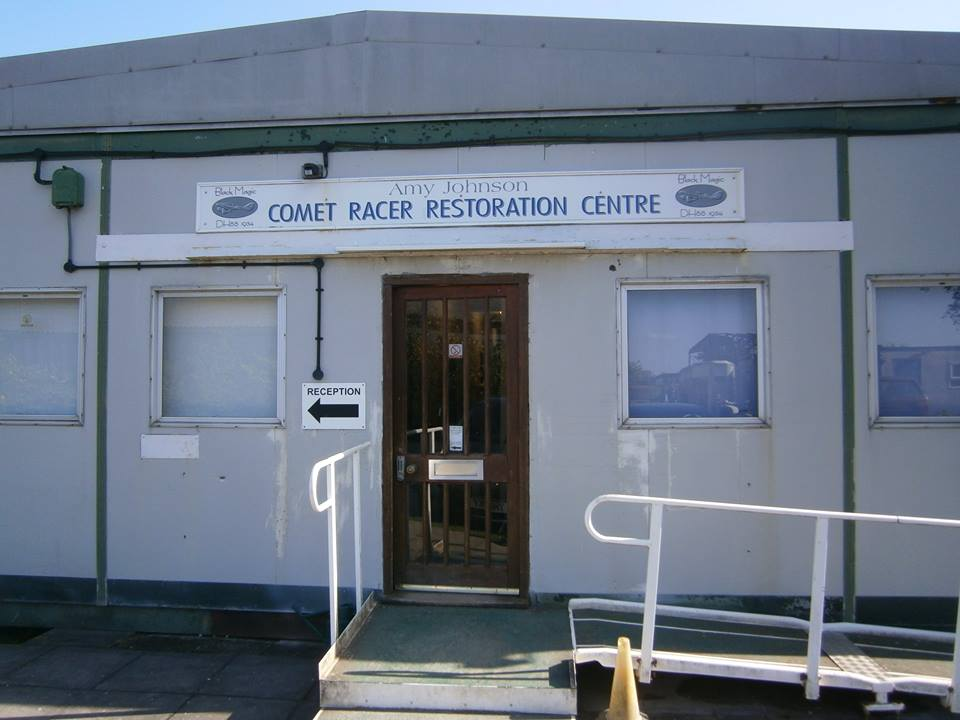
The Amy Johnson Comet Restoration Centre, 2017

Buildings named in Johnson's honour include:

- "Amy Johnson Building" housing the department of Automatic Control and Systems Engineering at the University of Sheffield.
- "Amy Johnson Primary School" situated on Mollison Drive on the Roundshaw Estate, Wallington, Surrey, which is built on the former runway site of Croydon Airport.
- "The Hawthornes @ Amy Johnson" in Hull, a major housing development by Keepmoat Homes on the site of the former Amy Johnson School.
- "Amy Johnson Comet Restoration Centre" at Derby Airfield, where the Mollisons' DH.88 Comet Black Magic is being restored to flying condition.
- "Amy Johnson House" in Cherry Orchard Road, Croydon was named for her; built in the 20th century, it was demolished in the mid-2010s.
- "Amy's Restaurant and Bar" at the Hilton hotels at both London Gatwick and Stansted airports are named after her.

Plate commemorating the women of Hessle Road, including Johnson, on display at Hull Maritime Museum

Other tributes to Johnson include a KLM McDonnell-Douglas MD-11 named after her in 1993. After that aircraft was retired, a Norwegian Air UK Boeing 787-9 added a commemorative tail fin in her honour.

"Amy Johnson Avenue" is a main road running northwards from Tiger Brennan Drive, Winnellie, to McMillans Rd, Karama, in Darwin, Australia.

"Amy Johnson Way" is a road linking commercial premises in Blackpool, Lancashire, UK, adjacent to Blackpool Airport. It is also the name of a road in Clifton Moor, York.

"Johnson Road" is one of the roads built on the site of the former Heston Aerodrome in west London.

In 2011 the Royal Aeronautical Society established the annual Amy Johnson Named Lecture to celebrate a century of women in flight (Note: In 1911, Hilda Hewlett became the first British woman to earn her pilot's licence.) and to honour Britain's most famous female aviator. Carolyn McCall, Chief Executive of EasyJet, delivered the Inaugural Lecture on 6 July 2011 at the Society's headquarters in London. The Lecture is held on or close to 6 July every year to mark the date in 1929 when Amy Johnson was awarded her pilot's licence.

Over a six-month period, inmates of Hull Prison built a full-size model of the Gipsy Moth aircraft used by Johnson to fly solo from Britain to Australia. In February 2017 this went on public display at Hull Paragon Interchange.

In 2017, Google commemorated Johnson's 114th birthday with a Google Doodle.

In 2017, the airline Norwegian painted the tail fin of two of its aircraft with a portrait of Johnson. She is one of the company's "British tail fin heroes", joining Queen singer Freddie Mercury, children's author Roald Dahl, England's World Cup winning captain Bobby Moore and aviation entrepreneur Sir Freddie Laker.

A mural reading QUEEN OF THE AIR (which was a nickname the British press gave Johnson) was painted in Cricklewood railway station to commemorate the 100-year anniversary of women obtaining the right to vote in the UK.

St Mary's Church in Beverley, East Yorkshire announced their intention of installing a stone carving of Amy Johnson as part of a programme of celebrating women in the restoration of the stonework of the medieval church in 2021. The other eight figures will include fellow engineer and WES member Hilda Lyon, Mary Wollstonecraft, Mary Seacole, Marie Curie, Rosalind Franklin, Helen Sharman and Ada Lovelace.

== In popular culture ==
Johnson's life has been the subject of a number of treatments in film and television, some more accurately biographical than others. In 1942, a film of Johnson's life, They Flew Alone, (released in the US as Wings and the Woman) was made by director-producer Herbert Wilcox, starring Anna Neagle as Johnson and Robert Newton as Mollison.

Amy! (1980) was an avant-garde documentary written and directed by feminist film theorist Laura Mulvey and semiologist Peter Wollen. A 1984 BBC television film Amy starred Harriet Walter in the title role. In the 1991, Australian television miniseries The Great Air Race, aka Half a World Away, based on the 1934 MacRobertson Air Race, Johnson was portrayed by Caroline Goodall.

Johnson earned a passing mention in other works such as the 2007 British film adaption of Noel Streatfeild's 1936 novel Ballet Shoes, in which the character Petrova is inspired by Johnson in her dreams of becoming an aviator.

In radio, the 2002 BBC Radio broadcast The Typist who Flew to Australia, a play by Helen Cross, presented the theme that Johnson's aviation career was prompted by years of boredom in an unsatisfying job as a typist and sexual adventures including a seven-year affair with a Swiss businessman who married someone else.

In music, Johnson inspired a number of works, including the song "Flying Sorcery" from British singer-songwriter Al Stewart's album, Year of the Cat (1976). A Lone Girl Flier and Just Plain Johnnie (Jack O'Hagan) sung by Bob Molyneux, and Johnnie, Our Aeroplane Girl sung by Jack Lumsdaine. Queen of the Air (2008) by Peter Aveyard is a musical tribute to Johnson. Indie pop band The Lucksmiths used a clip of her Australia welcome speech as an intro to their song The Golden Age of Aviation.

More fictionalised portrayals include a Doctor Who Magazine comic story in 2013 titled "A Wing and a Prayer", in which the time-travelling Doctor encounters Johnson in 1930. He tells Clara Oswald her death is a fixed point in time. Clara realises what's important is that it appears Amy died. They save her from drowning and then take her to the planet Cornucopia.

The character Worrals in the series of books by Captain W. E. Johns was modelled on Amy Johnson.

In 2023, screenwriter Sally Wainwright, best known for Happy Valley, revealed that she was interested in writing a drama about Johnson but "failed to convince" TV channels.

== Gallery ==
Amy Johnson discusses plans for her tour

Amy Johnson speaks about her England-Australia solo flight

Amy Johnson flying to Cape Town seeking husband's record

== See also ==
- List of fatalities from aviation accidents
- List of female explorers and travelers
- List of people who disappeared mysteriously at sea
