= Debroy Somers =

British dance band leader (1890–1952)

Debroy Somers (born William Henry Somers; 11 April 1890, – 27 May 1952) was a British dance band leader.

Somers was born in Dublin, Ireland. He had trained as a musician at the Duke of York's Royal Military School in Chelsea, 1900-1905 where he was entered by his mother Clara (a nurse) after the death of his father William, Sergeant Drummer Gloucestershire Regiment, on St. Helena after 25 years service. He made the rank of colour corporal.

He continued his studies in Dublin under Signor Michele Esposito at The Royal Irish Academy of Music in 1904. At the age of 15 he joined the 2nd Battalion of the Royal Irish Regiment as a boy bandsman before retiring in 1913. He rejoined his old regiment in 1916 retiring as a sergeant musician in 1918; being demobilised in Wiltshire.

His period of celebrity stretched from the 1920s to the 1940s. He appeared in numerous films, including Second Choice, Stars on Parade and Aunt Sally, and founded the 11-piece dance band The Savoy Orpheans. On 15 June 1925, Somers conducted the first British performance of George Gershwin's Rhapsody in Blue from the Savoy Hotel with the Orpheans, alongside the Savoy Havana Band and Gershwin himself on piano. The performance was broadcast live by the BBC.

His ensemble, the Debroy Somers Band, was also known as the Midnight Minstrels. In 1930, they covered "Amy, Wonderful Amy", a song about Amy Johnson. Before the war Somers was a regular broadcaster on Radio Luxembourg, acting as musical director for several regular shows, including the children's show Ovaltineys and Shipmates Ashore for the Merchant Navy.

In 1943, he returned to London's West End to direct the hit show The Lisbon Story at the Hippodrome. He was also director for Tom Arnold and Robert Nesbitt's production of Latin Quarter at the London Casino in 1949. His last production was as musical director for George Formby's Zip Goes a Million at the Palace Theatre in 1951, but he collapsed and died in London during the run of the show in May 1952, aged 62.

Somers married a widow, Doddy Payne (nee Watts) on 9 September 1912 in Fulham, London; she already had three children from her previous marriage. The family home remained in Twickenham, Middlesex, for many years.
