= Amy, Wonderful Amy =

1930s popular song

"Amy, Wonderful Amy" is a 1930 popular song, written by Joseph G. Gilbert and composed by Lawrence Wright (some sources credit him under his pseudonym Horatio Nicholls) about British aviator Amy Johnson. It was recorded by Jack Hylton and his orchestra on 2 June 1930, with J. Pat O'Malley providing vocals, and released on HMV B-5836. The banjo and ukulele arrangement was provided by Alvin Keech. While at least ten songs were written about her at the time, "Amy Wonderful Amy" is the most famous.

== Background ==
Amy Johnson was an English aviator who in 1930 flew solo from the United Kingdom all the way to Australia. She was the first female pilot to do so. After landing in Australia, she became world famous overnight, and the euphoria inspired Joseph G. Gilbert and Lawrence Wright to write a song about a man who expresses his admiration and love for her.

The song has an instrumental break in which a news reporter describes her flying past several locations (Vienna, Baghdad, Karachi, Port Darwin and Brisbane, Australia) until he fears that she might have crashed, but it turns out she is safe after all. After a reprisal of the refrain the song ends with sounds of people cheering.

== Recording ==
It was recorded by Jack Hylton and his orchestra only nine days after Johnson's arrival. Ten per cent of the royalties would be sent to The Daily Sketch fund to buy her a new plane.

== Other versions ==
The song has also been recorded by:

- 1930 - The Rhythm Maniacs, sang by Maurice Erwin.
- 1930 - The Debroy Somers Band, sang by Tom Barratt.
- 1930 - Harry Bidgood & His Band.
- 1930 - Chris Hall, aka John Thorne.
- 1930 - Arthur Lally & The Million-Airs.
- 1930 - Arthur Rosebery & His Kit-Kat Dance Band.
- 1930 - Tom Barratt.
- 1930 - G. Dunnet.
- 1930 - Dick Denton.
- 1930 - Teddy Brown
