= Ovaltineys =

Former British children's club

The front cover of the Official Rule Book of The League of Ovaltineys

Ovaltineys or League of Ovaltineys was a children's club developed in the 1930s to promote the sale of Ovaltine brand drink in the United Kingdom.

== Original Ovaltineys ==
The League of Ovaltineys was founded in 1935 and achieved five million members in 1939. Members of the club received a membership badge and rule book and the chance to take part in competitions and other activities. There was a weekly comic too.

The League had its own radio show, Ovaltiney's Concert Party, on the commercial station Radio Luxembourg, sponsored by the manufacturer, at a time when there was no commercial radio with advertising in the UK. Few people had televisions, and radio was all-important as a medium, and had huge audiences. The show was broadcast on Sunday evenings between 5.30pm and 6pm over the powerful Long Wave transmitter and the show became well known throughout the UK for its theme song We Are The Ovaltineys which was also available as sheet music. This advertising jingle, which featured the popular English singing trio The Beverley Sisters, was regarded as one of the most successful jingles of the era.

== Revivals ==
In 1952 a new version of the Ovaltineys' show was aired once more at 6:15 pm on Sunday evenings over Radio Luxembourg on its new 208m (1439kHz) Medium Wave transmitter.

In the late 1960s the Ovaltineys' Club was relaunched and aimed at modern children and, in addition to their badge, members received a record with instrumental songs performed in a "pop" style. The presidents of the new club were the British comedy team of Morecambe and Wise.

In 1975 the song We Are The Ovaltineys came back to a new audience when it was used by Ovaltine in a TV advertisement and released as a single record.

== Jingle lyrics ==
Theme Tune introduction
We are the Ovaltineys
Little girls and boys,
Make your request we'll not refuse you
We are here just to amuse you.
Would you like a song or story
Will you share our joys?
At games and sports we're more than keen,
No merrier children could be seen,
Because we all drink Ovaltine,
We're happy girls and boys.

Theme song - signing off lyrics
And now the happy Ovaltineys
Wish you all adieu,
But don't forget your Ovaltine
It's very good for you.
But we'll be here again next Sunday
With songs and stories new,
And so until we meet again
The Ovaltineys bid you all adieu.
