= 1878 in animation =

Events in 1878 in animation.

== Events ==
- January 24: Following the introduction of the phonograph by Thomas Edison in November 1877, an article in Scientific American concluded "It is already possible, by ingenious optical contrivances, to throw stereoscopic photographs of people on screens in full view of an audience. Add the talking phonograph to counterfeit their voices and it would be difficult to carry the illusion of real presence much further". Wordsworth Donisthorpe announced in the 24 January 1878 edition of Nature that he would advance that conception: "By combining the phonograph with the kinesigraph I will undertake not only to produce a talking picture of Mr. Gladstone which, with motionless lips and unchanged expression shall positively recite his latest anti-Turkish speech in his own voice and tone. Not only this, but the life size photograph itself shall move and gesticulate precisely as he did when making the speech, the words and gestures corresponding as in real life." A Dr. Phipson repeated this idea in a French photography magazine, but renamed the device "Kinétiscope" to reflect the viewing purpose rather than the recording option. This was picked up in the United States and discussed in an interview with Edison later in the year.
- June: In June 1878, Eadweard Muybridge created sequential series of photographs, now with a battery of 12 cameras along the race track at Leland Stanford's Palo Alto Stock Farm (now the campus of Stanford University). The shutters were automatically triggered when the wheel of a cart or the breast or legs of a horse tripped wires connected to an electromagnetic circuit. For a session on 15 June 1878, the press and a selection of turf men were invited to witness the process. An accident with a snapping strap was captured on the negatives and shown to the attendees, convincing even the most sceptical witnesses. The news of this success was reported worldwide.
- July 8: The Daily Alta California reported that Muybridge first exhibited magic lantern-projected slides of the sequential photographs at the San Francisco Art Association on 8 July 1878. Newspapers were not yet able to reproduce detailed photographs, so the images were widely printed as woodcut engravings. Scientific American was among the publications at the time that carried reports and engravings of Muybridge's groundbreaking images. Six different series were soon published as cabinet cards, entitled The Horse in Motion.
- Specific date unknown:
  - Charles-Émile Reynaud received an honourable mention at the 1878 Exposition Universelle for his praxinoscope. He started production on the device and was able to quit his teaching job after its financial success. The device was initially offered at Le Bon Marché stores.
  - Eadweard Muybridge published his first chronophotography pictures in 1878. These sequential pictures were soon mounted in zoetropes by several people (including Muybridge himself) and were also published as strips for the zoetrope in the 1880s.

== Births ==
=== May ===
- May 2: Roy Atwell, American actor, comedian, and composer (voice of Doc in Snow White and the Seven Dwarfs), (d. 1962).
- May 16: Taylor Holmes, American actor, (voice of King Stefan in Sleeping Beauty), (d. 1959).

== Sources ==
- Bendazzi, Giannalberto (1994). Cartoons: One hundred years of cinema animation. Indiana University Press. ISBN 0253209374.
- Myrent, Glenn (1989). "Emile Reynaud: First Motion Picture Cartoonist". Film History. 3 (3). Indiana University Press: 191–202. doi:10.2307/3814977. JSTOR 3814977.
- Thomas, Bob (1958). Walt Disney, the Art of Animation. Simon & Schuster.
