= Great Lever =

Coordinates: 53.562°N 2.428°W

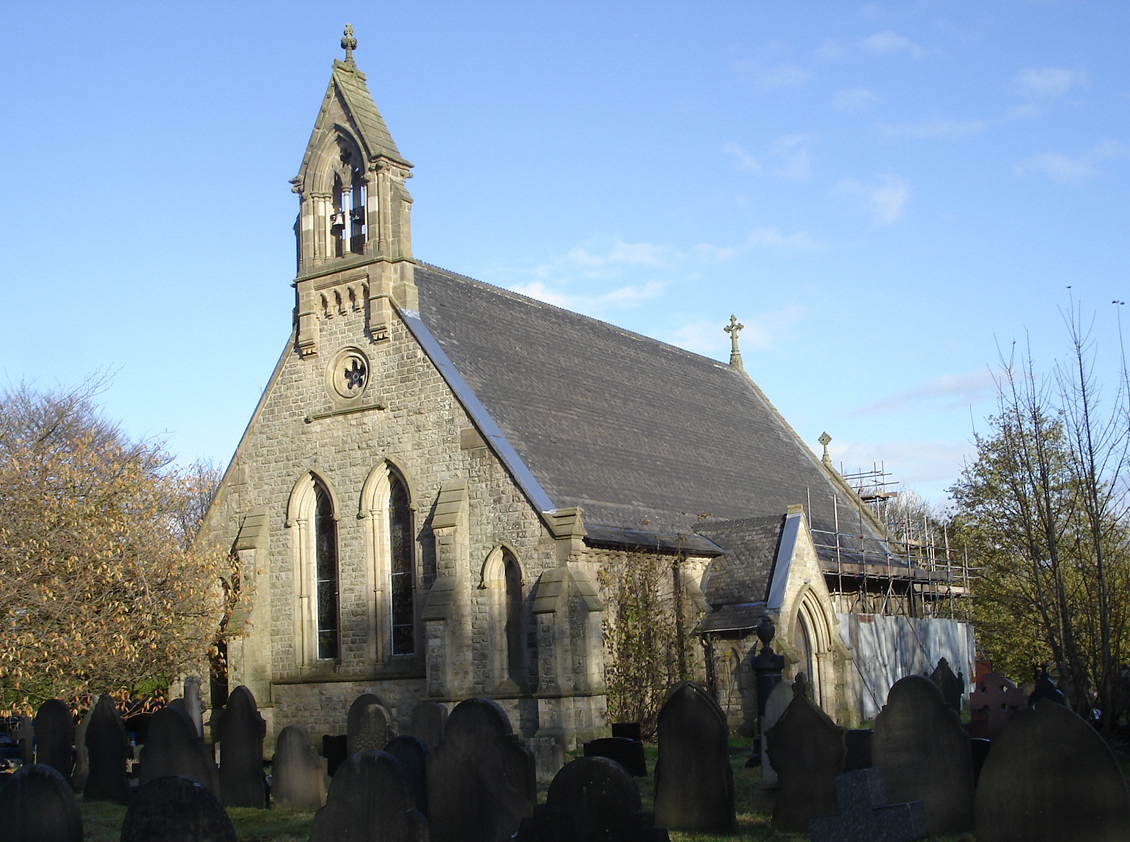
- Parish church of St Michael (with St Bartholomew)

- Location within Greater Manchester
- Population: 16,969 (2020.Ward)
- OS grid reference: SD717074
- Metropolitan borough: Bolton
- Metropolitan county: Greater Manchester
- Region: North West
- Country: England
- Sovereign state: United Kingdom
- Post town: BOLTON
- Postcode district: BL3
- Dialling code: 01204
- Police: Greater Manchester
- Fire: Greater Manchester
- Ambulance: North West
- UK Parliament: Bolton South and Walkden

Great Lever (/ˈleɪvə(r)/, LAY-ver) is a suburb of Bolton, Greater Manchester, England. Historically in Lancashire, it is 2 1/2 miles (4.0 km) south of Bolton town centre and the same distance north of Farnworth. The district is served by frequent buses running to Bolton town centre, Farnworth and the Royal Bolton Hospital. The population is 16,969.

== Religion ==
The parish church of St. Michael (with St Bartholomew) is a Grade II listed building.

== Landmarks ==
On Green Lane there is one large public house: Southfield's, a pub and restaurant and The Brooklyn (now a private school). Both were houses built for local mill owners.

Beehive Mill (now demolished) on Crescent Road.

On the opposite side of Green Lane from the park are the grounds of Bolton Cricket Club. The two conjoined Doe Hey Reservoirs are used for private fishing. Will Hill Brook, which drains into the Doe Hey Reservoirs, forms the southern boundary between Great Lever and Farnworth.

== Education ==
Primary schools in Great Lever include Bishop Bridgeman CE Primary School, Essa Primary School, Lever Edge Primary Academy, St Michael's CE Primary School, SS Simon and Jude CE Primary School and St William of York RC Primary School. There are also numerous play-centres for pre-school children.

The former public house, The Brooklyn is now the independent school Lord's College.

The main secondary school in the area is Essa Academy for pupils aged 11 to 16.

== People ==
Footballer Albert Shepherd played for Bolton Wanderers and Newcastle United. Former Manchester City striker Paul Moulden owned a chip shop in the area and ex-Bolton player Roy Greaves ran a pub called Monteraze here for many years. Ralph Gubbins, a forward with Bolton Wanderers, Tranmere Rovers and Hull City, lived in Great Lever during his time with Wanderers. Another resident was Wales and Bolton Wanderers striker Wyn Davies who also went on to represent both Manchester clubs.

The architect Charles Holden (1875–1960), known for many London Underground buildings, was born in Great Lever.

Band leader Jack Hylton was born Great Lever in 1892 as John Greenhalgh Hilton.

== Sport ==
The Great Lever football club was briefly prominent in the 1880s, at one point being considered one of the top two in the country.

== History ==
Great Lever was formerly a township and chapelry in the parish of Middleton, in 1866 Great Lever became a separate civil parish, on 30 September 1898 the parish was abolished and merged with Bolton. In 1891 the parish had a population of 5400.

== See also ==
- Darcy Lever
- Little Lever
