= WOQ =

Radio station Kansas City, Missouri (1922-1934)

WOQ was an American AM radio station in Kansas City, Missouri. First licensed on February 17, 1922, it was the first broadcasting station authorized in the state. WOQ was deleted in June 1934, after the Federal Radio Commission refused to renew its license.

== History ==
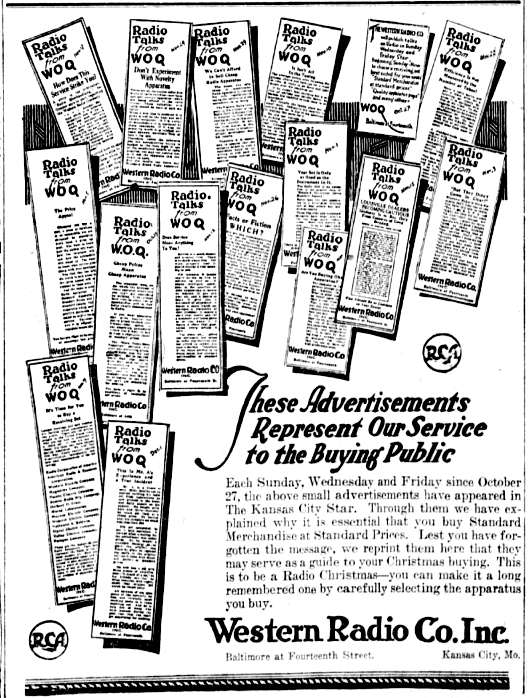
WOQ was founded in 1922 by the Western Radio Company.

The US Department of Commerce regulated radio stations in the United States from 1912 until the 1927 formation of the Federal Radio Commission (FRC). Originally there were no restrictions on which radio stations could make broadcasts intended for the general public. However, effective December 1, 1921, a regulation was adopted limiting broadcasting to stations operating under a Limited Commercial license that authorized operation on designated wavelengths of 360 meters (833 kHz) for "entertainment", and 485 meters (619 kHz) for "market and weather reports".

WOQ was first licensed on February 17, 1922, to the Western Radio Company, for operation on both wavelengths. The call sign was randomly issued from a list of available call letters. Currently most stations west of the Mississippi River have call letters beginning with "K". However, prior to the January 1923 establishment of the river as the boundary, call letters beginning with "W" were generally assigned to stations east of an irregular line formed by the western state borders from North Dakota south to Texas, with calls beginning with "K" going only to stations in states west of that line. Because there was only a single "entertainment" wavelength, WOQ was required to establish a time sharing agreement with any other local stations broadcasting on 360 meters.

In November 1924, the station was relicensed to the Unity School of Christianity, on 1080 kHz. In November 1927, WOQ was reassigned to 880 kHz. On November 11, 1928, with the implementation of the Federal Radio Commission' s General Order 40, the station was assigned to 610 kHz, sharing this frequency with the Kansas City Star station WDAF. A year later, the station received its final frequency assignment of 1300 kHz, now sharing the frequency with KFH in Wichita, Kansas, with WOQ assigned 2/7ths of the time.

In December 1931, WOQ's application for license renewal was denied, with the station ordered to shut down and cede its hours to timeshare partner KFH. Unity appealed this ruling, but ultimately the station was permanently shut down on June 14, 1934.

While the WOQ decision was being appealed, Unity applied for operation on 1530 kHz, one of three additional frequencies allocated by the FRC. However, this assignment went to a competing application by First National Television.

== See also ==
- List of initial AM-band station grants in the United States
