= 1884 in animation =

Events in 1884 in animation.

== Events ==
- March: Appointment of a commission by the University of Pennsylvania, including the university's professors William Pepper, Joseph Leidy, George Frederick Barker, Lewis M. Haupt and emeritus Harrison Allen, as well as Thomas Eakins and Edward Hornor Coates of the Pennsylvania Academy of the Fine Arts. They would work with the photographer Eadweard Muybridge in a scientific study focused on the analysis of animal and human movement. The project would eventually last more than three years, and costs rose to almost $30,000, but the university believed the unexpected amount of time and money to be well spent. The huge body of work was thought to be of everlasting importance to science and art and it would take years to examine all the material critically. The study was based on Muybridge's previous work on chronophotography and the zoöpraxiscope (animal action viewer).
- March 28: Opening of the amusement center Eden Musée in New York City. It featured a changing selection of specialty entertainment, including magic lantern shows and marionettes. The magic lantern was not only a direct ancestor of the motion picture projector as a means for visual storytelling, but it could itself be used to project moving images. Some suggestion of movement could be achieved by alternating between pictures of different phases of a motion, but most magic lantern "animations" used two glass slides projected together — one with the stationary part of the picture and the other with the part that could be set in motion by hand or by a simple mechanism.
- Since Spring 1884: From Spring 1884 to Autumn 1885, Eadweard Muybridge and his team produced over 100,000 images, mostly at an outdoor studio on the grounds of the University of Pennsylvania's northeast corner of 36th and Pine, recording the motions of animals from the veterinary hospital, and from humans: University professors, students, athletes, Blockley Almshouse patients, and local residents. Thomas Eakins worked with him briefly, although the painter preferred working with multiple exposures on a single negative, whereas Muybridge preferred capturing motion through the use of multiple cameras. Since 1879, Muybridge was working on the zoöpraxiscope (animal action viewer), a projection device that created cyclical animations of animal movement, incorporating technologies from photography, the magic lantern and the zoetrope. The photographer created painted sequences on the glass zoöpraxiscope discs that were based on his motion-study photographs to produce an early form of animation. Muybridge used these to illustrate his lectures that were presented to audiences in the U.S. and Europe, marking his contribution to photography and film in relation to the "experience of time within modernity."
- Specific date unknown: In 1884, the Scottish artist Helen Campbell D'Olier lectured on the subject of Christian illuminated manuscripts in Alexandra College, showing magic lantern-slides of her work in reproducing them.

== Births ==
=== May ===
- May 20: Leon Schlesinger, American film producer (Warner Bros. Cartoons), (d. 1949).

=== August ===
- August 1: Lajos Jámbor, Hungarian-American painter, illustrator, and background artist for animation (background artist for the Fleischer Studios, worked on the backgrounds of the animated feature film Gulliver's Travels), (d. 1954).

=== November ===
- November 19: Robert Collard, French writer, illustrator, novelist, painter, art critic, animator, and film director, (founder of his own animation studio, the Lortac workshop), (d. 1973).

== Sources ==
- Barrier, Michael (1999). Hollywood Cartoons: American Animation in Its Golden Age. Oxford: Oxford University Press. ISBN 0-19-516729-5.
