= Siegfried Böhmke =

German puppeteer

Siegfried Böhmke is a German puppeteer, who has been director of the Münchner Marionettentheater since 2000.
