= 1882 in animation =

Events in 1882 in animation.

== Events ==
- March 13: Eadweard Muybridge lectured at the Royal Institution in London in front of a sell-out audience, which included members of the Royal Family, notably the future king Edward VII. He displayed his photographs on screen and showed moving pictures projected by his zoopraxiscope.
- Specific date unknown:
  - In 1882, Ernest Meissonier displayed Eadweard Muybridge's The Horse in Motion by using a praxinoscope.
  - Leland Stanford commissioned the book The Horse in Motion: as shown by Instantaneous Photography with a Study on Animal Mechanics founded on Anatomy and the Revelatins of the Camera in which is demonstrated The Theory of Quadrupedal Locomotion, written by his friend and physician Jacob Davis Babcock Stillman; it was published by Osgood and Company. The book featured little true instantaneous photography; the majority of the 40 chronophotographic plates are rendered as black contours, and 29 plates contain line drawings of Eadweard Muybridge's photographic "foreshortenings" (views of the same instant from five different angles, much like what later became known as bullet time). Muybridge was not credited in the book, except when noted as a Stanford employee and in a technical appendix based on an account he had written. As a result, Britain's Royal Society of Arts, which earlier had offered to finance further photographic studies by Muybridge of animal movement, withdrew the funding. His suit against Stanford to gain credit was dismissed out of court.
  - Charles-Émile Reynaud first attempts to market his praxinoscope projection device, which he had completed in 1880. Only a handful of examples are known to still exist.
  - (Estimated year) - John Arthur Roebuck Rudge built a magic lantern for William Friese-Greene with a mechanism to project a sequence of seven photographic slides. The surviving slides show a man removing his head with his hands and raising the loose head. The photographed body belonged to Rudge and Friese-Greene posed for the head. The slides probably provided the very first trick photography sequence projection. Friese-Greene demonstrated the machine in his shop, until the police ordered him to remove it when it attracted too large a crowd.

== Births ==
=== April ===
- April 18: Leopold Stokowski, British-born American conductor (conductor in Fantasia), (d. 1977).

=== August ===
- August 8: Ladislas Starevich, Polish-Russian animator (The Beautiful Leukanida, The Night Before Christmas, Le Roman de Renard (The Tale of the Fox)), (d. 1965).
- August 17: Charles Judels, Dutch-American actor (voice of Stromboli and The Coachman in Pinocchio, Chicken Farmer in Porky's Garden), (d. 1969).

=== September ===
- September 19: Storm P., Danish comics artist, animator, illustrator, painter and comedian (Tre små mænd), (d. 1949).

== Sources ==
- Bendazzi, Giannalberto (1994). Cartoons: One hundred years of cinema animation. Indiana University Press. ISBN 0253209374.
- Mosley, Leonard (1985). Disney's World: A Biography. Stein and Day. ISBN 978-0-812-83073-6.
- Myrent, Glenn (1989). "Emile Reynaud: First Motion Picture Cartoonist". Film History. 3 (3). Indiana University Press: 191–202. doi:10.2307/3814977. JSTOR 3814977.
