= William Carr Crofts =

- Born: 1846; Bradford, West Yorkshire, England
- Died: 1894 (aged 47–48)
- Occupations: Architect, entrepreneur, photographic pioneer
- Known for: Co-founder of Liberty and Property Defence League; early motion picture experiments with Wordsworth Donisthorpe

William Carr Crofts (1846–1894) was an English architect and entrepreneur who was a photographic pioneer.

== History ==
Crofts was born in Bradford, West Yorkshire and became an architect. With his cousin, Wordsworth Donisthorpe, he was one of the founders of the Liberty and Property Defence League in 1882. In 1890 he and Donisthorpe were able to produce a moving picture of London's Trafalgar Square. In 1891 with Donisthorpe he was awarded a patent for a camera capable of producing instantaneous photographs. At the time Crofts was a gentleman living at Westminster Chambers, Victoria Street.

Crofts' brother, Ernest Crofts, was a rather successful painter. In fact, at circa 1888 one of Ernest Crofts' paintings titled "Marston Moor" had been exhibited at the Royal Academy of Art in London; it is speculated that the Ernest Crofts painting of the battle scene is what may have truly inspired Donisthorpe and W.C. Crofts to revamp their desires to create the first motion picture.

Since Crofts and Donisthorpe were staunch laissez faire supporters they were constantly at odds with the ever-rising socialist movement in England. Especially considering the political group Donisthrope and Crofts helped to found, they were always in political battles with the many socialist groups that were emerging all around them. In 1890, the riots at Trafalgar Square were fueled with socialist contempt over the government and their nemesis corporate England. Crofts and Donisthorpe wished to make their first recording on their newly patented "Kinesigraph" at the square. Considering Crofts and Donisthorpe's political positions and passions, it's reasonable to believe that they both were motivated to bring motion pictures to the world for if not entertainment value than most certainly for educational and political purposes. During Crofts and Donisthorpe's days with the "Liberty and Property Defense league" they used images from their latest photographic inventions to illustrate political points and images at these league meetings.
