= Liberty and Property Defence League =

Former British advocacy organisation

The Liberty and Property Defence League (LPDL) was a historic organisation, founded in 1882 by Lord Elcho, for the support of laissez-faire trade. It served as a lobby group for industrialists and land-owners who were alarmed by Georgism ("Single Tax"), trade unionism, socialism, and elements in the Gladstone administration, but attracted also many liberals and philosophical individualists.

The League continued to exist until the 1920s, but its president, Wemyss (Lord Elcho), resigned in 1913. This was after the individualism of Herbert Spencer declined, which was the main raison d'être of the League. The ideas of the organisation were carried on by the Society of Individualists of Sir Ernest Benn.

A weekly pamphlet put out by the League was called Jus: A Weekly Organ of Individualism, which was edited by individualist anarchist Wordsworth Donisthorpe.
