= 1880 in animation =

Events in 1880 in animation.

== Events ==
- June 4: Charles-Émile Reynaud presented a praxinoscope projection device at the Société française de photographie. He did not attempt to market his praxinoscope a projection before 1882. Only a handful of examples are known to still exist.
- Specific date unknown:
  - In 1880, Plastilin (or Plasteline) was patented in Germany by Franz Kolb. It was further developed by Claude Chavant in 1892 and trademarked in 1927. It is a form of modelling clay for use in building and sculpting. It is a precursor of plasticine, which would become the favourite product for clay animators, as it did not dry and harden (unlike normal clay) and was much more malleable than its harder and greasier Italian predecessor plasteline.
  - The Zoopraxiscope of Eadweard Muybridge was introduced in 1880 at the California School of Fine Arts. Muybridge did project moving images from his photographs with his Zoopraxiscope, from 1880 to 1895, but these were painted on discs and his technique was no more advanced than similar earlier demonstrations (for instance those by Franz von Uchatius in 1853). The first discs were painted on the glass in dark contours. Discs made between 1892 and 1894 had outlines drawn by Erwin Faber photographically printed on the disc and then colored by hand, but these discs were probably never used in Muybridge's lectures.

== Births ==
=== January ===
- January 12: F. Percy Smith, British naturalist and filmmaker, pioneer of time-lapse photography, microphotography, microcinematography, and stop-motion animation (To Demonstrate How Spiders Fly, Fight for the Dardanelles), (d. 1945).

=== April ===
- April 21: Tony Sarg, German-American puppeteer and illustrator (The First Circus, Tony Sarg's Almanac), (d. 1942).

=== May ===
- May 15: Antonio Rubino, Italian animation director, cartoonist, illustrator, playwright, and screenwriter, (directed the animated films Paese dei Ranocchi (The Land of the Frogs) and I sette colori (The Seven Colors), contributor to the Disney comics magazine Topolino which featured the character of Mickey Mouse), (d. 1964).

=== September ===
- September 14: Earl Hurd, American animator, film director and comics artist (Bobby Bumps, co-creator of the cel animation technique which he patented in 1914, worked for J.R. Bray, The Van Beuren Corporation, Terrytoons, Ub Iwerks and the Walt Disney Company), (d. 1940).

=== October ===
- October 19: Scotty Mattraw, American actor (voice of Bashful in Snow White and the Seven Dwarfs), (d. 1946).
- October 21: Viking Eggeling, Swedish avant-garde artist and filmmaker, pioneer of abstract animation (directed the animated short film Symphonie diagonale), (d. 1925).
