= Angel Espoy =

Spanish American painter (1879-1963)

- Born: Angel De Service Espoy; October 2, 1879; Villa Nueva, Spain
- Died: January 31, 1963 (aged 83); Seal Beach, California, U.S.
- Education: Joaquín Sorolla
- Known for: Marine art, Floral Landscape art, illustrator
- Notable work: California Wildflowers landscape
- Style: Realism
- Movement: Barbizon school
- Spouse: Concepcion Espey
- Children: 1

Angel De Service Espoy (October 2, 1879 - January 31, 1963) was a Spanish American painter. He was best known for his paintings of the California seascapes and landscapes of poppies and lupines. His landscapes and marine art were exhibited at the Los Angeles City Hall, Oakland Museum of California, Los Angeles Municipal Art Gallery and Loyola University. His style was influenced by the Barbizon school of painters.

== Early life ==
During his years at sea he became captain of a four-rigged vessel, which operated in the Asia.

== Professional life ==
=== Southern California ===
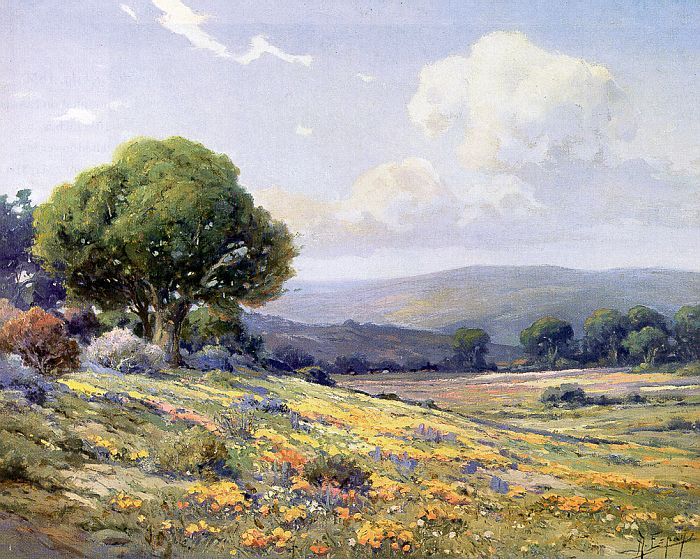
California Wildflowers oil on canvas landscape by Angel Espoy

The painting The Full Rigged Ship was exhibited at the Laguna Beach Art Gallery.

In March 1938, Espoy's California wildflower landscapes and marine art were exhibited at the Frances Webb Gallery in Los Angeles. His style was influenced by the Barbizon school of painters. In October 1938, he exhibited twelve oil paintings of landscapes and marine art, including California in Bloom and Poetic Monterey, at the Los Angeles Municipal Art Gallery.
