= Jack Hylton =

English pianist, composer, bandleader and impresario (1892–1965)

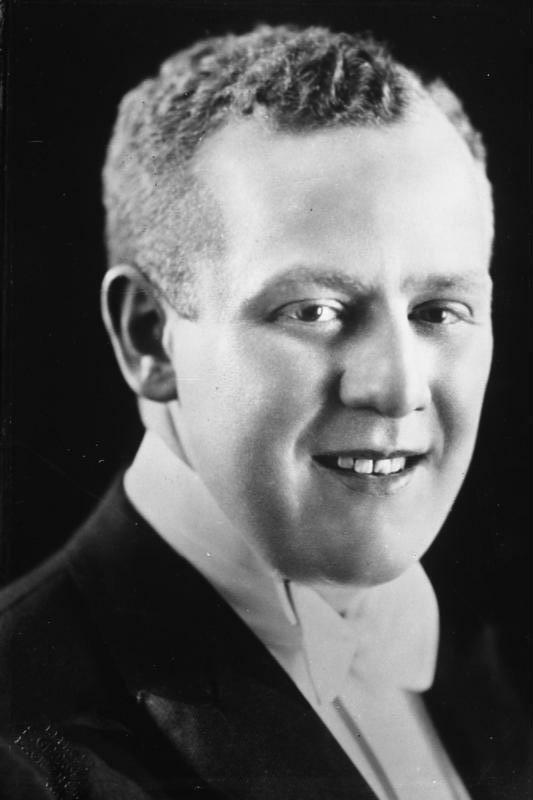
- Hylton c. mid-to-late 1920s

Background information
- Birth name: John Greenhalgh Hilton
- Also known as: Jack Elton
- Born: 2 July 1892; Great Lever, Lancashire, England
- Died: 29 January 1965 (aged 72); Marylebone, London, England
- Genres: Jazz
- Occupations: Pianist; Band leader; impresario; composer
- Instrument: Piano
- Years active: 1917–1965
- Labels: His Master's Voice

Jack Hylton (born John Greenhalgh Hilton; 2 July 1892 – 29 January 1965) was an English pianist, composer, band leader and impresario.

Hylton rose to prominence during the British dance band era, being referred as the "British King of Jazz" and "The Ambassador of British Dance Music" by the musical press, not only because of his popularity which extended throughout the world, but also for his use of unusually large ensembles for the time and his polished arrangements. He mostly retired from the music industry after 1940, becoming a successful theatrical businessman until his death.

== Early life and career ==
He was born John Greenhalgh Hilton in Great Lever near Bolton, Lancashire, the son of George Hilton, a cotton yarn twister. His father was an amateur singer at the local Labour Club and Hylton learned piano to accompany him on the stage. Hylton later sang to the customers when his father bought a pub (The Round Croft) in nearby Little Lever, becoming known as the "Singing Mill-Boy". He also performed as a relief pianist for various bands. In 1905 he joined a pierrot troupe in Rhyl and he went on to conduct the orchestra of a touring pantomime.

In 1913 he moved to London where he initially worked as an organist at a cinema in Stoke Newington. A year later he was working as a pianist in the 400 Club and playing with the Stroud Haxton Band. During the First World War he moved to be a musical director of the band of the 20th Hussars, and later in the Army Entertainment Division (N.A.C.B.).

After the First World War, Hylton formed a double act with Tommy Handley to little success, also collaborating in a number of short-lived stage shows. In 1919 he moved to Blackpool, where he composed and sold songs to tourists. He returned to London, playing with the "Queens" Dance Orchestra, wrote arrangements of popular songs and recorded them for the His Master's Voice and Zonophone under the label "Directed by Jack Hylton" (being credited in lieu of a pay rise), his records carrying the new style of jazz-derived American dance music.

== 1920s and 1930s ==
After being dismissed by his own bandmates from the Queen's Hall in 1922, Hylton not only set up his own band, but also set up a number of other orchestras under the Jack Hylton Organisation. Even though he was not professionally trained for business, he brought his band to success even at a time when the Great Depression hit hard during the 1930s. His good reputation allowed him to make contacts with famous jazz artists of the time, and he was credited for bringing Duke Ellington, Louis Armstrong and others to Britain and Europe in the 1930s.

An ensemble consisting at times of more than 20 musicians, the Hylton orchestra quickly stood out from the rest. Unlike many other bandleaders who took up residences at nightclubs and ballrooms, Hylton often embarked on lengthy tours of England, which ultimately moulded the concept most Britons had of jazz.

By the mid-1920s, he was usually referred as the "British King of Jazz", a notion Hylton initially dismissed. As late as 1926, he thought of jazz as "a bunch of noises" popular at the end of the First World War, "when everything was topsy-turvy". Hylton first appeared on radio through station 2LO in 1924, and on 24 June 1925, he cut the His Master's Voice's first electric record, "Feelin' Kind O' Blue", at Hayes in Middlesex.

The second half of the 1920s marked Hylton's highest point of prominence. After recovering from a near-fatal car accident – which took place on 20 January 1927, on way to the Gramophone Company studios in Hayes, Middlesex – he made the first in a string of "continental tours" that lasted until 1930. The orchestra's line-up also included some of the most skilled musicians of the time. "Regular" players included saxophonists Billy Ternent (who was also the band's main arranger and co-leader), Edward Owen (E.O.) "Poggy" Pogson and Noel "Chappie" d'Amato, trumpeter/cornetist Jack Jackson, trombonist Lew Davis, violinists Hugo Rignold and Harry Berly, pianist/arranger Peter Yorke, and (from 1928) singer Sam Browne. The orchestra was often augmented with members of other Hylton-controlled bands, especially for 12-inch "concert arrangements". According to the Daily Herald of 7 June 1930, between four and five million records sold in 1929 (out of 50 million sold overall) were made by Hylton, although three million has been suggested as likely a more accurate figure.

By the time the Depression started biting in 1930, Hylton downsized his band and began performing in Europe less frequently; that same year, however, Maurice Chevalier recorded with Hylton, who also made the first recording of "Body and Soul", and Pat O'Malley replaced Browne as vocalist. In 1930, they recorded "Amy, Wonderful Amy", a song about Amy Johnson. Hylton also became a director and major shareholder of the new Decca record label, switching from His Master's Voice in late 1931. The following year, he was decorated by the French government, recorded with Paul Robeson, and made the first transatlantic entertainment broadcast with Paul Whiteman and his orchestra.

In late 1933, Hylton left Decca after refusing to take a pay cut, not making records until 1935 when he rejoined His Master's Voice. He spent 1934 touring Europe again, and adopted "The Soldiers in the Park" (more commonly known as "Oh Listen to the Band") as his signature tune. In 1935, he appeared in his first feature film, the musical comedy She Shall Have Music, which starred June Clyde and Claude Dampier.

That same year, Hylton finally was able to perform in the United States; he had repeatedly attempted this for almost a decade, but had been opposed by the musicians' unions (a 1929 tour was cancelled at the last minute). Standard Oil signed Hylton for a radio show on CBS, not only paying him and his star players, but also paying all expenses for those band members unable to play in the US. Whilst in Chicago, Hylton made a number of records with his radio band for Victor. Union pressure led him to return to the UK in 1936, although Pat O'Malley and Alec Templeton stayed in America, making a name for themselves.

Upon returning to Britain, he was criticised for adopting the then-popular swing rhythm, so he kept playing in his well-established style, including a series of new "concert recordings". After a new tour of Europe in 1937, which included a month-long run of performances at Berlin's Scala Theatre in Nazi Germany, Hylton began appearing on radio more frequently, starring in Radio Luxembourg's Rinso Radio Revue until 1939, when he appeared in the BBC's Band Waggon, as well as its 1940 film adaptation. Hylton and his band also made a number of appearances on BBC television in the 1930s, on one of which Ernie Wise made his television debut.

== 1940s and 1950s ==
The Jack Hylton orchestra disbanded in 1940 as many of its members were called up for service, although Jack continued to conduct orchestras for radio in the years to come, leading the Glenn Miller Orchestra when it visited England in 1943. During the war, he took the London Philharmonic Orchestra around Britain, giving promenade concerts. This helped to keep the orchestra going when its normal programme had ceased and it was on the edge of bankruptcy.

At this point in his career he became an impresario, discovering new stars and managing radio, film and theatre productions, from ballets to circuses. His productions dominated the London theatres with such productions as The Merry Widow, Kiss Me, Kate, and Kismet.

In 1950 he reunited with a number of his former employees, many of whom had become successful in their own right, for that year's Royal Command Performance, billed as "The Band that Jack Built". Despite their success, Hylton resisted calls for his return to band-leading. There were rumours in 1954 that he would stand for Parliament from Bolton, where he was a prominent member of the local Labour Party branch.

In November 1955, he was contracted as Advisor of Light Entertainment to Associated-Rediffusion (A-R), winner of the London weekday franchise in the recently established ITV network. He founded Jack Hylton Television Productions, Ltd. in that same month to produce a range of light entertainment programming exclusively for A-R. In 1957 and 1958, A-R and Jack Hylton Productions made a half-hour series called "Jack Hylton's Monday Show". Although popular, the companies' productions were of low quality, with performers even apologising in front of millions of viewers at times. This in turn helped establish ITV's reputation for coarseness, a stigma it would only shake off by the 1970s. Hylton refused to renew his ITV contract in 1959; the last shows made by the company were broadcast in 1960.

== 1960s ==
In his final years Hylton was still producing stage shows, as well as taking a leading role in organising various Royal Command Performances, until his final stage production, Camelot, in 1965.

In 1965 a televised tribute to Hylton, The Stars Shine for Jack, was held in London on Sunday 30 May at the Theatre Royal, Drury Lane with many artists including Arthur Askey, the Crazy Gang, Marlene Dietrich, Dickie Henderson and Shirley Bassey.

== Personal life ==
Hylton was married twice; firstly in 1913 in St Asaph, Flintshire, Wales, to bandleader Ennis Parkes (born Florence Parkinson), whom he had met during his pierrot work. They separated in 1929, but remained relatively close until Parkes's death in 1957, despite the formation of a short-lived "Mrs. Jack Hylton Band" in the mid-1930s. During the 1930s he had a long affair with model Frederika Kogler ("Fifi"), with whom he had two daughters: Jackie (b. 1932) and Georgina (b. 1938). He also had a son, Jack (b. 1947) by a later affair with the singer and actress Pat Taylor and a daughter, Angela (b. 1965) by an affair with Rosalina Neri.

He secondly married in Geneva in 1963, to Australian model and beauty queen Beverley Prowse (1932–2000).

Hylton was decorated by the French government on two occasions for his contribution to the entertainment industry.

== Death ==
On 26 January 1965, complaining of chest and stomach pains, Hylton was admitted to the London Clinic. He died there three days later, from a heart attack, aged 72. Hylton's spending habits and generosity left his estate with £242,288. Hylton said to his son during his latter years, "I won't leave you much, but we'll have a good laugh spending it while I'm here!" However, this equates to £4.6 million in 2018, when adjusted for inflation.

He is buried in the churchyard of St Catherine at Gosfield, Essex. His wife Beverley is buried beside him.

== Legacy ==
Specialist dance band radio stations, such as Radio Dismuke and Swing Street Radio, continue to play his records. Hylton also features regularly on the Manx Radio programme Sweet & Swing, presented by Howard Caine.

His 1930 recording of "Happy Days Are Here Again" was used during the closing credits of episode four of Ken Burns's documentary series "The Roosevelts".

Hylton is portrayed by Ted Robbins in the 2011 television film Eric and Ernie.
