= Münchner Marionettentheater =

Theatre in Munich, Germany

Coordinates: 48°07′55″N 11°34′13″E

Münchner Marionettentheater is a theatre in Munich, Bavaria, Germany. It is known as the oldest, not-mobil puppetry in the German-speaking countries. It is chaired by puppeteer Siegfried Böhmke since 2000.
