= Ovaltiney's Concert Party =

British radio show

Ovaltiney's Concert Party was a weekly British radio show that ran on Radio Luxembourg between December 1934 and September 1939 and was sponsored by the manufacturer of Ovaltine. A new version of the show aired in 1952.

== Concept ==
Ovaltiney's Concert Party featured British music hall comedian Harry Hemsley doing a variation on his popular stage show act, where he would imitate children's voices. The radio show was a combination of comedy sketches and music. Hemsley portrayed the family Fortune and played all parts himself, including the father, six-year old Johnny, five-year old Elsie, four-year old Winnie and six-months old Horace. Winnie was often portrayed as the cleverest child and an interpreter for baby Horace's gargling. This led to the familiar catchphrase: "What did Horace say, Winnie?", which became part of English popular culture.

The show was broadcast on Sunday evenings between 17:30 and 18:00 over the powerful longwave transmitter. It became well known throughout the UK for its theme song "We Are The Ovaltineys", which was written and composed by Hemsley himself. The musical director was the bandleader Debroy Somers.

== Fanclub ==
People could become members of the Ovaltineys Club and participate in competitions and other activities. It achieved five million members in 1939.

== Comic strip adaptation ==
In 1936, a special children's magazine Ovaltiney's Own Comic was founded, based on the radio show. It featured a text comic; The Adventures of Elsie, Winnie and Johnny, drawn by S.K. Perkins. Harry Hemsley, who was once a cartoonist for Ally Sloper's Half Holiday, also wrote drew some picture books about the family.

== Revivals ==
In 1952, a new version of the Ovaltineys' radio show was aired at 18:15 on Sunday evenings over Radio Luxembourg on its new "208" medium wave transmitter. The radio theme song We Are The Ovaltineys also experienced a comeback in 1975 when it was used by Ovaltine in a TV advertisement and released as a single record.
