= Harry Hemsley =

Harry May Hemsley (14 December 1877 – 5 April 1951) was an English music hall and radio comedian. He is best known as the host of the popular radio show Ovaltiney's Concert Party on Radio Luxembourg. He was also active as a cartoonist.

== Youth ==
Harry Hemsley was born in 1877 in Swindon, Wiltshire, England. He started acting at age eight, when his father, a scenic artist, had him perform on stage. In the 1890s, he was a cartoonist for the British comics magazine Ally Sloper's Half Holiday. He performed as bass-baritone singer in the minstrel show White Coons. In 1905, Hemsley started acting in the music hall stage show The Follies with his familiar act of impersonating children's voices. He did this by covering his mouth with a book, newspaper or just his hand to signal a transition. His imitations were so spot-on that later, when he went on radio, many listeners were fooled. He also did celebrity voice impressions, among them of actor Wilson Barrett.

== Radio ==
In December 1934, Hemsley presented the weekly radio show Ovaltiney's Concert Party on Radio Luxembourg, a show which ran until the outbreak of World War II in September 1939. The show featured Hemsley in a series of sketches where he impersonated "his" four children Johnny, Elsie, Winnie and baby Horace, in varying falsetto voices in comic dialogues with Hemsley as "daddy". The fourth child, the baby Horace, was perpetually unintelligible, and had to be interpreted by his elder sister Winnie. This led to Hemsley's familiar catchphrase: "What did Horace say, ...?" The fictional family featured on Ovaltiney's Concert Party on Radio Luxembourg from 1934 to 1939.

The show was so popular at the time that it spawned a comic magazine, in which comics based on the radio characters were drawn by Harry Hemsley and S. K. Perkins. In 1940, Hemsley also made an animated commercial with his characters.

== Later career ==
After World War II, Hemsley made other radio shows like Old Hearty (1947) and Hemsley's Hotel (1949). He lived long enough to appear on early television.

== Death ==
He died in April 1951, at the age of 73.
