= Wordsworth Donisthorpe =

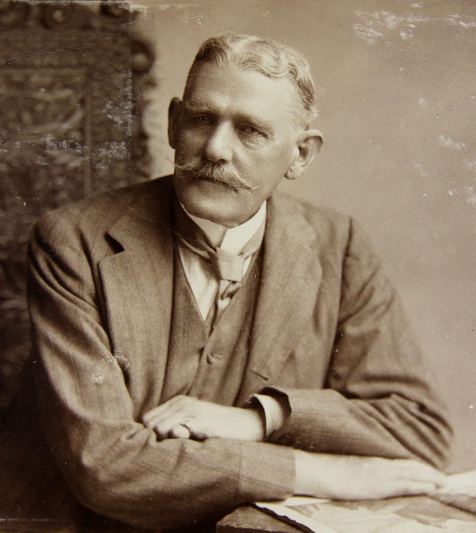
- Born: 24 March 1847; Leeds, England
- Died: 30 January 1914 (aged 66); Shottermill, Surrey, England
- Occupations: Barrister, political activist, inventor, photographer
- Spouses: Ann Maria Anderson (m. 1873, divorced): Edith Georgina Fleming
- Children: De Aula Donisthorpe died in South Africa. Edmund Donisthorpe died in South Africa Ethel Donisthorpe Died in Australia Frank Donisthorpe Died in England Edith Donisthorpe.

Donisthorpe filmed London's Trafalgar Square traffic in 1890; these are the surviving 10 frames

Wordsworth Donisthorpe (24 March 1847 – 30 January 1914) was an English barrister, individualist anarchist and inventor, pioneer of cinematography and chess enthusiast.

== Life and work ==
Donisthorpe was born in Leeds, on 24 March 1847. His father was George E. Donisthorpe, also an inventor; his brother, Horace Donisthorpe, was a myrmecologist. He studied at Leeds Grammar School and Trinity College, Cambridge. Donisthorpe married Ann Maria Anderson on 17 December 1873; whom he had four children. He and his wife later separated and he had a daughter with Edith Georgina Fleming (whom he described as his second wife) in 1911.

In 1885, Donisthorpe was co-founder of the British Chess Association and the British Chess Club.

He was an avid explorer and traveled throughout Northern Africa with Newnes, the publisher. He wrote a book, 'Down the Streams of Civilization,' and many papers.

Donisthorpe spoke on anarchism at a conference organised by the Fabian Society in 1886. He was associated with the Liberty and Property Defence League and edited their Jus journal until his split from the League in 1888.

In 1876, Donisthorpe filed for a film camera patent that he named a "kinesigraph". The object of the invention was to:

facilitate the taking of a succession of photographic pictures at equal intervals of time, in order to record the changes taking place in or the movement of the object being photographed, and also by means of a succession of pictures so taken of any moving object to give to the eye a presentation of the object in continuous movement as it appeared when being photographed.

According to Donisthorpe, he produced a model of this camera around the late 1870s. In 1890 he also produced, together with his cousin W. C. Crofts, a moving picture of London's Trafalgar Square. The camera that produced this moving picture was patented in 1889 along with the projector necessary to show the motion frames.

In 1893, Donisthorpe was one of the founding members and President of the children's rights and free love advocacy organisation the Legitimation League; he left the organization in 1897.

In his last book Uropa (1913), he proposed a philosophical language derived from Latin roots. An example is the phrase Karla avyrie ma glacyrusam, "Charles has given me a refrigerator".

On 30 January 1914, Donisthorpe died of heart failure at Shottermill, Surrey.

== Selected works ==
- Principles of Plutology. London: Williams & Norgate. 1876.
- The claims of labour, or, Serfdom, Wagedom, and Freedom. London: Samuel Tinsley & Co. 1880.
- Empire and Liberty, a Lecture on the Principles of Local Government. London: Liberty and Property Defence League. 1886.
- Labour capitalization. London: G. Harmsworth & Co. 1887.
- Individualism, a System of Politics. London: Macmillan. 1889.
- "The Woes of an Anarchist". Liberty. 1890.
- "L'État Est Mort; Vive L'État!". Liberty. 1890.
- Love and Law: An Essay on Marriage. London: W. Reeves. 1893.
- Law in a Free State. London: Macmillan. 1895.
- Down the stream of civilization. London: George Newnes. 1898.
