= Giannalberto Bendazzi =

Italian historian (1946–2021)

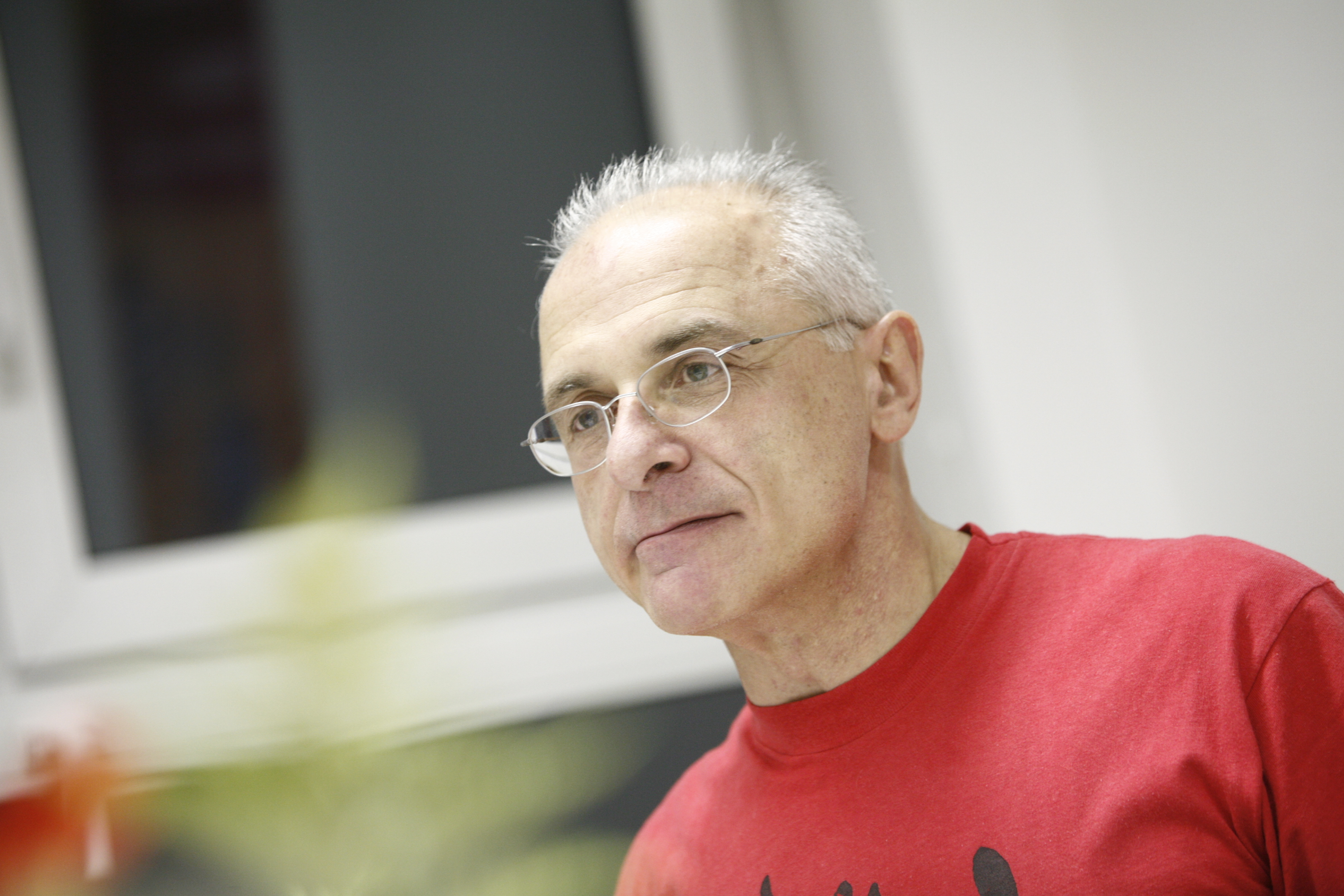
- Born: 17 July 1946; Ravenna, Italy
- Died: 13 December 2021 (aged 75)
- Notable work: Cartoons − 100 Years of Cinema Animation
- Awards: Award for Outstanding Achievement in Animation Theory
- Website: giannalbertobendazzi.com

Giannalberto Bendazzi (17 July 1946 – 13 December 2021) was an Italian animation historian, author, and professor.

== Life and career ==
Born in Ravenna, Italy, and raised in Milan, Bendazzi started his career as a journalist and at the same time a self-funded scholar. He turned to full-time academic teaching by 2002. Bendazzi has lectured on several continents, and particularly in Italy. In 2002 he first received the Award for Outstanding Achievement in Animation Theory from the Animafest Zagreb. In 2016 Asifa (Association internationale du Film d'animation) granted him the Life Achievement Award. In 2019, he received an Honorary Doctorate from Universidade Lusófona. He died on 13 December 2021, at the age of 75.

== Works ==
Bendazzi authored or edited many books and articles. He is probably best known for his book Cartoons − 100 Years of Cinema Animation, a history of the medium, published in Italian, English, French, Spanish and Persian. This book has been considered the definitive work on the subject for animation students and scholars.

In 2016, the three-tome Animation - A World History was published by CRC Press (Italian version Animazione - una storia globale, Milan, Utet, 2017). Bendazzi also edited Alexeieff – Itinéraire d’un maître / Itinerary of a Master (2001, in English and French, about the well-known author of avant-garde short films), and Quirino Cristiani, pionero del cine de animación (2008, in Spanish, about the author of the first animated feature-length films (English version Twice the First - Quirino Cristiani and the Animated Feature Film, CRC Press).

Bendazzi also wrote books on live-action cinema, on Woody Allen and Mel Brooks.

== Publications ==
- Animation - A World History, CRC Press, Boca Raton, Florida, USA, 2016 and 2017.
- Twice the First - Quirino Cristiani and the Animated Feature Film, CRC Press, Boca Raton, Florida, USA, 2017.
- (ed. with Marco Bellano) "Animation Journal" 2017, Vol. 25, Special Issue on Italian Animation. Santa Clarita, CA, USA, 2017.
- Quirino Cristiani, pionero del cine de animación, Ediciones de la Flor, Buenos Aires, 2008.
- L'uomo che anticipò Disney, Tunué, Latina, 2007.
- (ed.) Il cinema d'animazione e la nuova critica, Cuem, Milan, 2006.
- (ed.) Animazione e realismo, by Midhat Ajanovic, Cuem, Milan, 2005.
- Lezioni sul cinema d’animazione, Cuem, Milan, 2004, 2005.
- (booklet) Alexandre Alexeieff – Poemes de llum i ombra / Poemas de luz y sombra / Poems of Light and Shadow, Sitges 03, Festival Internacional de Cinema de Catalunya, Barcelona, 2003.
- (ed.) La fabbrica dell’animazione. Bruno Bozzetto nell'industria culturale italiana, Il Castoro, Milan, 2003.
- (booklet) I continenti dell’animazione, Cuem, Milan, 2002, 2003.
- (ed.) Alexeieff - Itinéraire d’un maître / Itinerary of a Master, Dreamland, Paris, 2001.
- (booklet) Le tour de l’animation en 84 films – Joyaux d’un siècle / The Tour of Animation in 84 Films – Jewels of a Century, Festival International du Film d’Animation, Annecy, 2000.
- Bruno Bozzetto – Animazione Primo amore, Isca, Milan, 1972. Croatian/English edition, Zagreb Animation Festival, 1998.
- (ed.) Coloriture – Voci, rumori, musiche nel cinema d’animazione, Pendragon, Bologna, 1995.
- (ed.) Il movimento creato – Studi e documenti di ventisei saggisti sul cinema d’animazione, Pluriverso, Turin, 1993.
- Cartoons – Cento anni di cinema d’animazione / Cartoons: One Hundred Years of Cinema Animation, Italian edition: Marsilio, Venice, 1988, 1992. French edition: Liana Lévi, Paris, 1992. English edition: John Libbey/Indiana University Press, London/Bloomington, 1994, 1995, 1999, 2003. Spanish edition: Ocho y Medio, Madrid, 2003. Persian edition:Yeksad Sal Cinemaye Animation, Tehran, 2007.
- Le cinéma d’animation, La Pensée Sauvage, Grenoble, 1985.
- (booklet) La zuzzurellinea – Osvaldo Cavandoli e l’animazione, Incontri Internazionali con gli Autori di Cinema d’Animazione, Genoa, 1985.
- Woody Allen − Il comico piú intelligente e l’intelligenza piú comica, Fabbri (later RCS), Milan, 1984, 1987, 1989, 1991, 1995. French edition: Liana Levi, Paris, 1986, 1989, 1991. English edition: Ravette, London, 1987. German edition: Treves, Trier, 1990, 1998. Hungarian edition: Alexandra Kiado, Budapest, 1994. Spanish edition: Orbis, Barcelona, 1995.
- (ed., booklet) Pages d’Alexeieff, AAA, Annecy, 1983. Italian edition: Incontri Internazionali con gli Autori di Cinema d’Animazione, Genoa, 1984.
- Due volte l’oceano – Vita di Quirino Cristiani, pioniere del cinema d’animazione, La casa Usher, Florence, 1983.
- (booklet) Appeso a una matita – Il cinema d’animazione di Guido Manuli, Incontri Internazionali con gli Autori di Cinema d’Animazione, Genoa, 1983.
- Mel Brooks – L’ultima follia di Hollywood, Il Formichiere, Milan, 1977. French edition: Glénat, Paris, 1980.
- Topolino e poi, Il Formichiere, Milan, 1978.
- Woody Allen, La Nuova Italia, Florence, 1976 and 1979.
- La Freccia Azzurra (The Blue Arrow), article for AWN, 1997.
- History of Portuguese Animation Cinema, article for AWN, 2002.
- A Letter To A Master - (Italian) "Lettera A Un Maestro", posthumous letter to Giorgio "Max" Massimino-Garniér, article for AWN, 2000.
- Icelandic Animation, article for AWN, 1996.
- Il Paese degli animali (Animaland), article for AWN, 1997.
