= Zoopraxiscope =

Early motion picture device

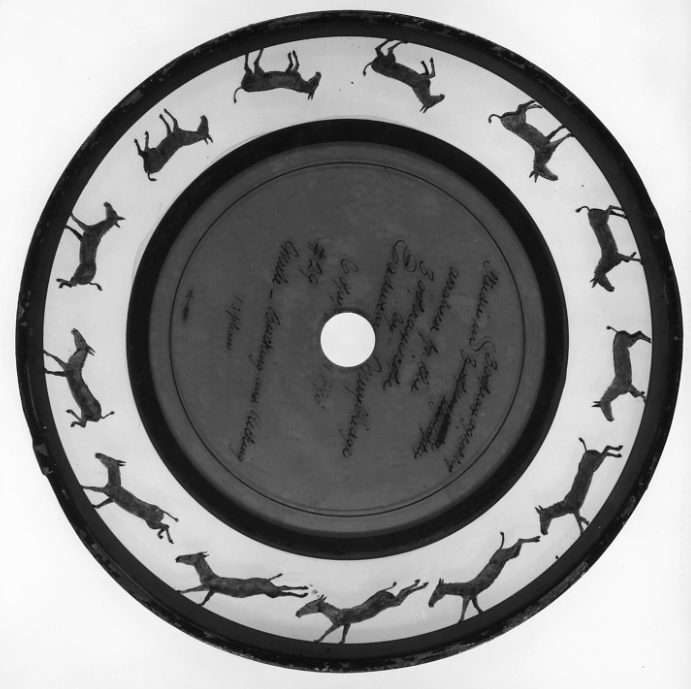
Black-and-white picture of a coloured zoopraxiscope disc, circa 1893 by Eadweard Muybridge and Erwin F. Faber

Black-and-white animation of a colored zoopraxiscope (without distortion, hence the elongated form)

The zoopraxiscope (initially named zoographiscope and zoogyroscope) is an early device for displaying moving images and is considered an important predecessor of the movie projector. It was conceived by photographic pioneer Eadweard Muybridge in 1879, and built for him by January 1880 to project his famous chronophotographic pictures in motion, thus proving that these were authentic. Muybridge used the projector in his public lectures from 1880 to 1895. The projector used 16" glass disks onto which Muybridge had an unidentified artist paint the sequences as silhouettes. This technique eliminated the backgrounds and enabled the creation of fanciful combinations and additional imaginary elements. Only one disk used photographic images, of a horse skeleton posed in different positions. A later series of 12″ discs, made in 1892–1894, used outlines drawn by Erwin F. Faber that were printed onto the discs photographically, then colored by hand. These colored discs were probably never used in Muybridge's lectures. All images of the known 71 disks, including those of the photographic disk, were rendered in elongated form to compensate the distortion of the projection. The projector was related to other projecting phenakistiscopes and used some slotted metal shutter discs that were interchangeable for different picture disks or different effects on the screen. The machine was hand-cranked.

The device appears to have been one of the primary inspirations for Thomas Edison and William Kennedy Dickson's Kinetoscope, the first commercial film exhibition system. Images from all of the known seventy-one surviving zoopraxiscope discs have been reproduced in the book Eadweard Muybridge: The Kingston Museum Bequest (The Projection Box, 2004).

...it is the first apparatus ever used, or constructed, for synthetically demonstrating movements analytically photographed from life, and in its resulting effects is the prototype of all the various instruments which, under a variety of names, are used for a similar purpose at the present day.

— Eadweard Muybridge, Animals in Motion (1899)

As stipulated in Muybridge's will, the original machine and disks in his possession were left to Kingston upon Thames, where they are still kept in the Kingston Museum Muybridge Bequest Collection (except for four discs that are in other collections, including those of the Cinémathèque Française and the National Technical Museum in Prague).

Muybridge also produced a series of 50 different paper 'zoopraxiscope discs' (essentially phenakistiscopes), again with pictures drawn by Erwin F. Faber. The discs were intended for sale at the 1893 World's Columbian Exposition in Chicago, but seem to have sold very poorly and are quite rare. The discs were printed in black-and-white, with twelve different discs also produced as chromolithographed versions. Of the coloured versions, only four different ones are known to still exist (with a total of five or six extant copies).

== See also ==
- History of cinema
- List of film formats
- Strobe light
