= Alister Clark Memorial Rose Garden =

Rose garden in Bulla, Victoria, Australia

Coordinates: 37°38′12″S 144°48′14″E

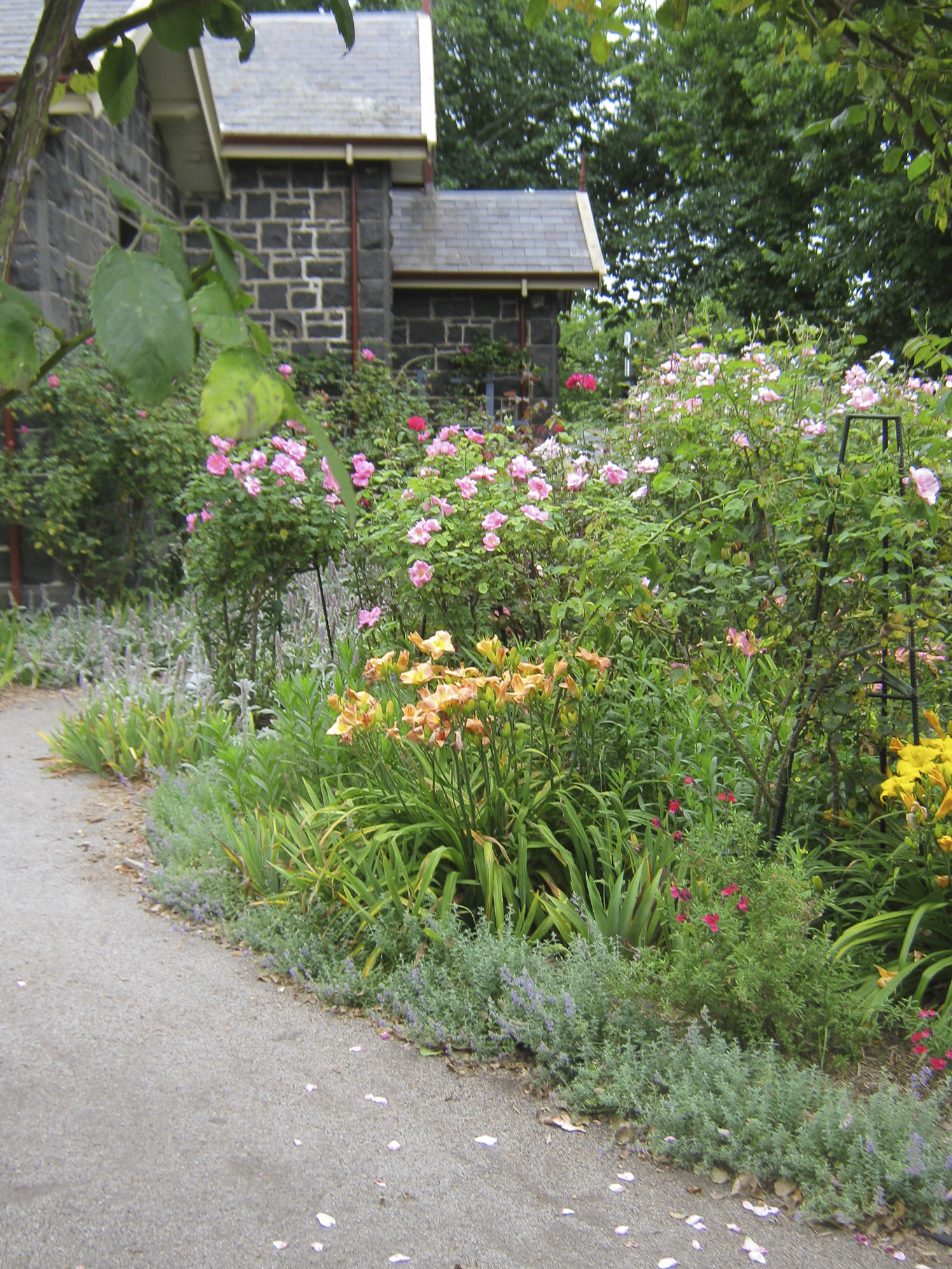
The path to the old shire hall and the front gate. The roses in the middle distance are 'Kitty Kininmonth' and 'Amy Johnson'.

The Alister Clark Memorial Rose Garden is the most complete collection in Australia of the surviving roses of "the great Australian rose breeder, Alister Clark" (1864–1949). It is situated near "Glenara", his old house and garden in Bulla, Victoria, 10 km NW of Melbourne Airport. There are at least 150 named roses by Alister Clark and many more plausibly attributed to him. Of these 83 are known to survive, though the authenticity of some is disputed and another eight only survive outside Australia.

The garden is maintained by volunteers coordinated by the Hume City Council.

== Roses in the garden ==
Below is an illustrated list of surviving Alister Clark roses in the Memorial Garden. Several related roses are also grown there. The list has been compiled from the brochure Alister Clark Memorial Garden of Hume City Council; and the online list established by Help Me Find Roses for Clark, Alister. Biographical detail comes from the Govanstones' The Women Behind the Roses. Further detail is from Susan Irvine's A Hillside of Roses. Roses putatively named after racehorses have been checked against the Pedigree Online Thoroughbred Database.

'Baxter Beauty' is the sport of an Alister Clark rose, not an Alister Clark rose itself. Nor is Rosa gigangtea, a species rose he frequently bred from. "Glenara No. 14", "Madge Taylor" and "Not Tonner's Fancy" (not shown) were found in his garden at "Glenara" and may be Clark roses. 'Broadway' was found at Mrs Oswin's in Broadway, Camberwell, Victoria and is probably a Clark Hybrid Gigantea. Clark's Hybrid Giganteas are often once flowering, but for a long period. They tend to be at their best in the Memorial Garden at Christmas, though 'Courier', 'Tonner's Fancy' and 'Pennant' are better in early Spring.

Nearly all the photos below were taken in the Alister Clark Memorial Rose Garden.

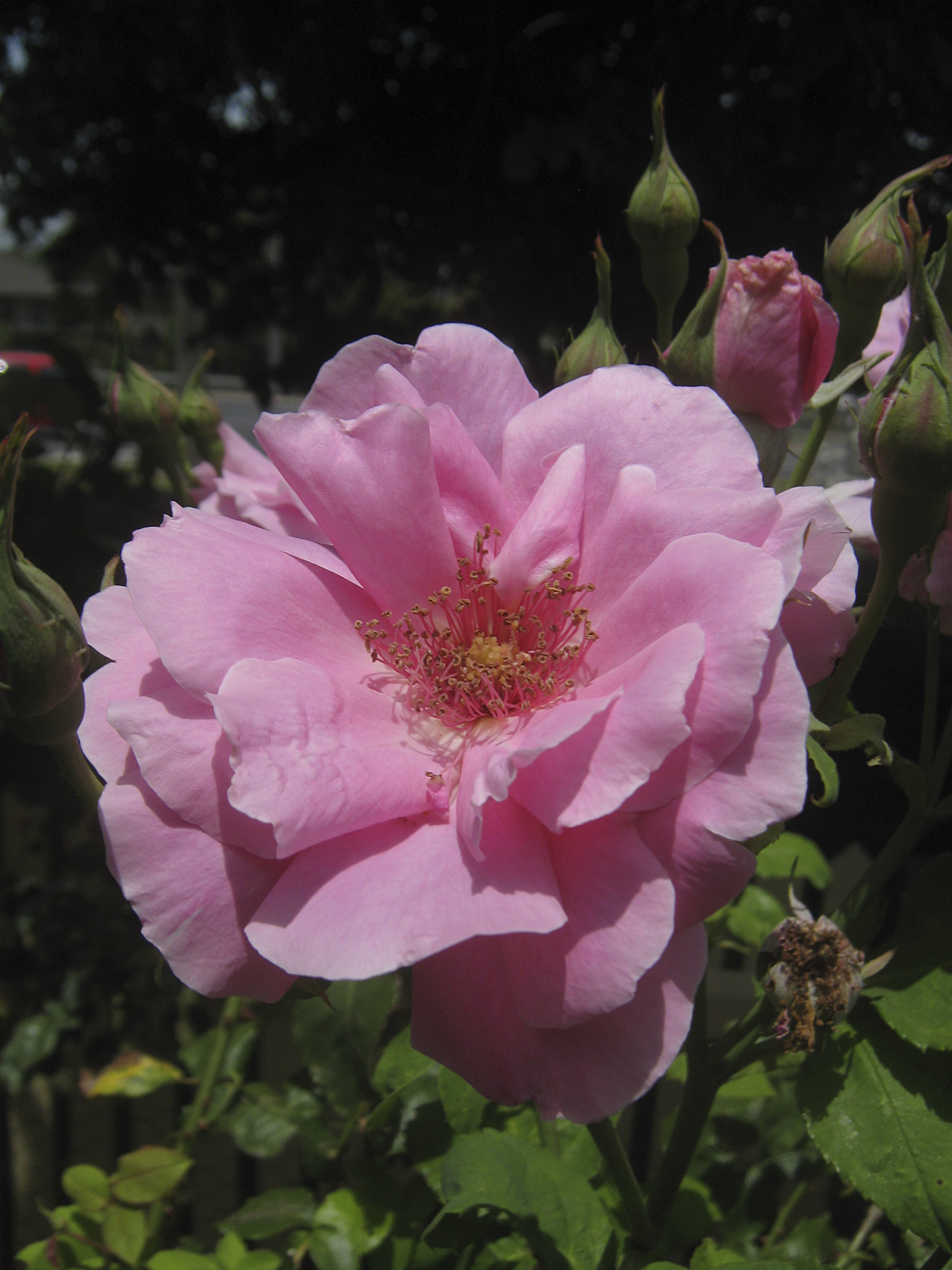
Amy Johnson, 1931, Hybrid Tea. Named after the aviation pioneer who had made the first one-woman flight from England to Australia the year before.

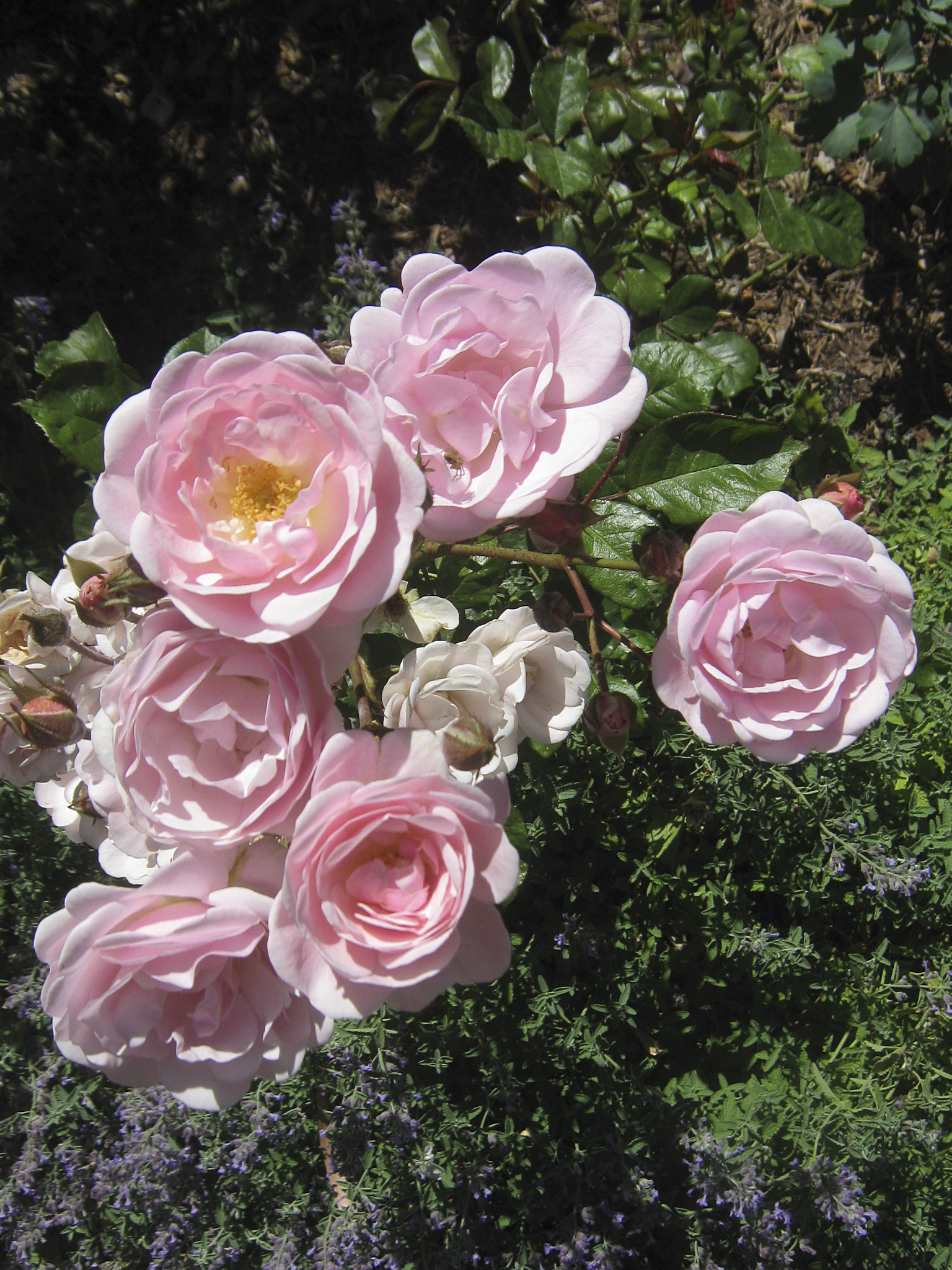
'Australia Felix' 1919, Hybrid Tea. Low growing but not a dwarf. Possibly not Clark's original. Australia Felix ("happy Australia") was the name given by Thomas Mitchell the explorer to lush parts of western Victoria.

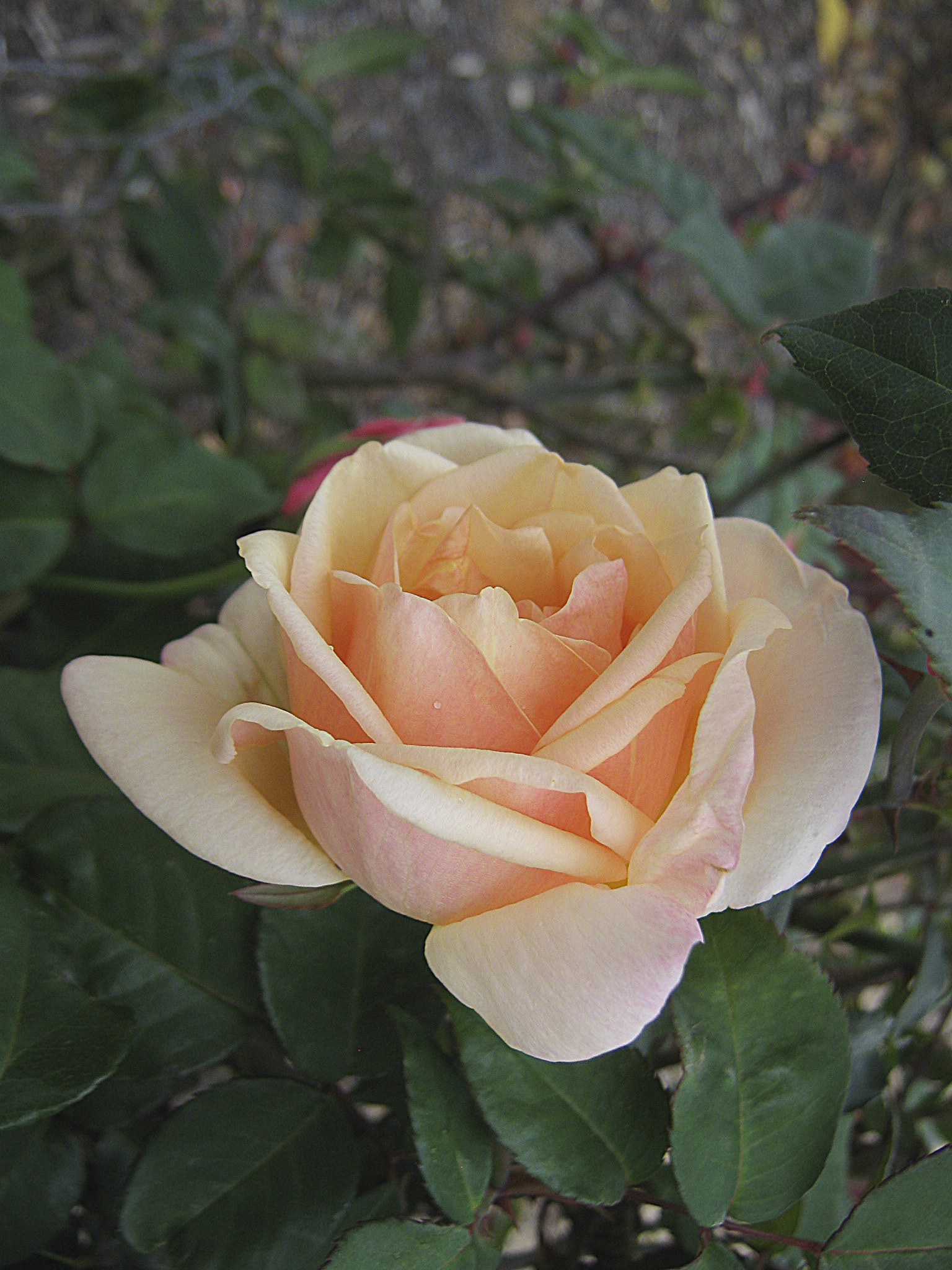
'Baxter Beauty', discovered by Russell Grimwade before 1927 at Baxter, Victoria, is a sport or seedling of Clark's 'Lorraine Lee'.

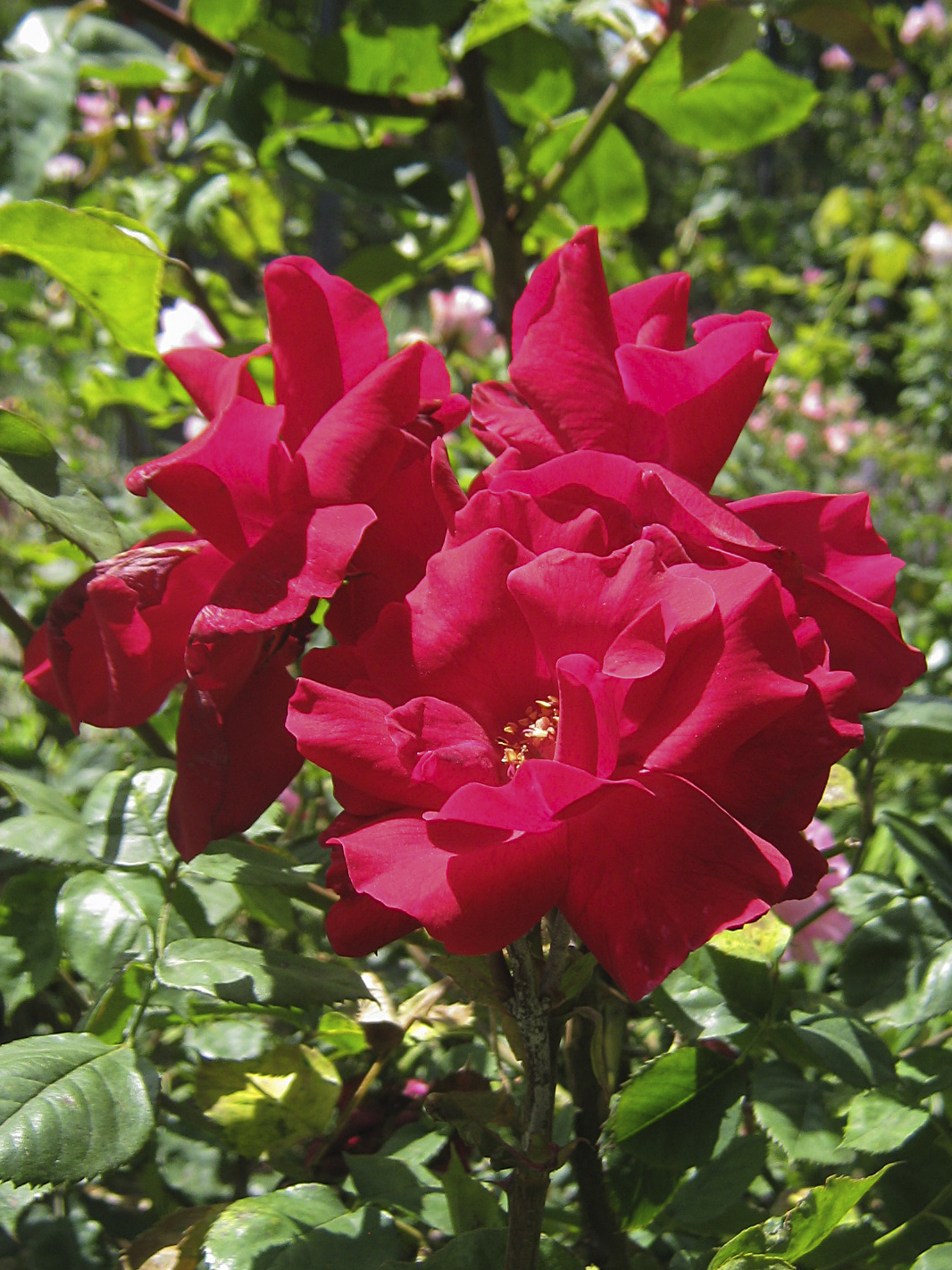
'Billy Boiler', 1927, Hybrid Tea. Billy boiler was slang for a hot day.

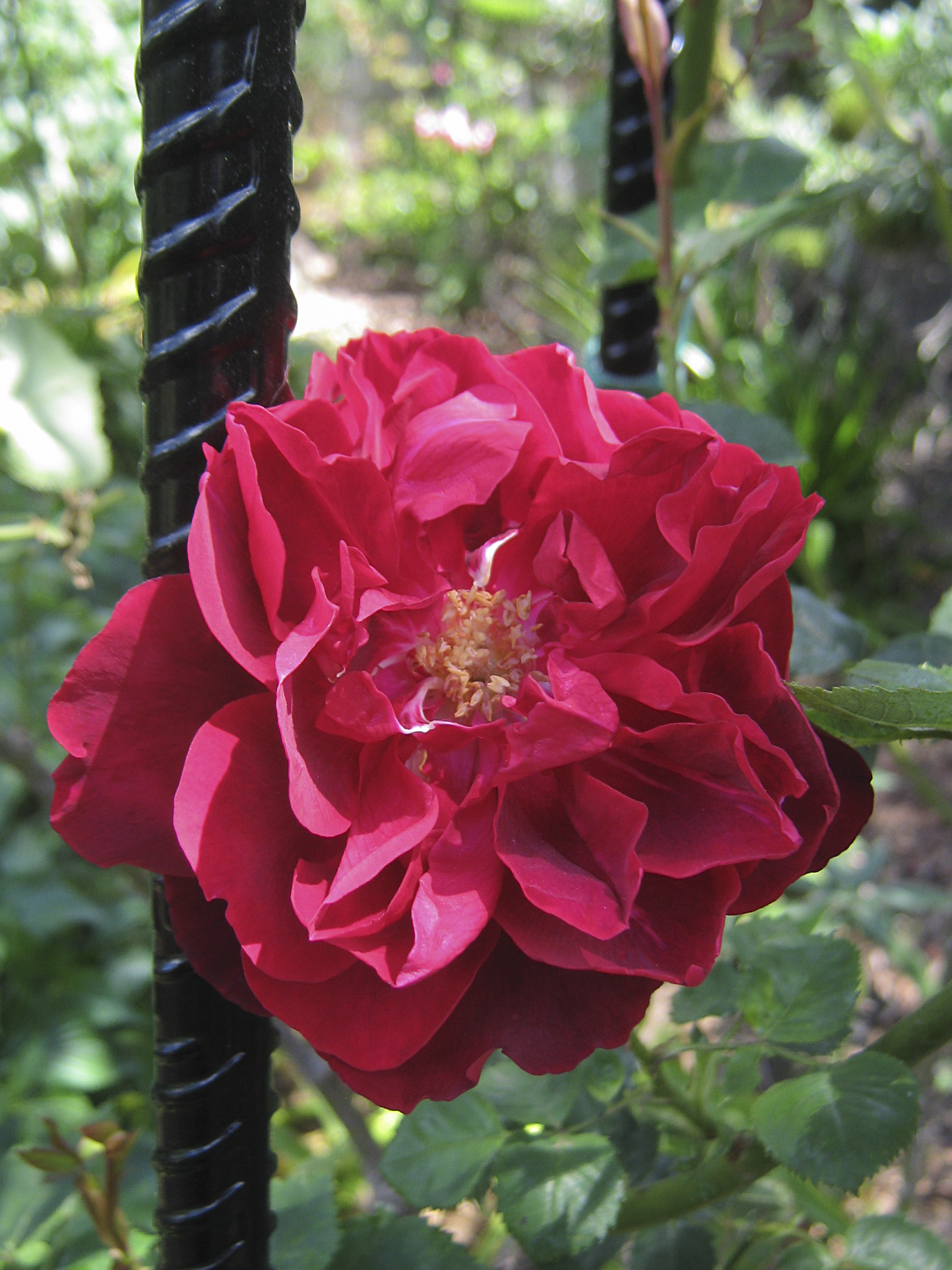
'Black Boy' 1919, Hybrid Tea climber. Far and away the most popular climbing rose in Australia between the World Wars.

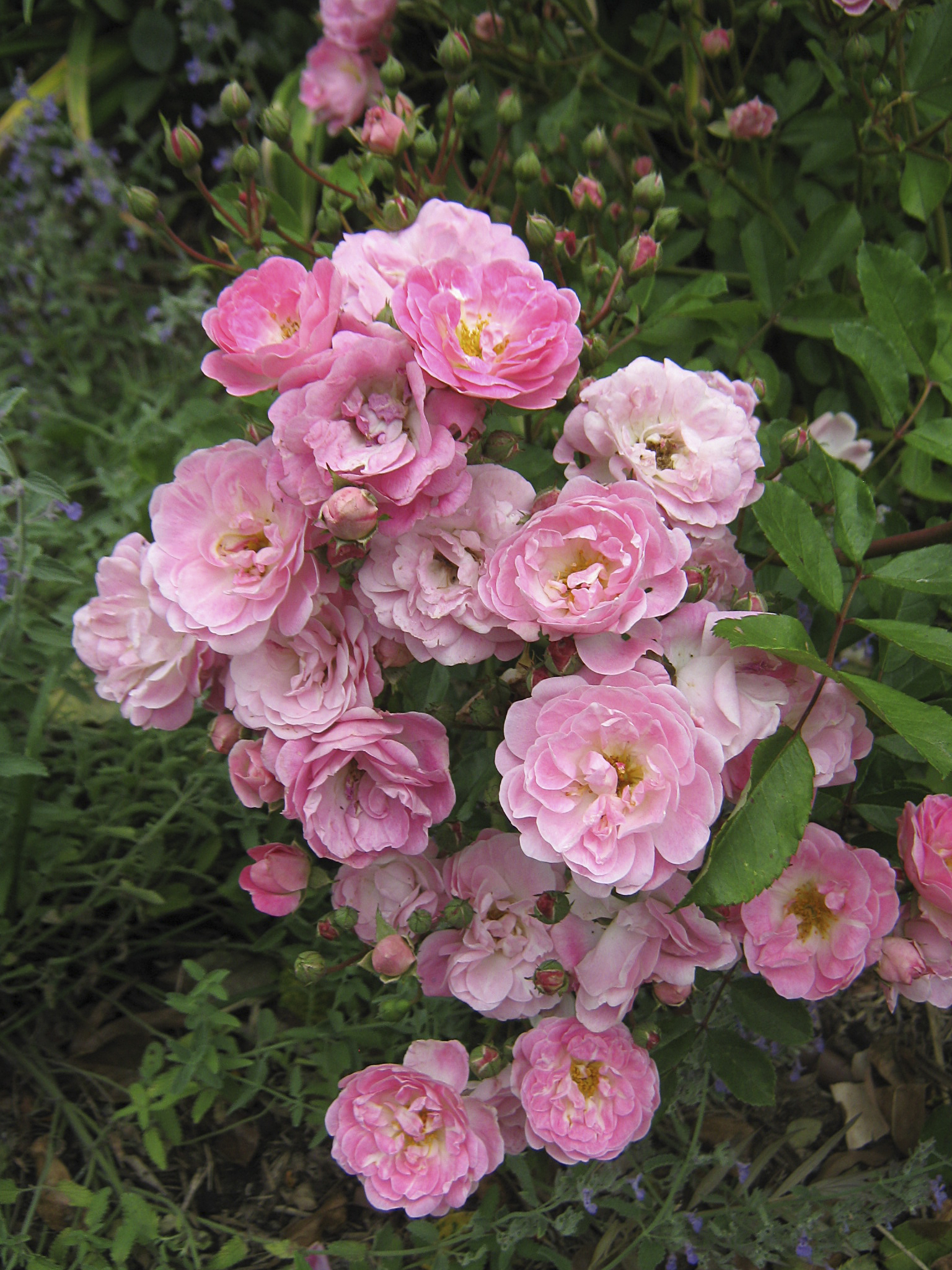
'Borderer', Floribunda, 1919.

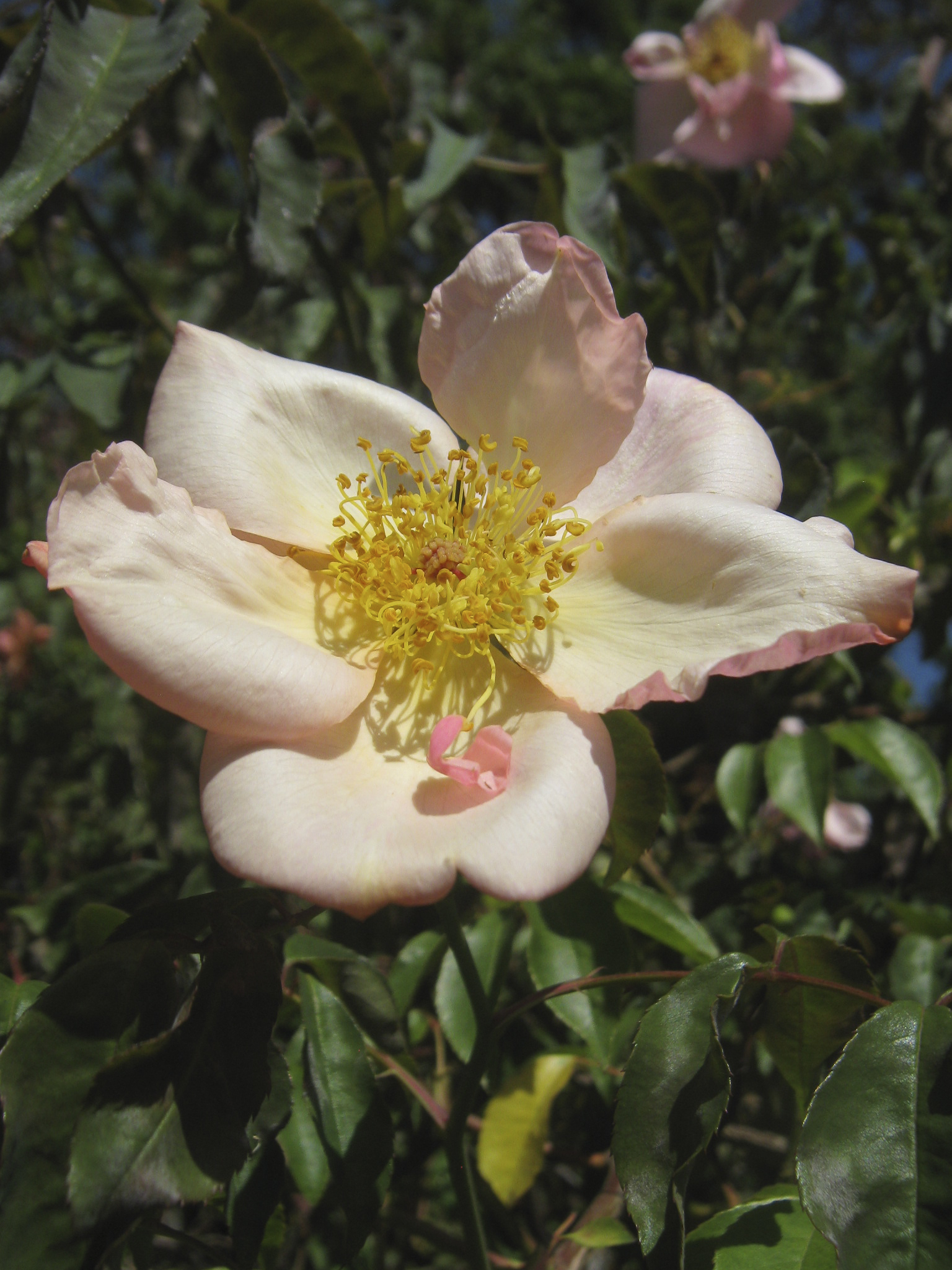
"Broadway", 1933, Hybrid Gigantea probably by Clark. Also known as "Mrs Oswin's Gigangtea". "Broadway" can look like a climbing form of Rosa mutabilis.

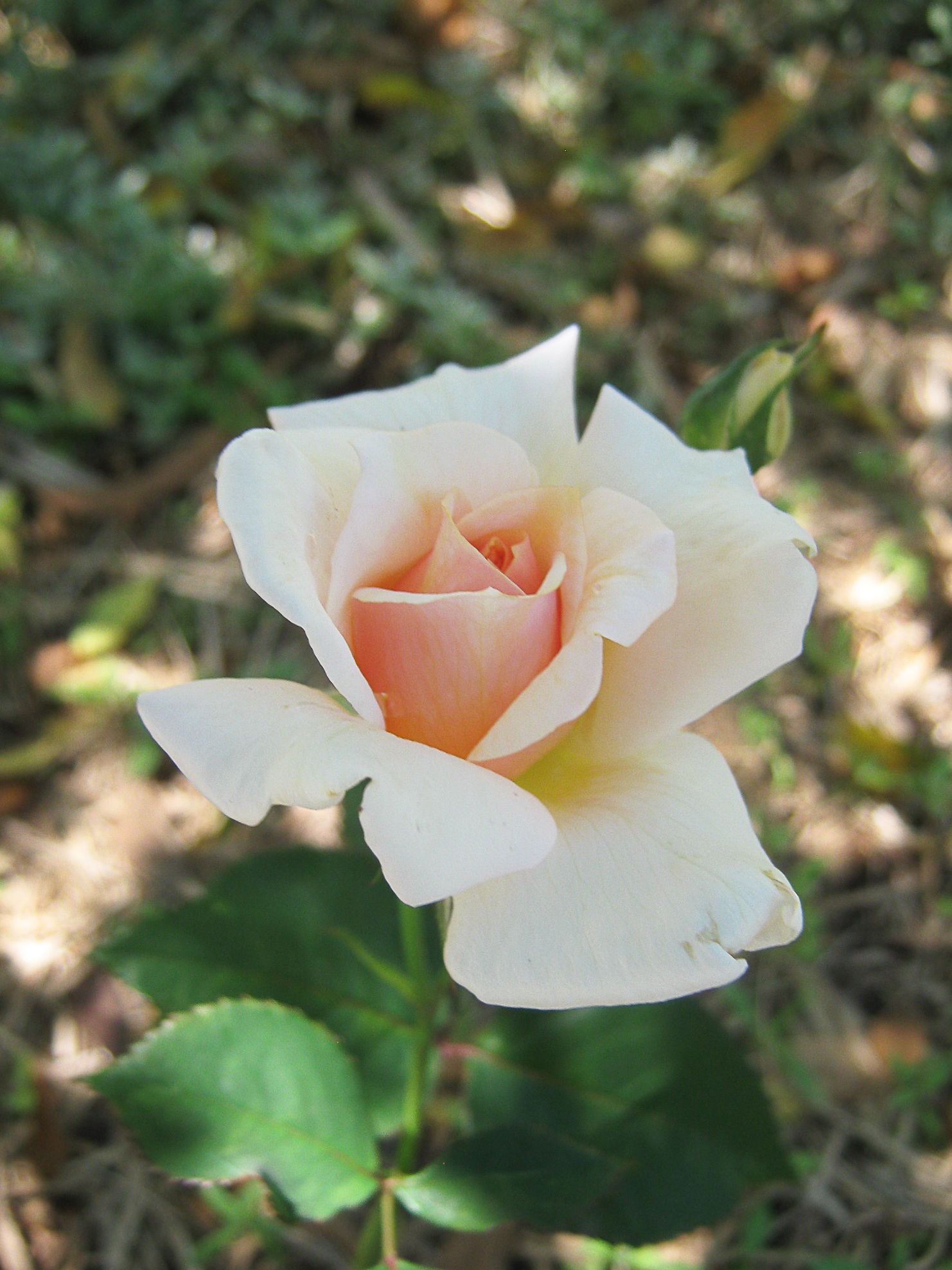
'Busybody' 1929. A miniature Hybrid Tea with some scent and apricot-beige colour, deepening in autumn.

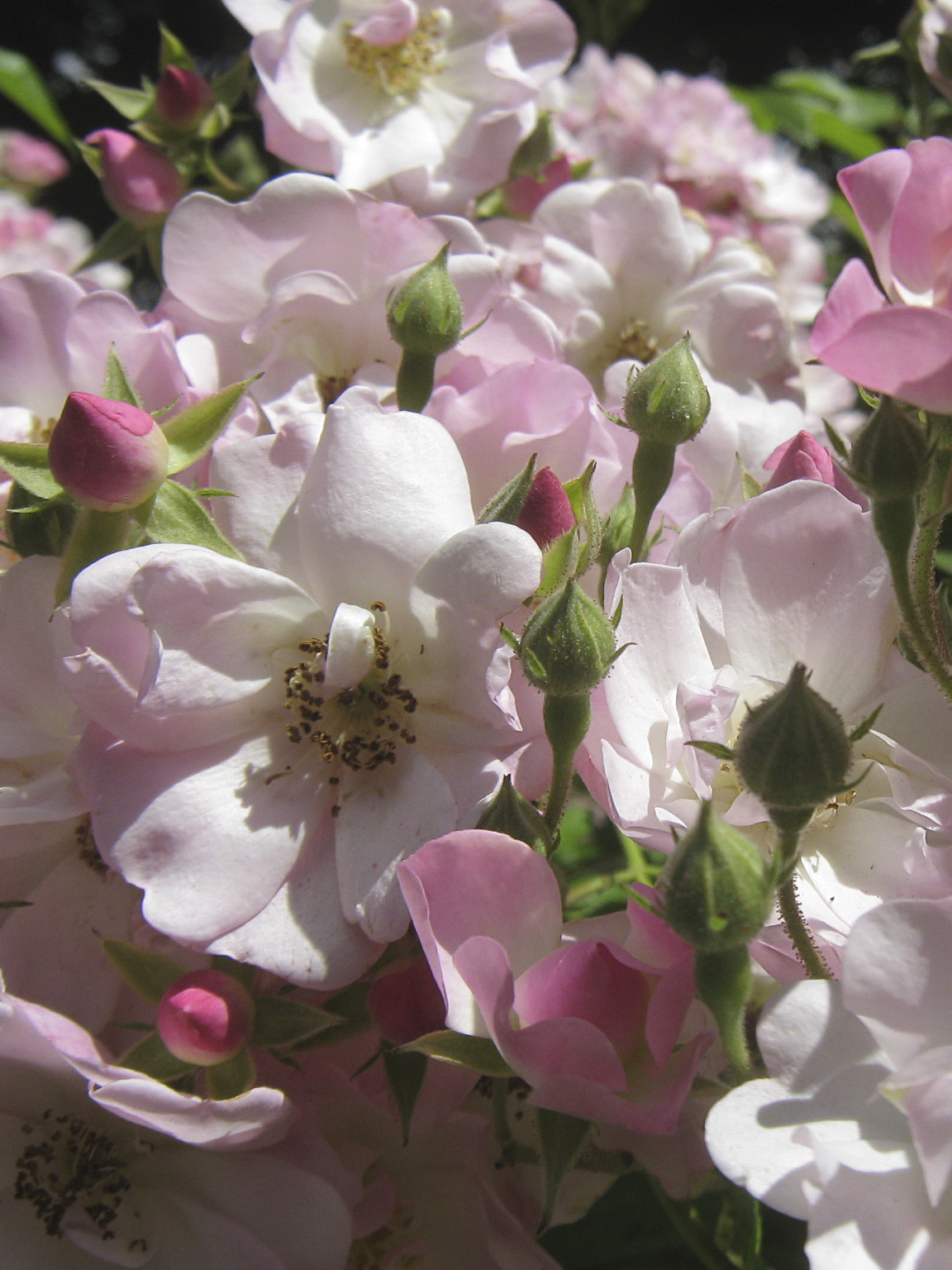
'Cherub' 1923, Rambler. Probably not Clark's original, which had smaller, more double, salmon-pink flowers.

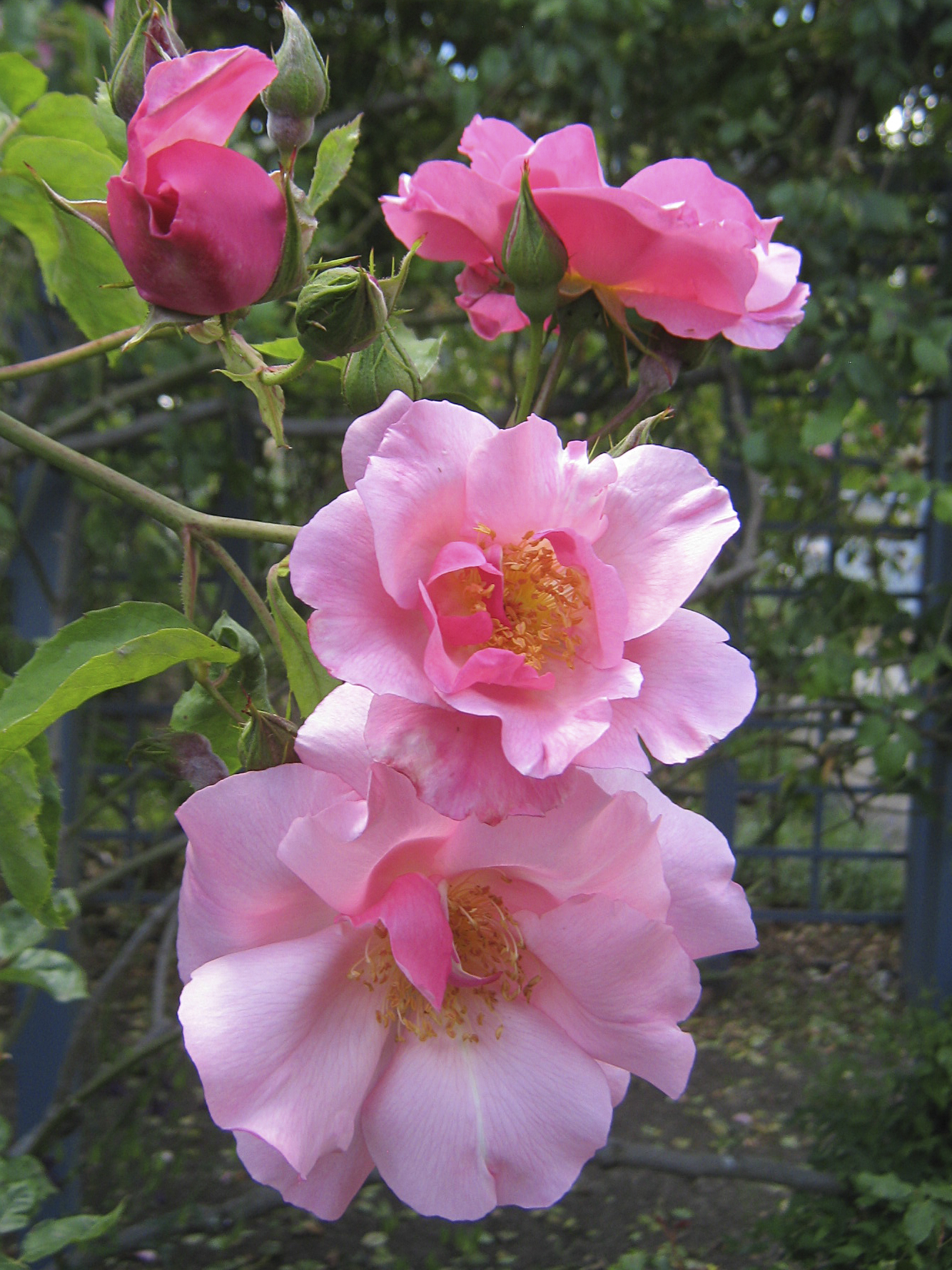
'Cicely Lascelles', 1937, Climber. Cicely Lascelles (1895–1989), a champion golfer, came from a landed family who were friends of the Clarks.

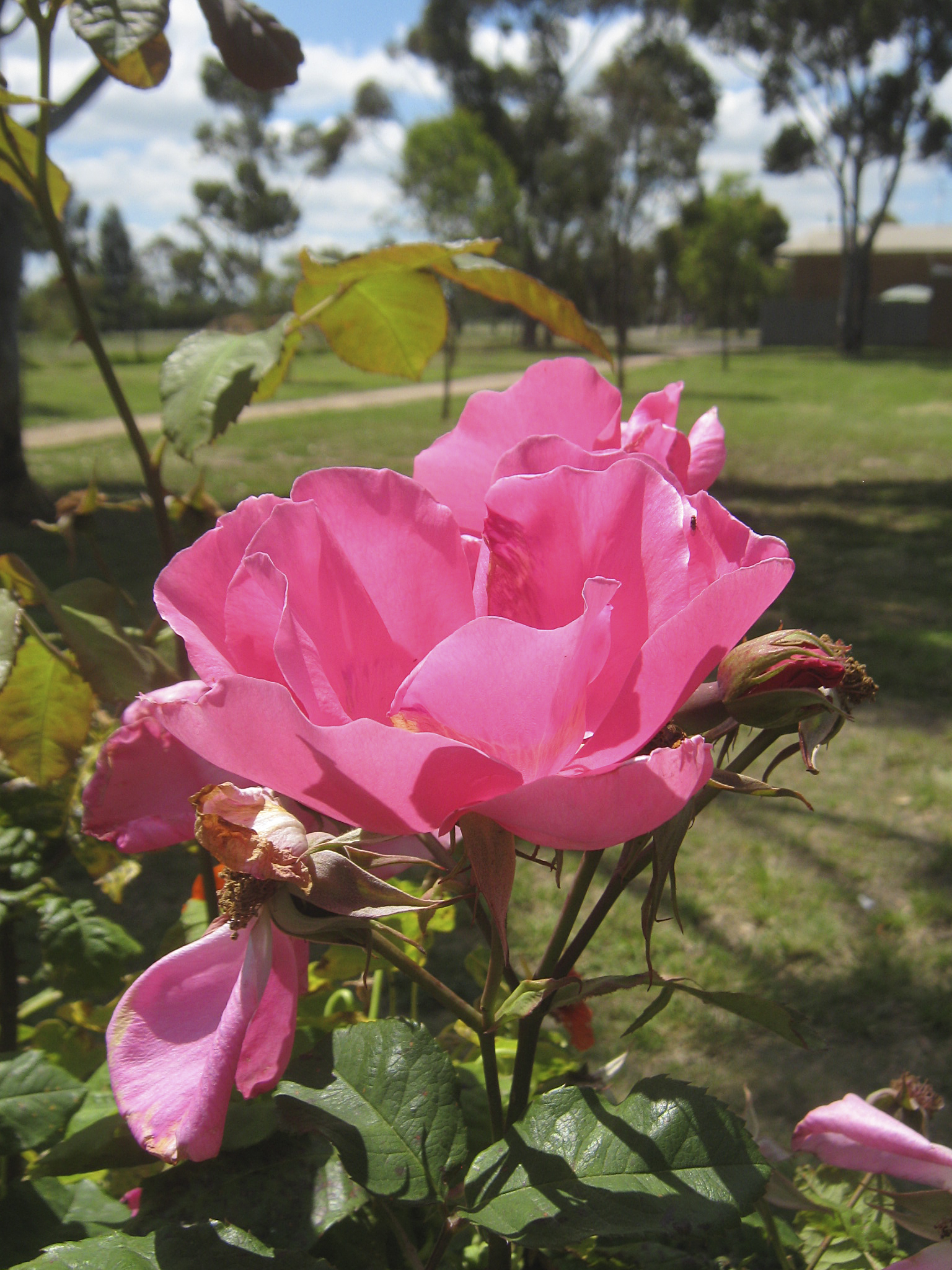
'Cicely O'Rorke, 1937, Hybrid Tea climber. Cicely O'Rorke was a New Zealand relation by marriage who often stayed with the Clarks in the 1930s and 1940s.

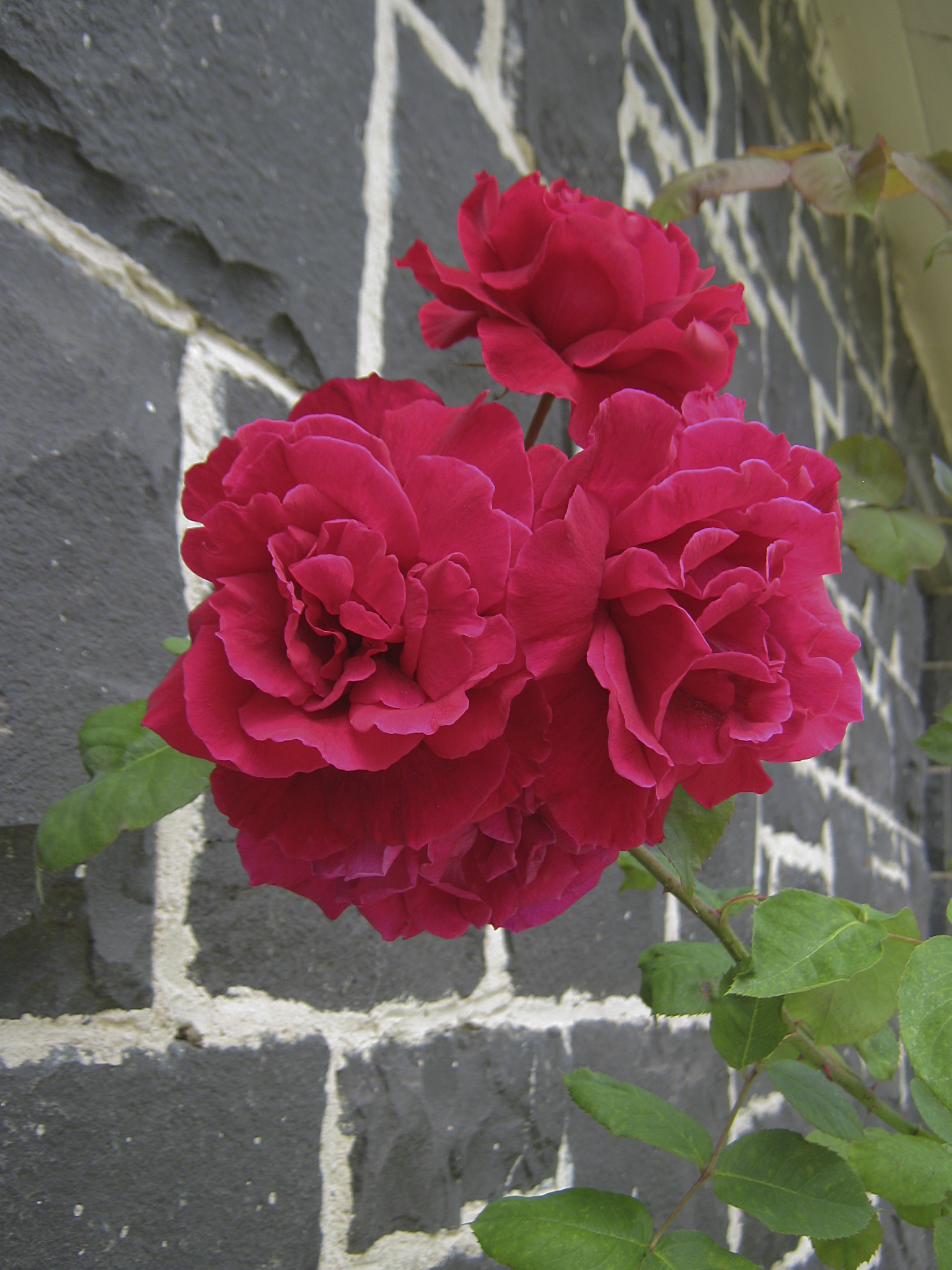
'Countess of Stradbroke' 1928, Climber. The Earl of Stradbroke was Governor of Victoria 1920–1926. The Countess raced horses there and stayed at the Clarks'.

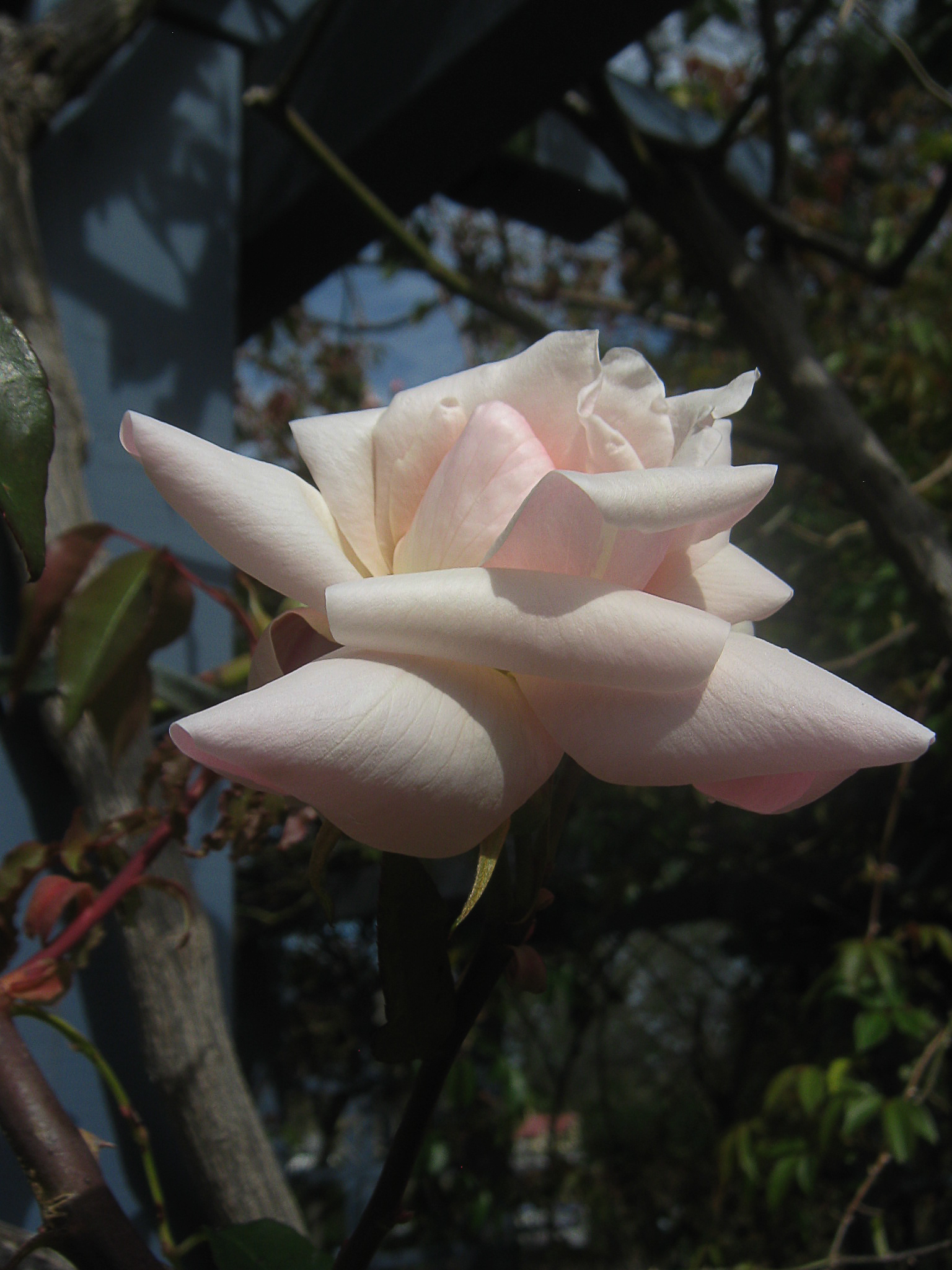
'Courier' 1930, Hybrid Gigantea climber. Probably named after a contemporary racehorse.

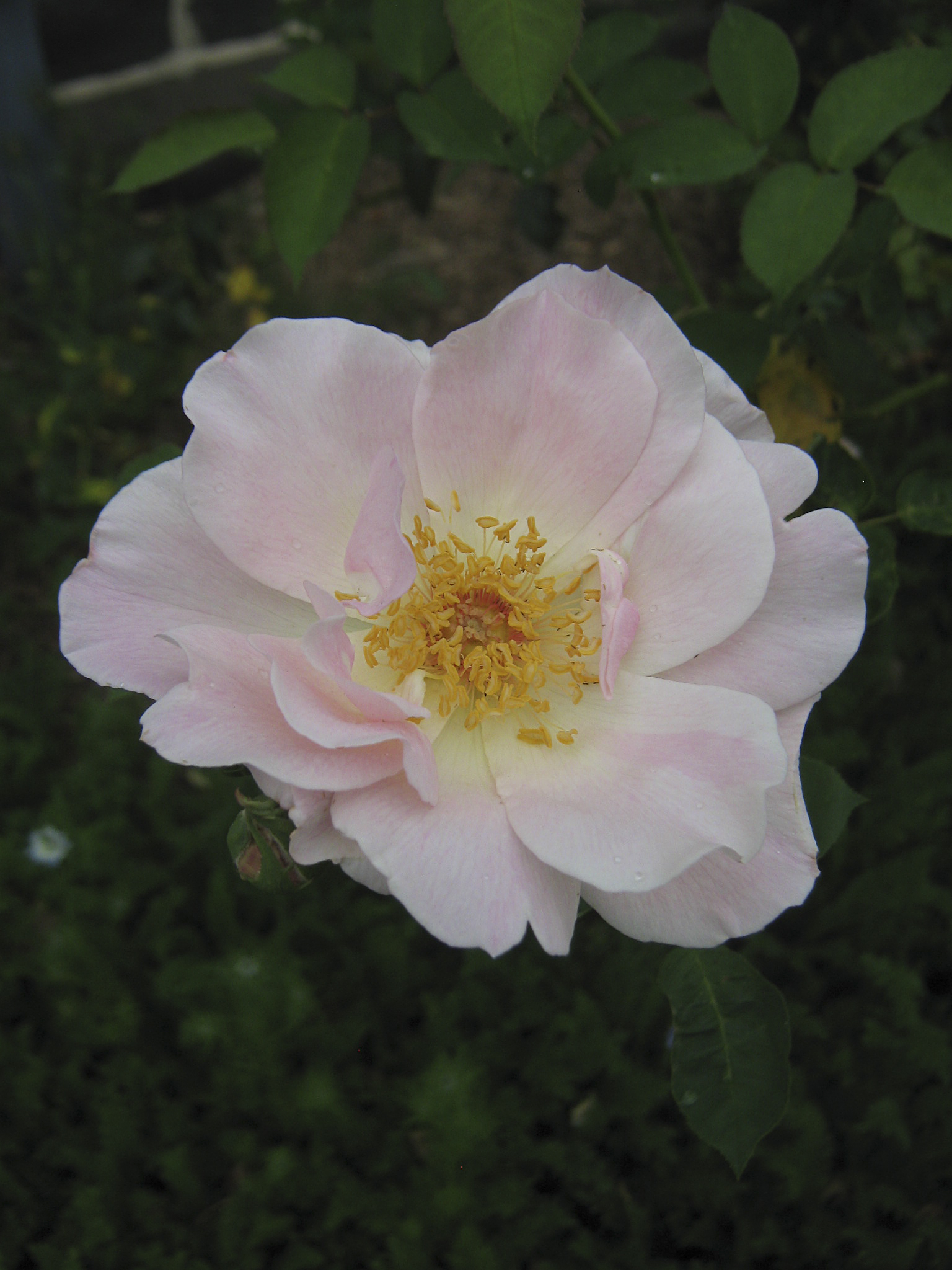
'Daydream' 1925, Climber. Other-worldly scent. According to Clark, a rose "like a waterlily".

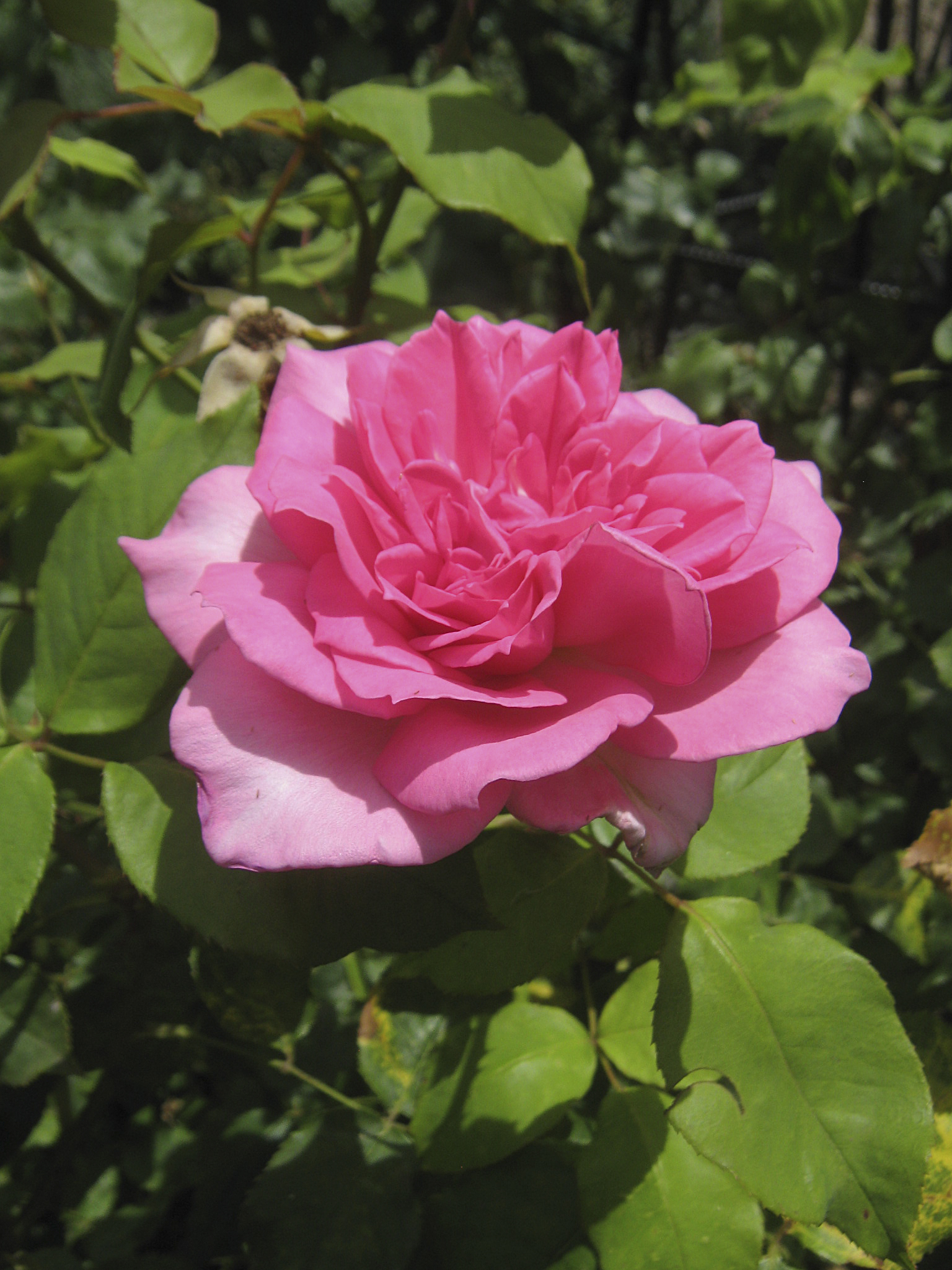
Diana Allen 1939, Hybrid Tea with Damask scent. Diana Allen was a Clark family friend in New Zealand and Australia, a champion skier who died young in childbirth.

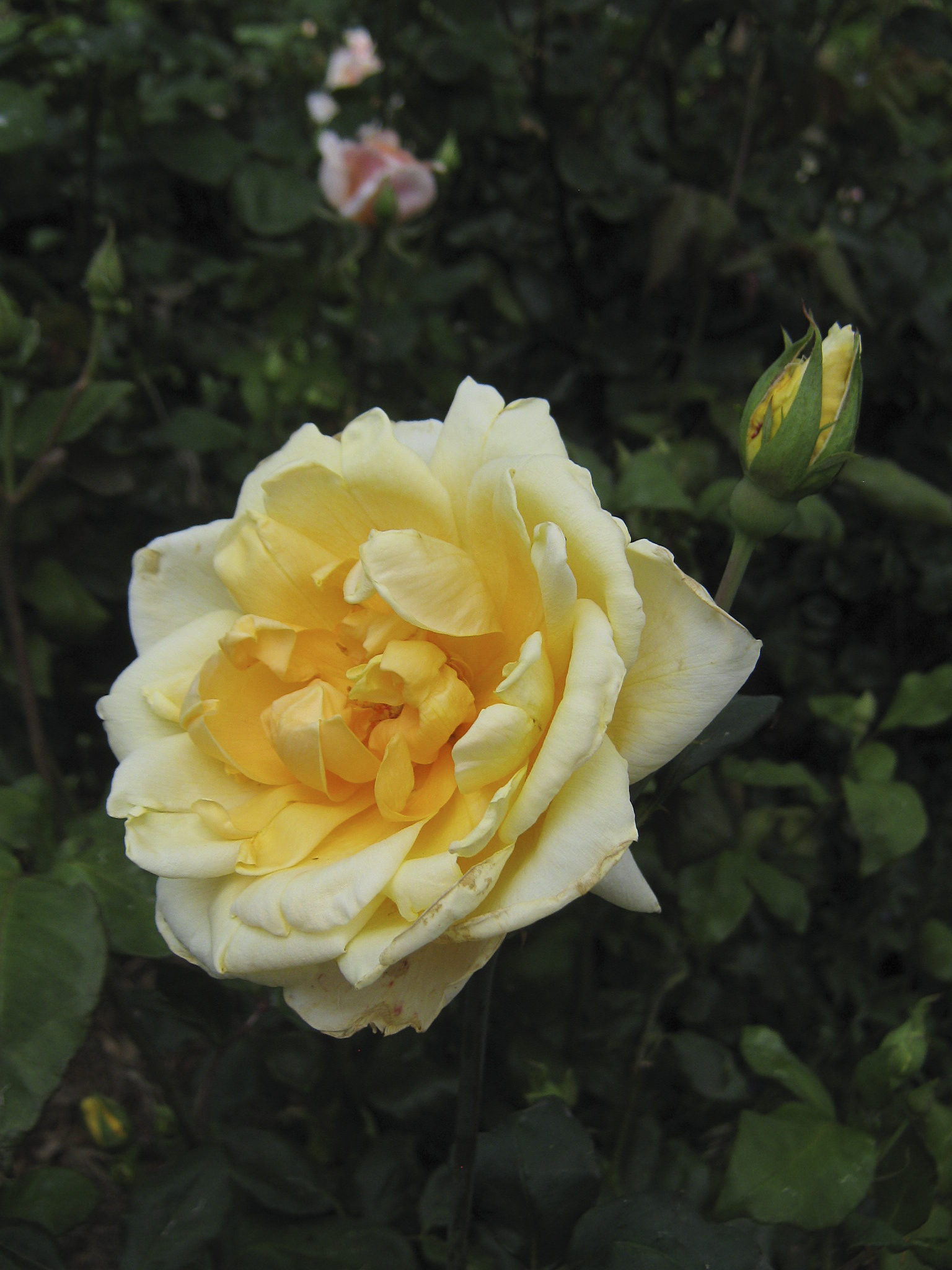
'Dividend' 1931, Hybrid Tea. Dividend was a successful racehorse of Clark's.

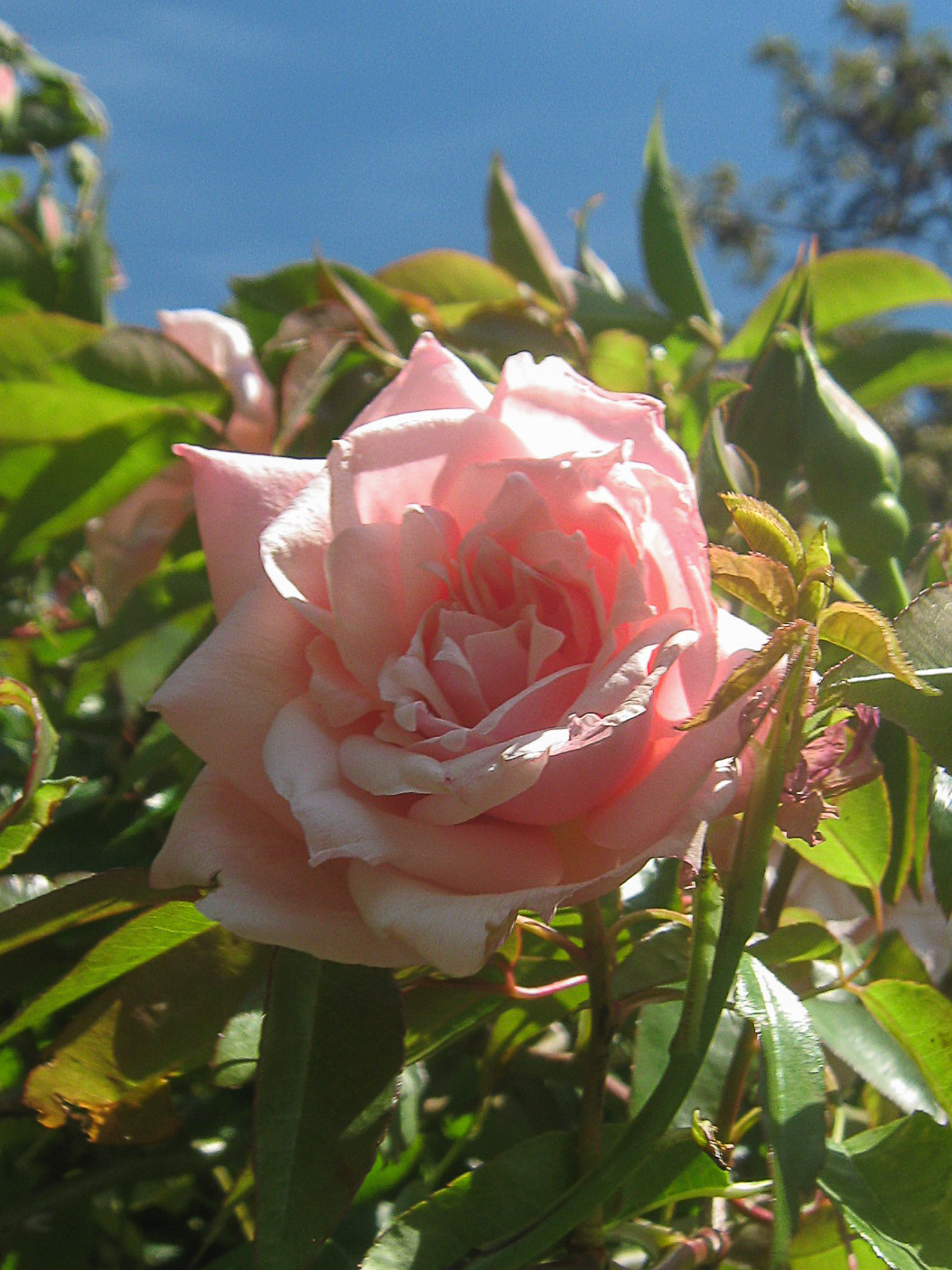
'Doris Downes' 1932, well-scented Hybrid Gigantea. Doris Mary Robb (1890–1981) was a stylish Melbourne beauty who married Dr Rupert Major-General Downes. She and Clark were fellow rose breeders.

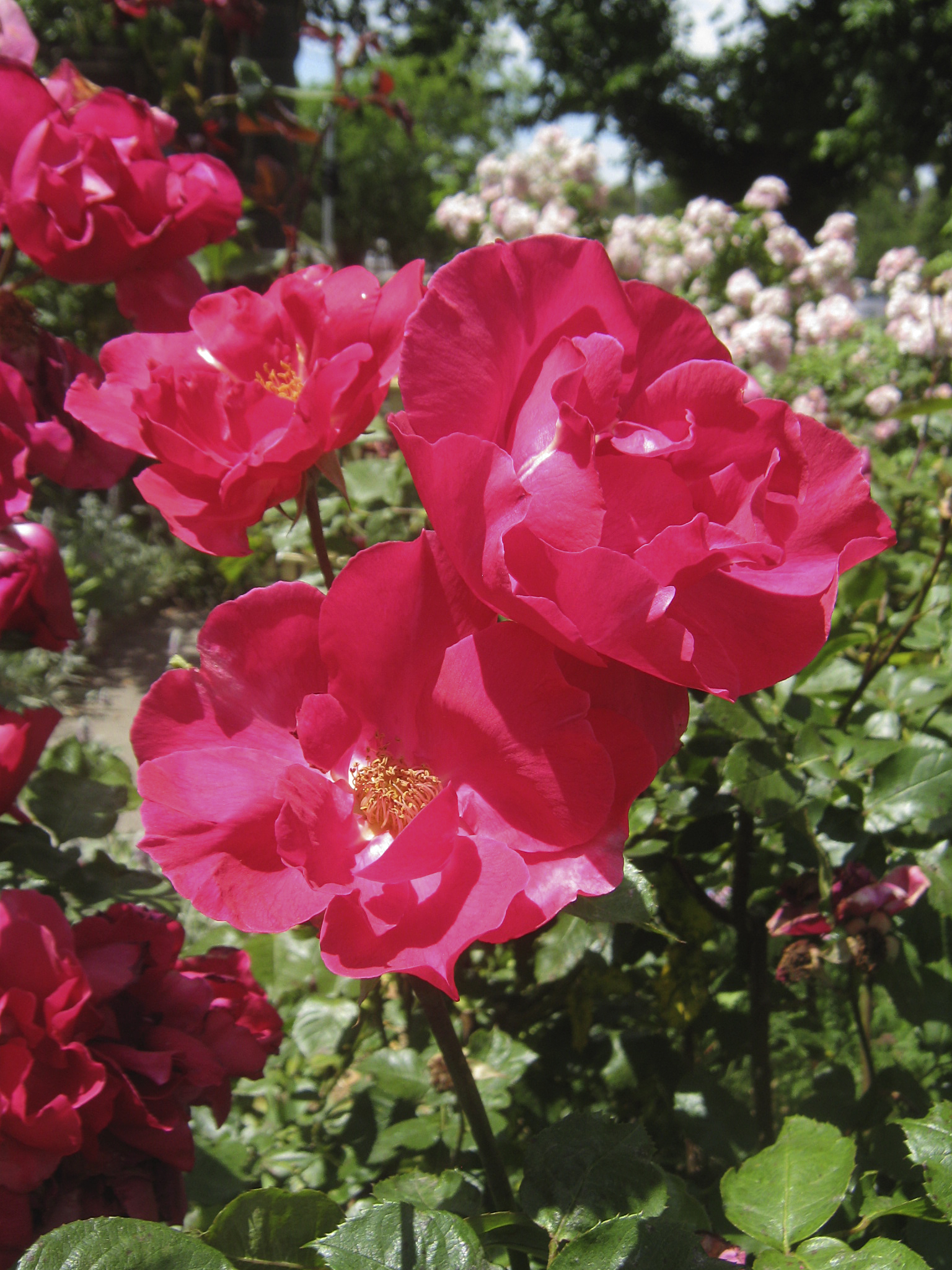
'Editor Stewart' 1939, Hybrid Tea. T.A. Stewart was editor of the Australian Rose Annual for thirty years.

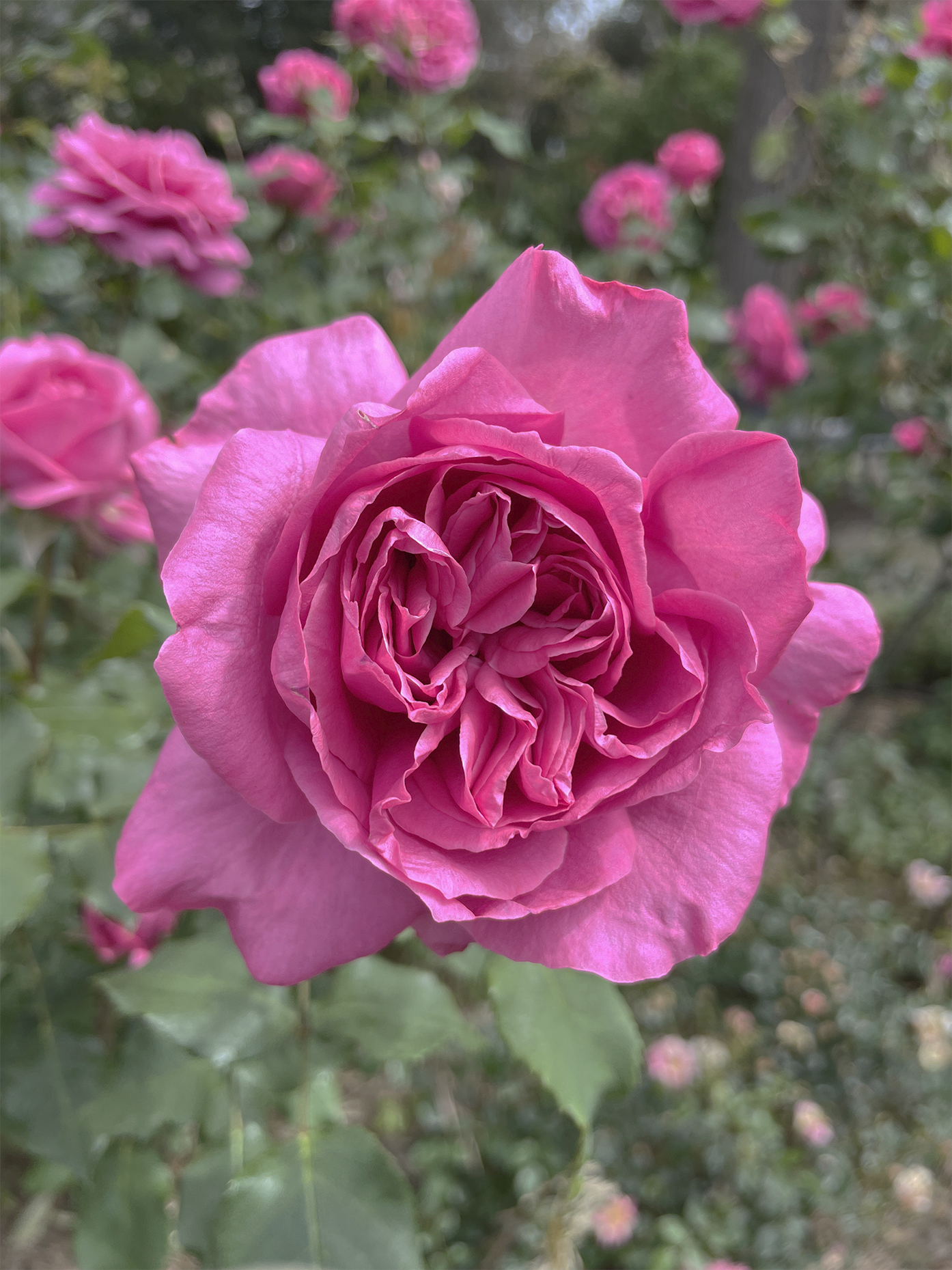
'Emily Rhodes' 1937, Climber. Cupped rose-silk flowers with tea-and-lemon scent; recurrent. Emily Rhodes was a New Zealand sister-in-law of Alister Clark, twice over.

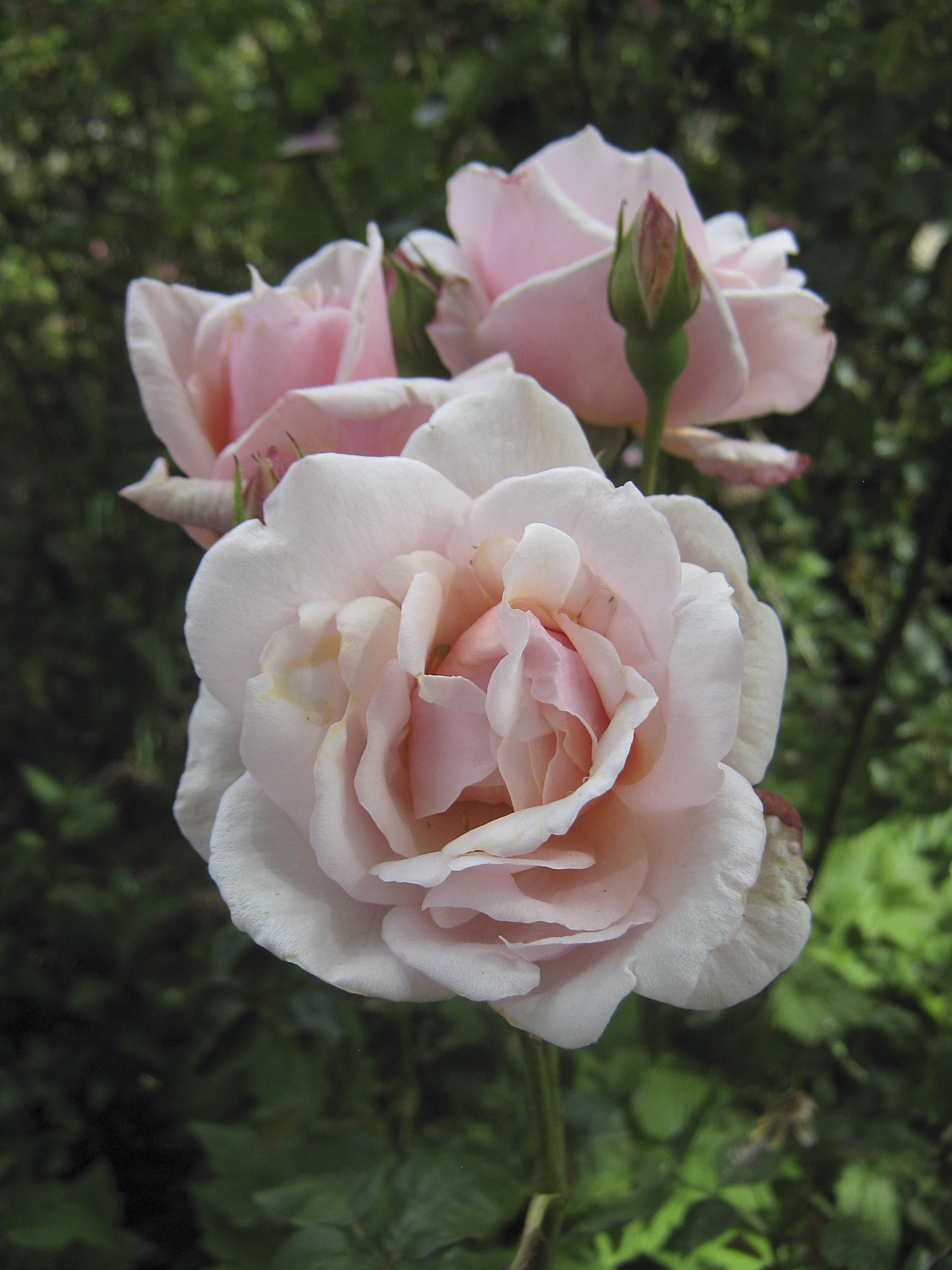
'Fairlie Rede' 1937, Hybrid Tea. Fairlie Rede was an artist who ran a nursery on the Mornington Peninsula. She edited the Australian Rose Annual for a time.

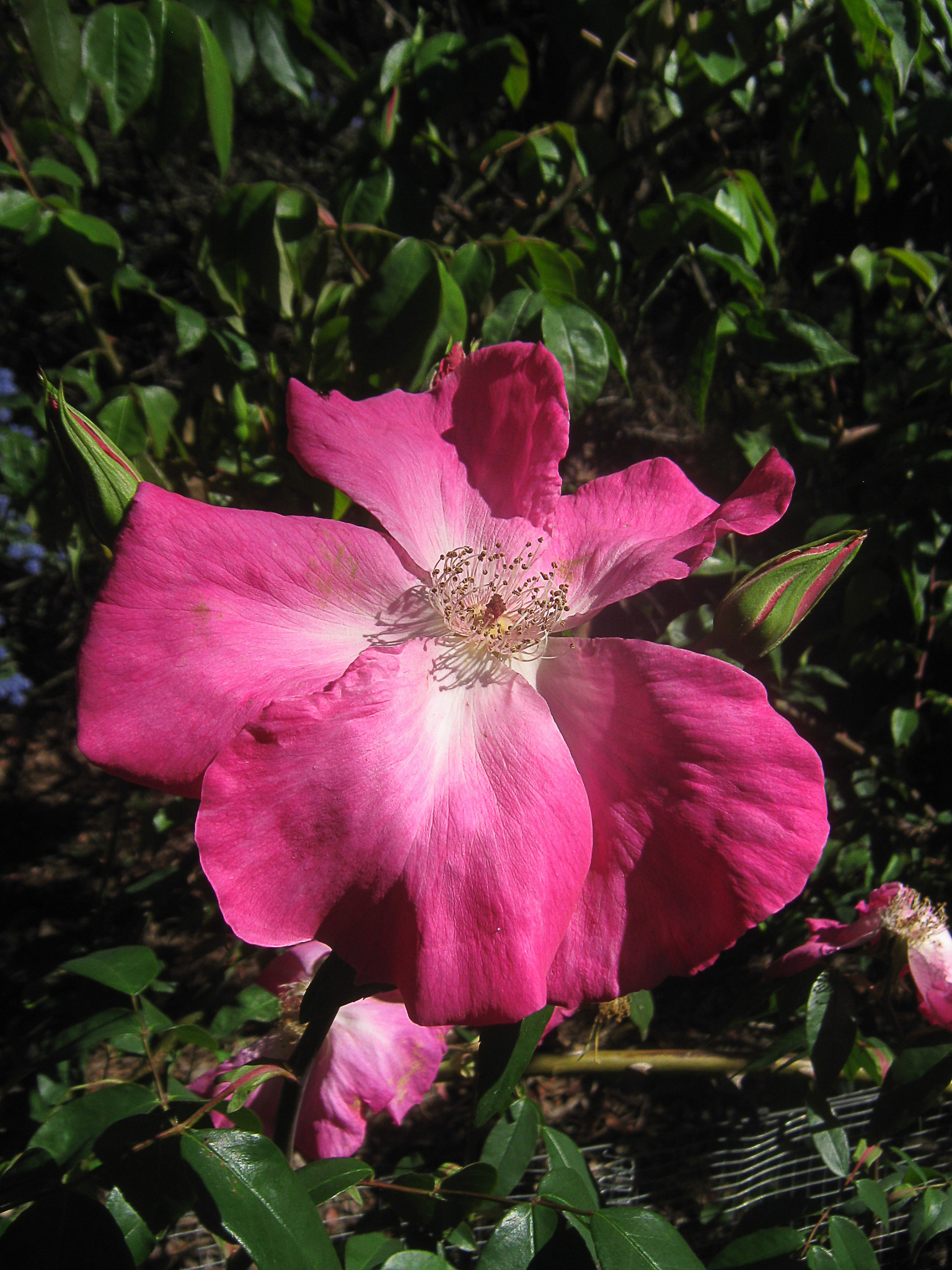
'Flying Colours' 1922, Hybrid Gigantea climber. Very large scented flowers once a year. Flying Colours was a racehorse.

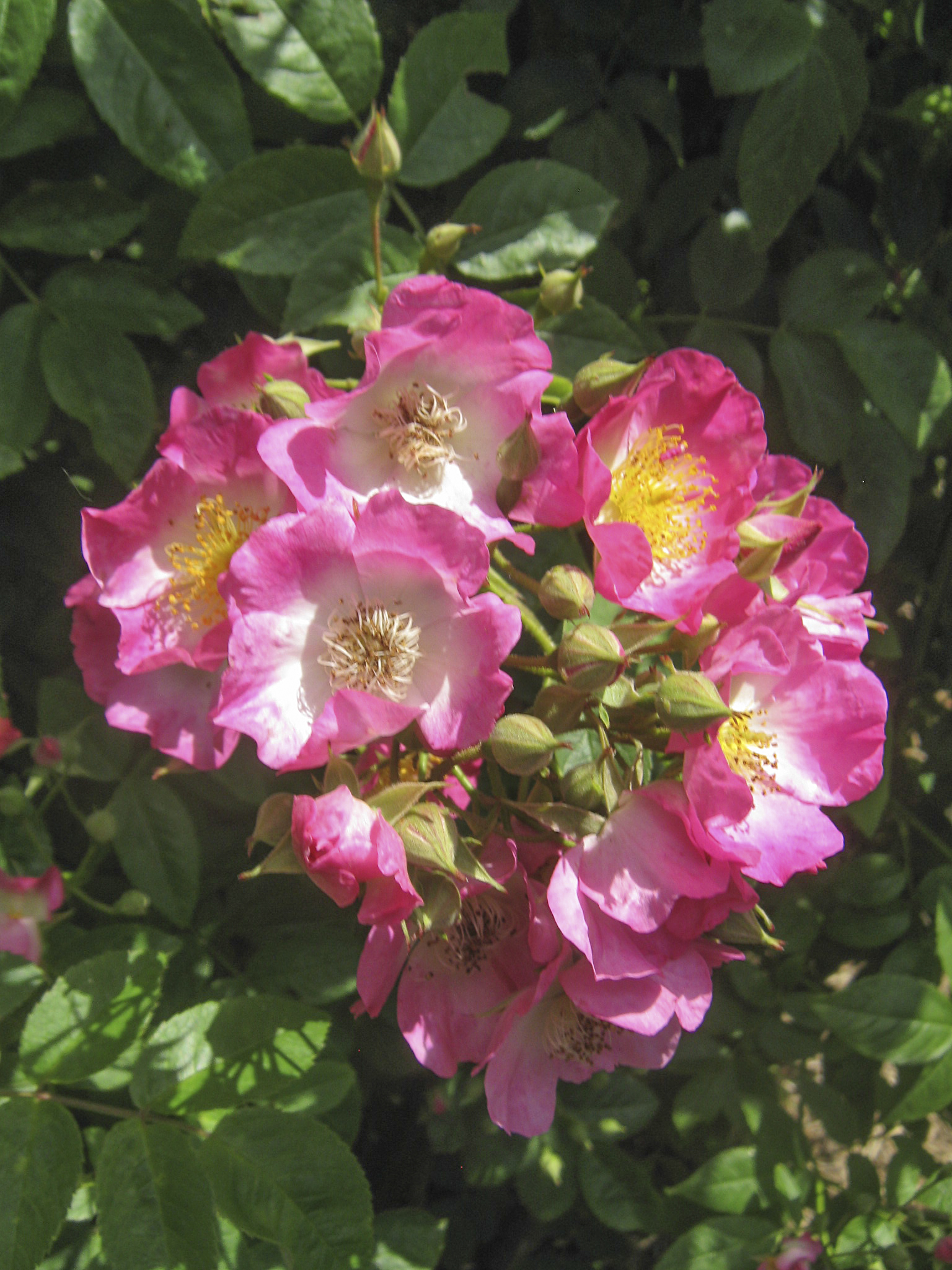
'Gladsome' 1937, Hybrid Multiflora. 'Gladsome' puts on a huge display, in spring only.

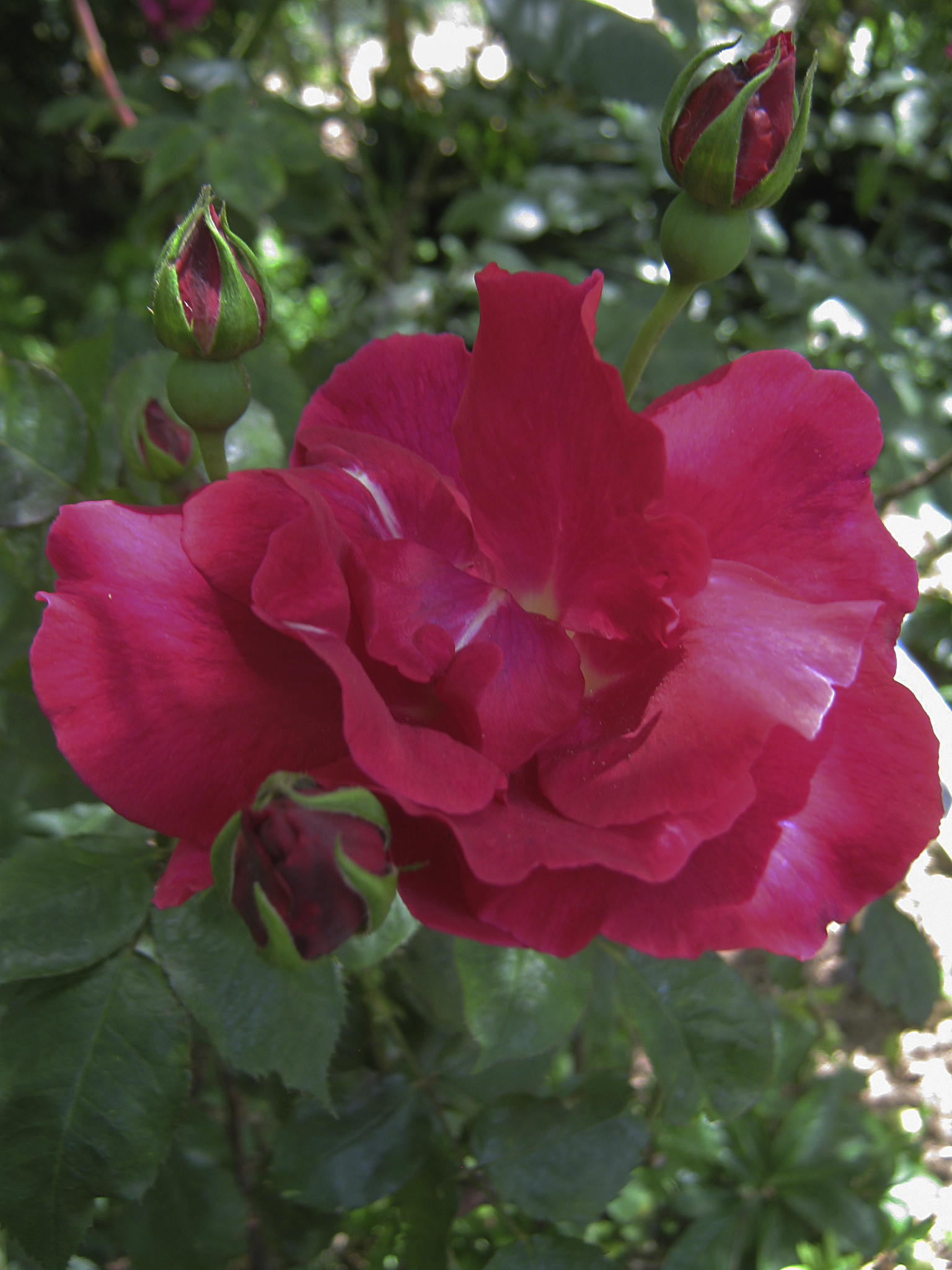
'Glenara' 1951, Hybrid Tea found at the Clarks' house of the same name on Deep Creek, Bulla.

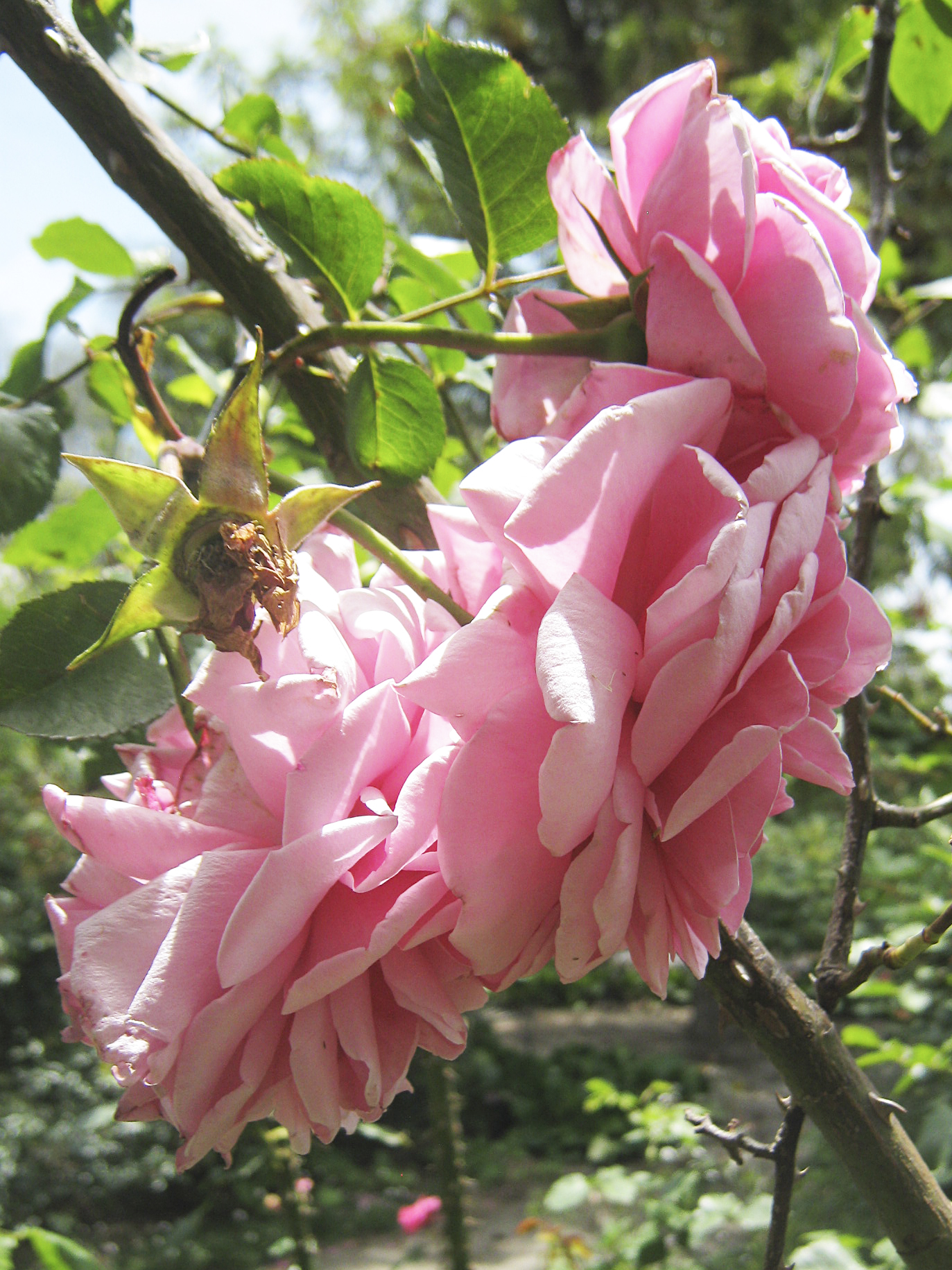
'Glenara No. 14' A two-toned pink Hybrid Tea climber found by John Nieuwesteeg in 2001 at Glenara.

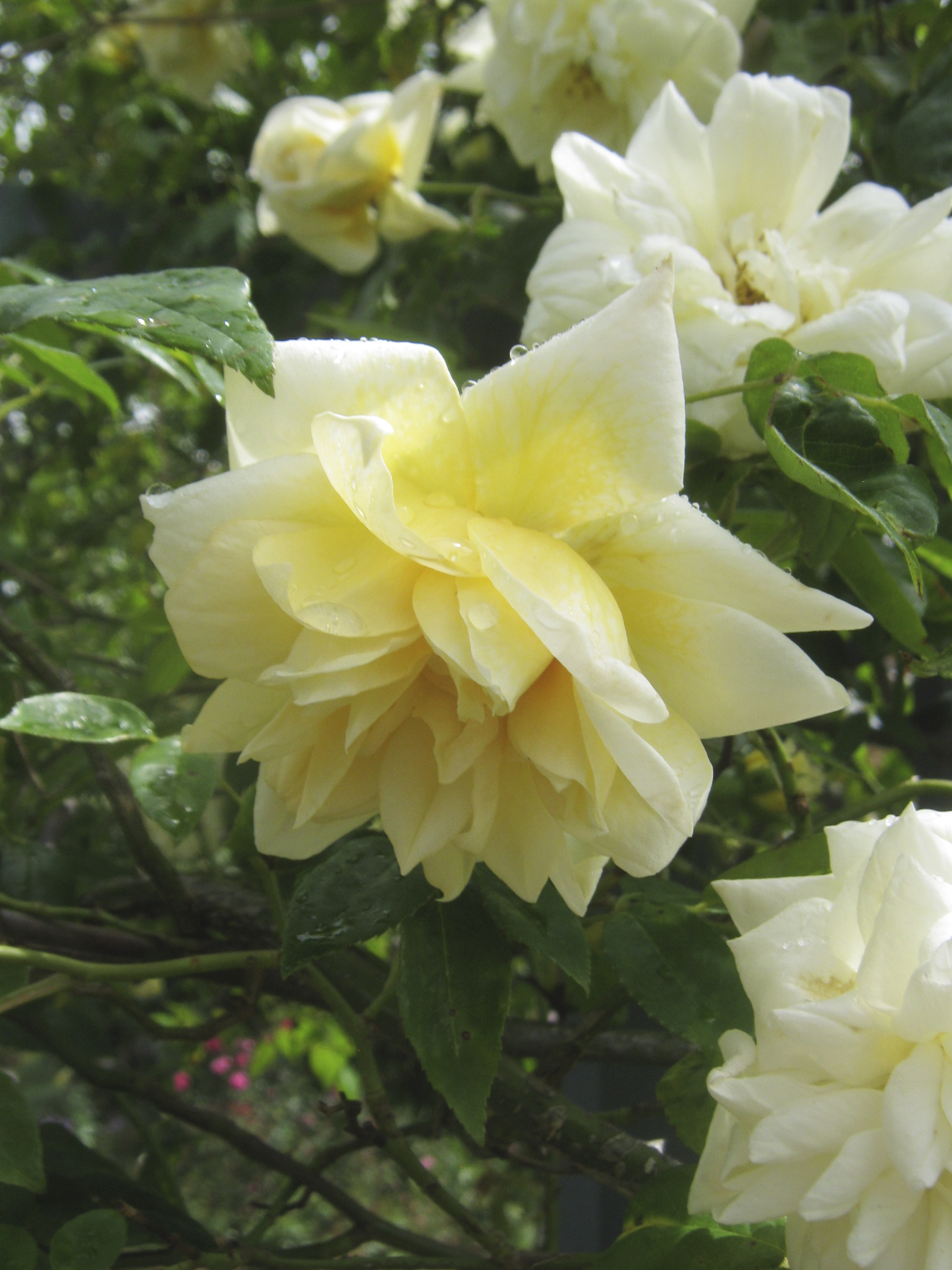
'Golden Vision' 1922, Hybrid Gigantea climber. Flowers once in spring or summer. More lemon-yellow than golden.

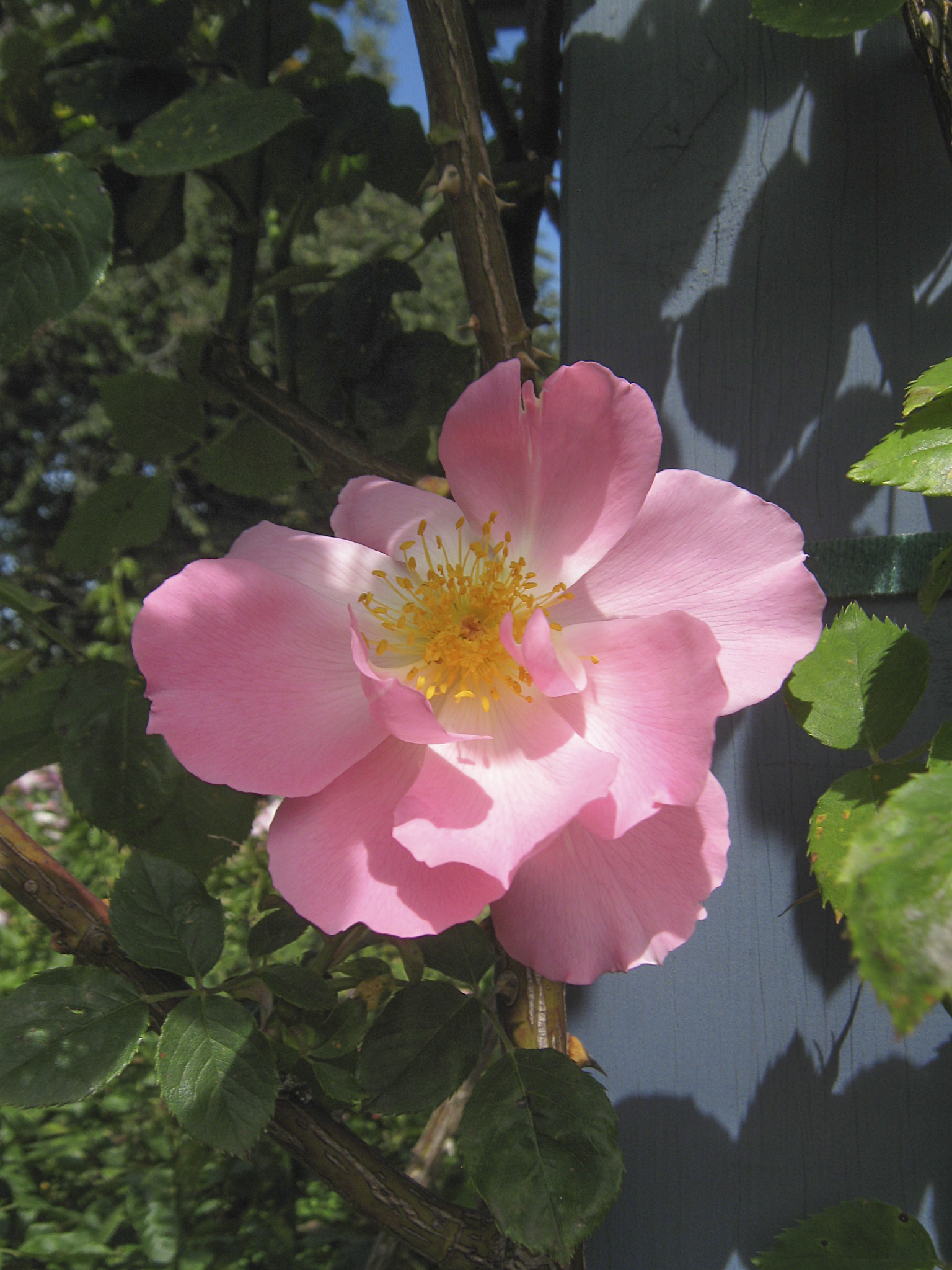
'Gwen Nash' 1920, Hybrid Tea climber. Gwendoline Alice Nash (1893–1972) was the middle child in a family very close to the Clarks.

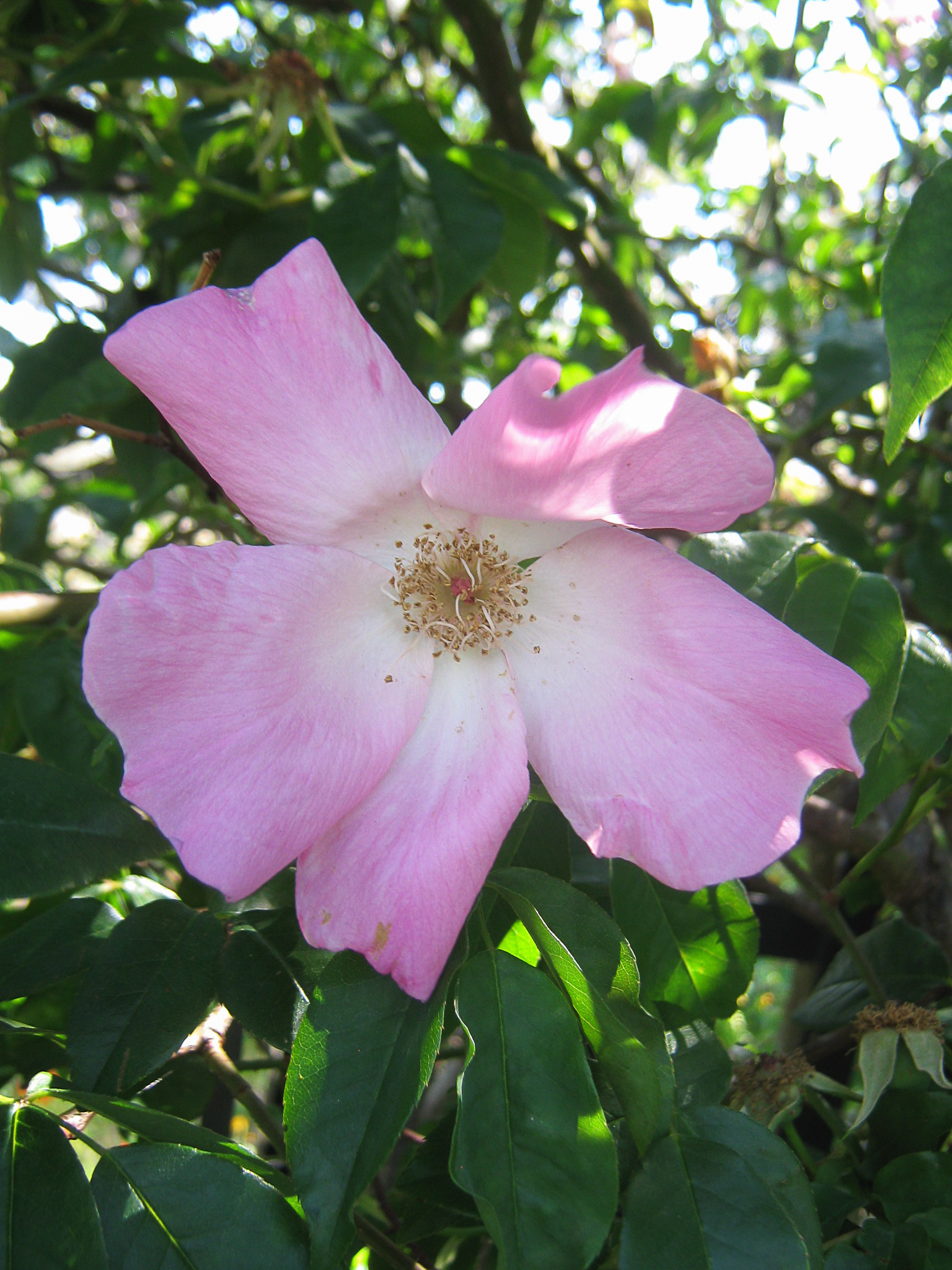
'Harbinger' 1923, Hybrid Gigantea. Harbinger of course of spring.

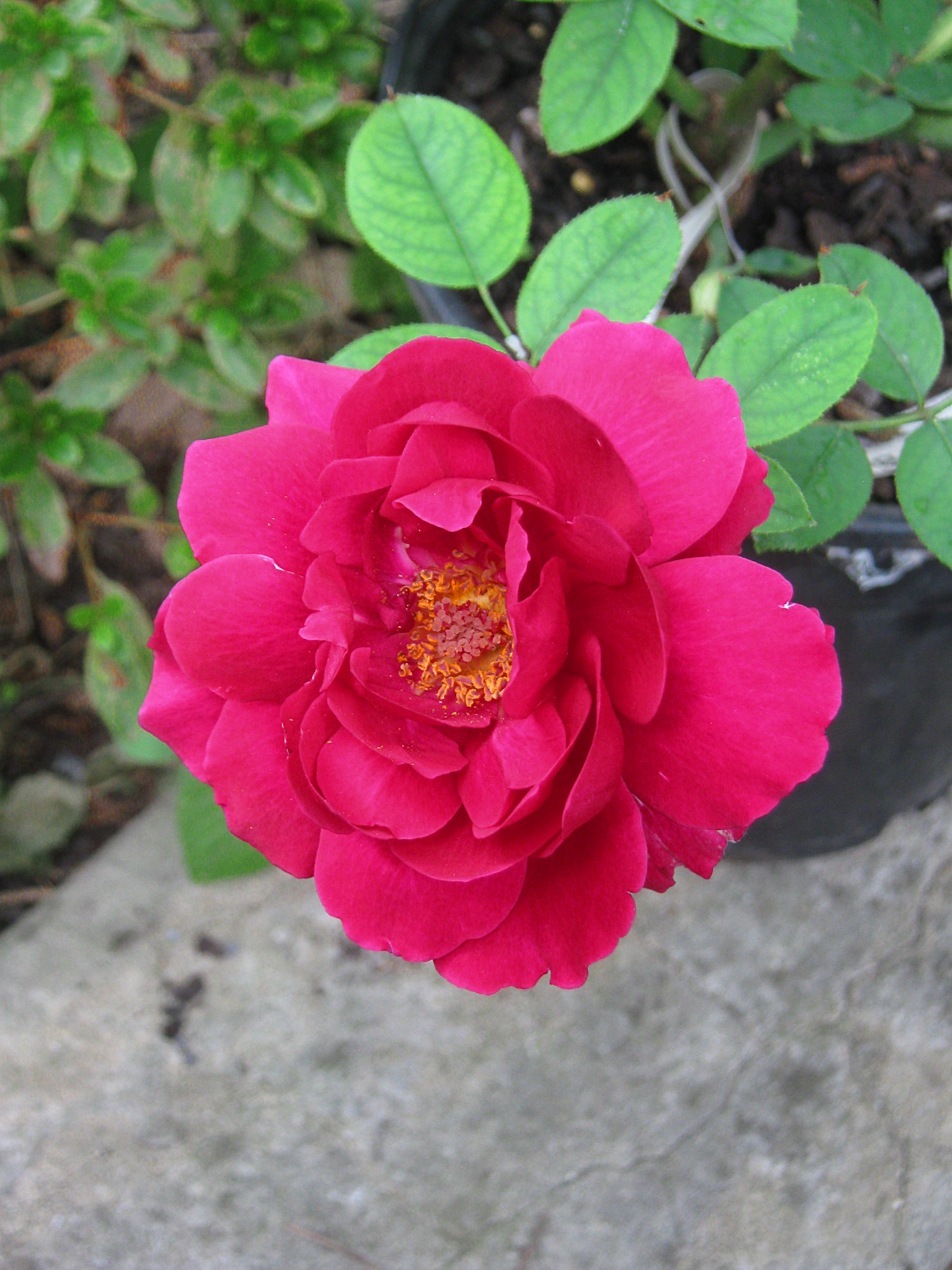
'Herbert Brunning' 1940, Hybrid Tea. Herbert John Brunning (1864–1949) was a well known St Kilda nurseryman, prominent in the National Rose Society.

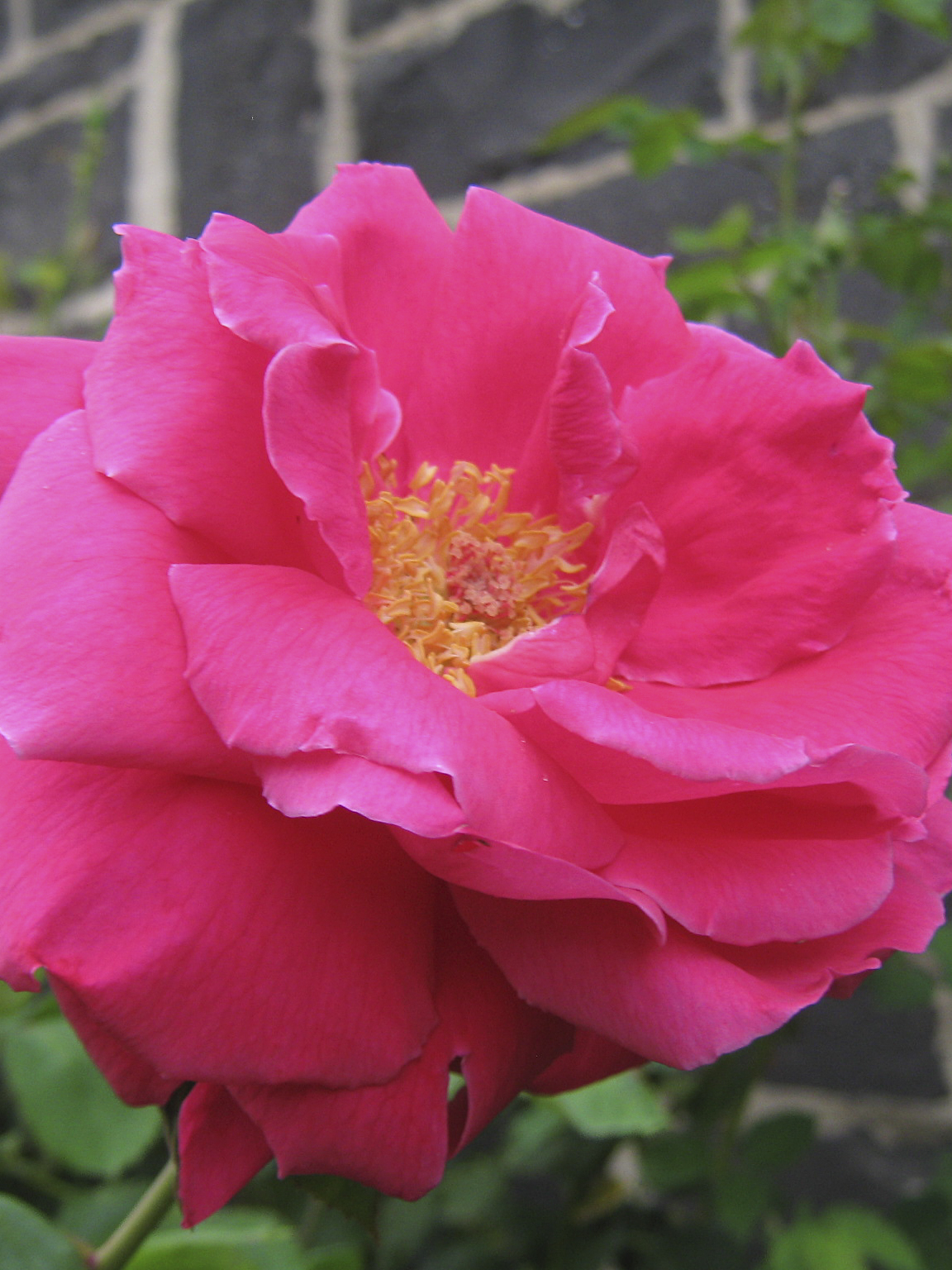
'Janet Morrison' 1936, Hybrid Tea. Scottish-born Elizabeth Janet Morrison (1865–1945) was married to a prominent Melbourne gynecologist.

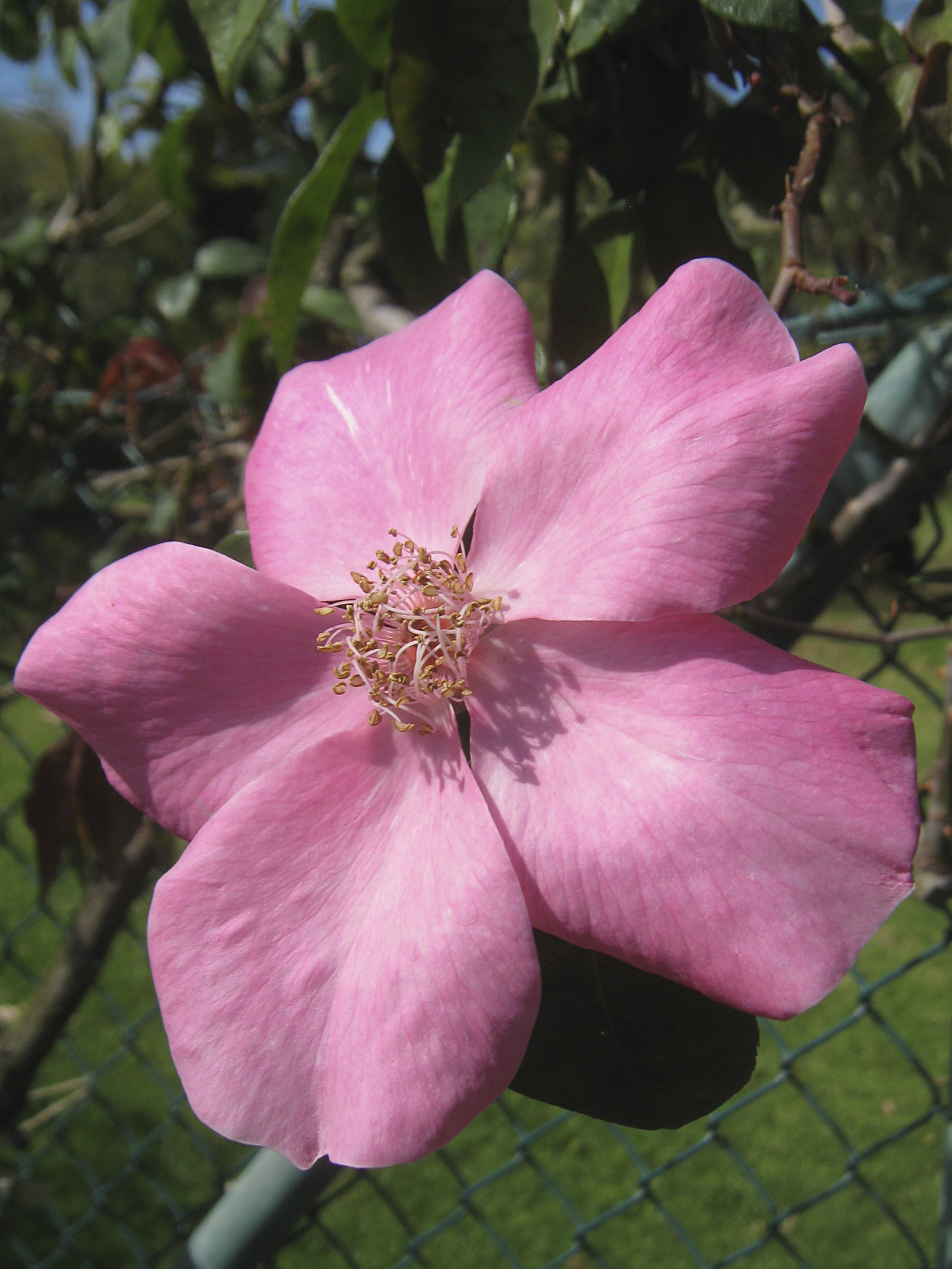
'Jessie Clark' 1915, Hybrid Gigantea. Lady Jessie Johnston (1889–1984) was Alister Clark's niece. Her rose was his first seedling from Rosa gigantea and his first great success as a breeder.

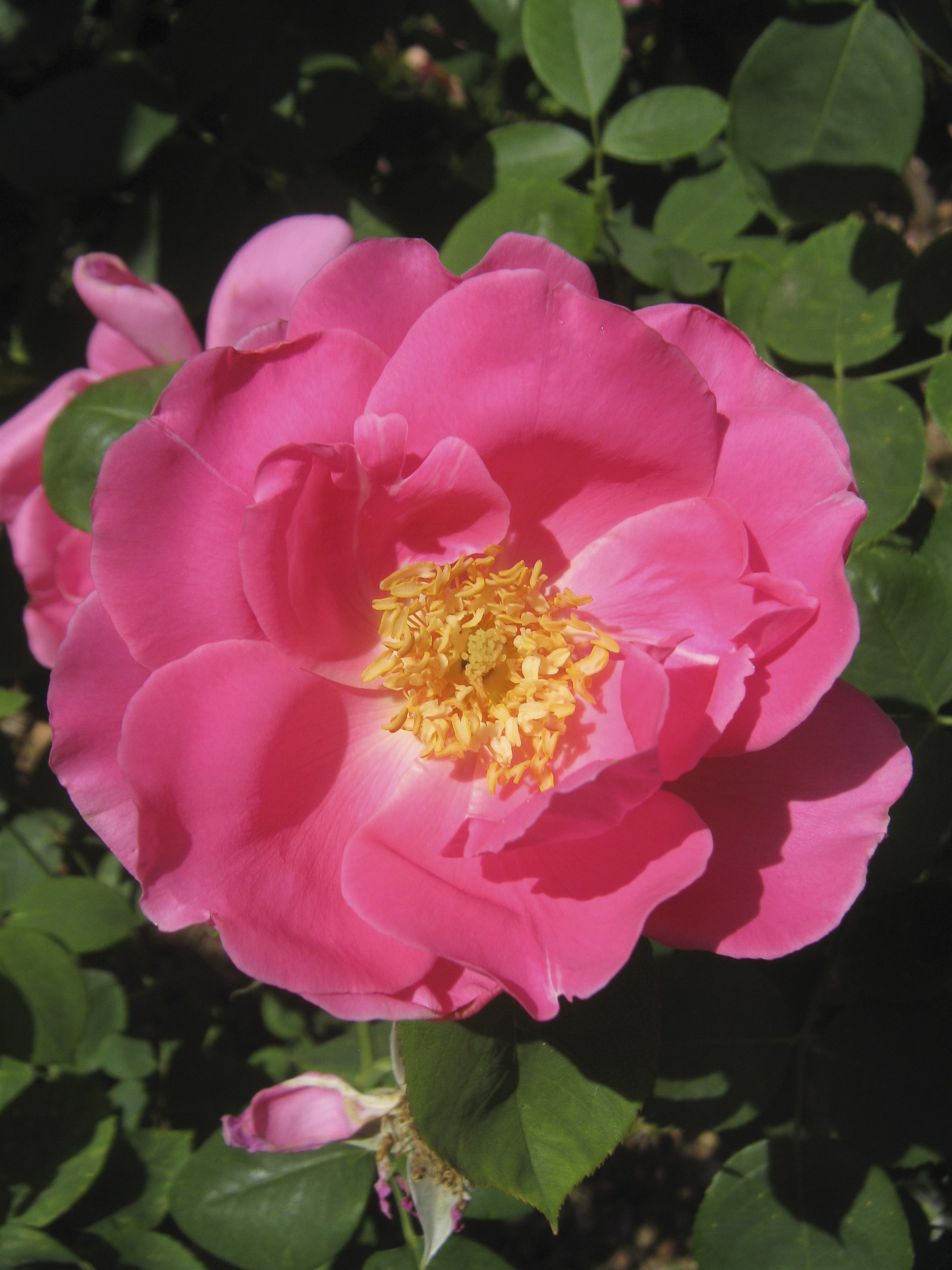
'Kitty Kininmonth' 1922, Hybrid Gigantea climber. Kitty Kininmonth (1893–1933) came from a Western District family who have grown her rose since it was named for her.

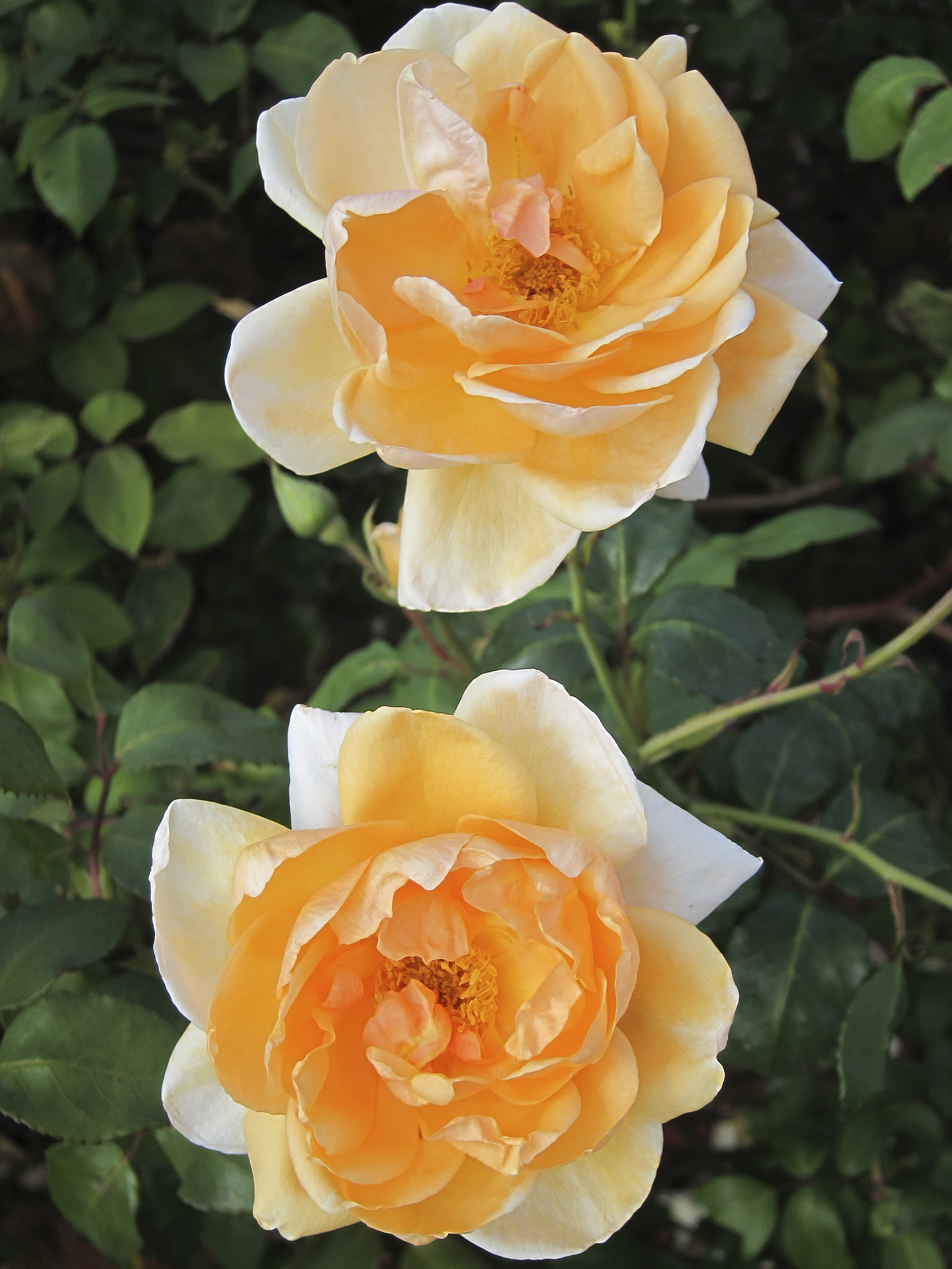
'Lady Huntingfield' 1937, Hybrid Tea. Margaret Crosby was a New York judge's daughter who married the Australian-born Baron Huntingfield. He was Governor of Victoria 1933–1939.

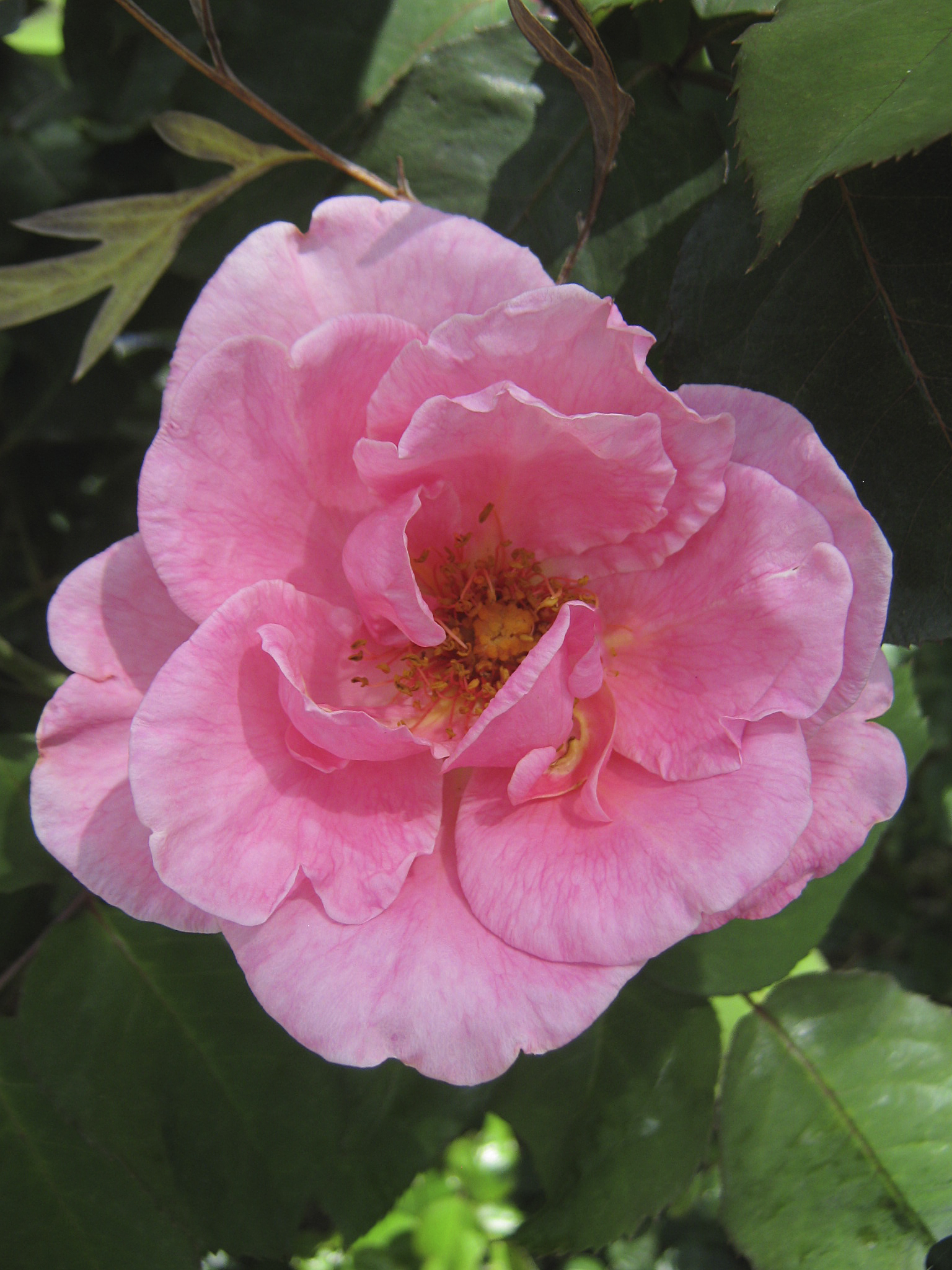
'Lady Mann' 1940, Hybrid Gigantea. Adeline Mary Raleigh (1884–1957), a farmer's daughter, married a barrister who became Sir Frederick Mann, Chief Justice of Victoria.

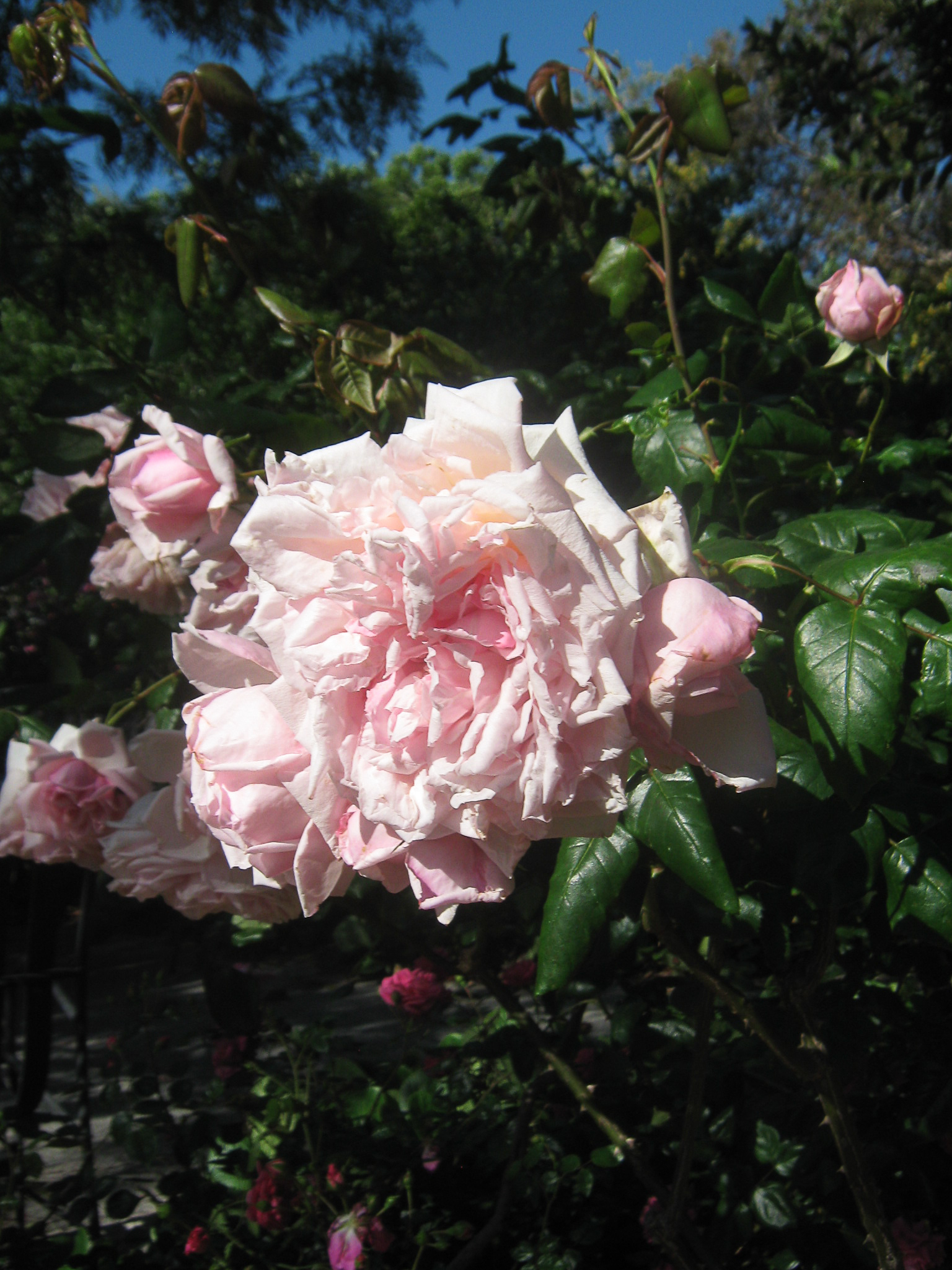
'Lady Medallist' 1912, Hybrid Tea climber. The first rose Clark released to the public. Lady Medallist was a racehorse.

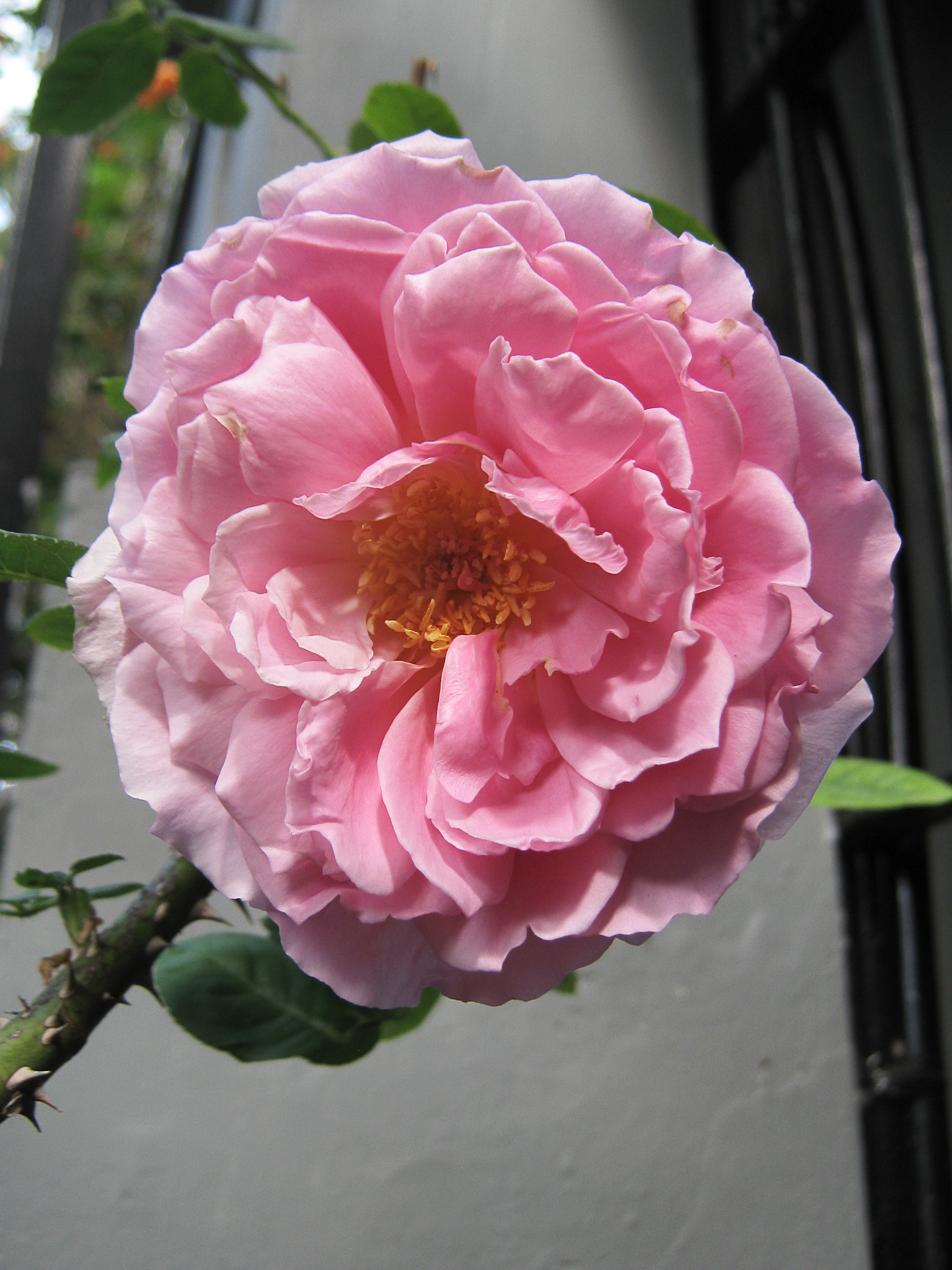
'Lady Somers' 1930, Hybrid Gigantea. Beautiful flowers too big for their bush. Lord Somers was Governor of Victoria 1926–1931. Lady Somers (Daisy Finola Meeking, 1896–1981) was a pioneer aviator who ended her long career as Chief Guide of the British Empire.

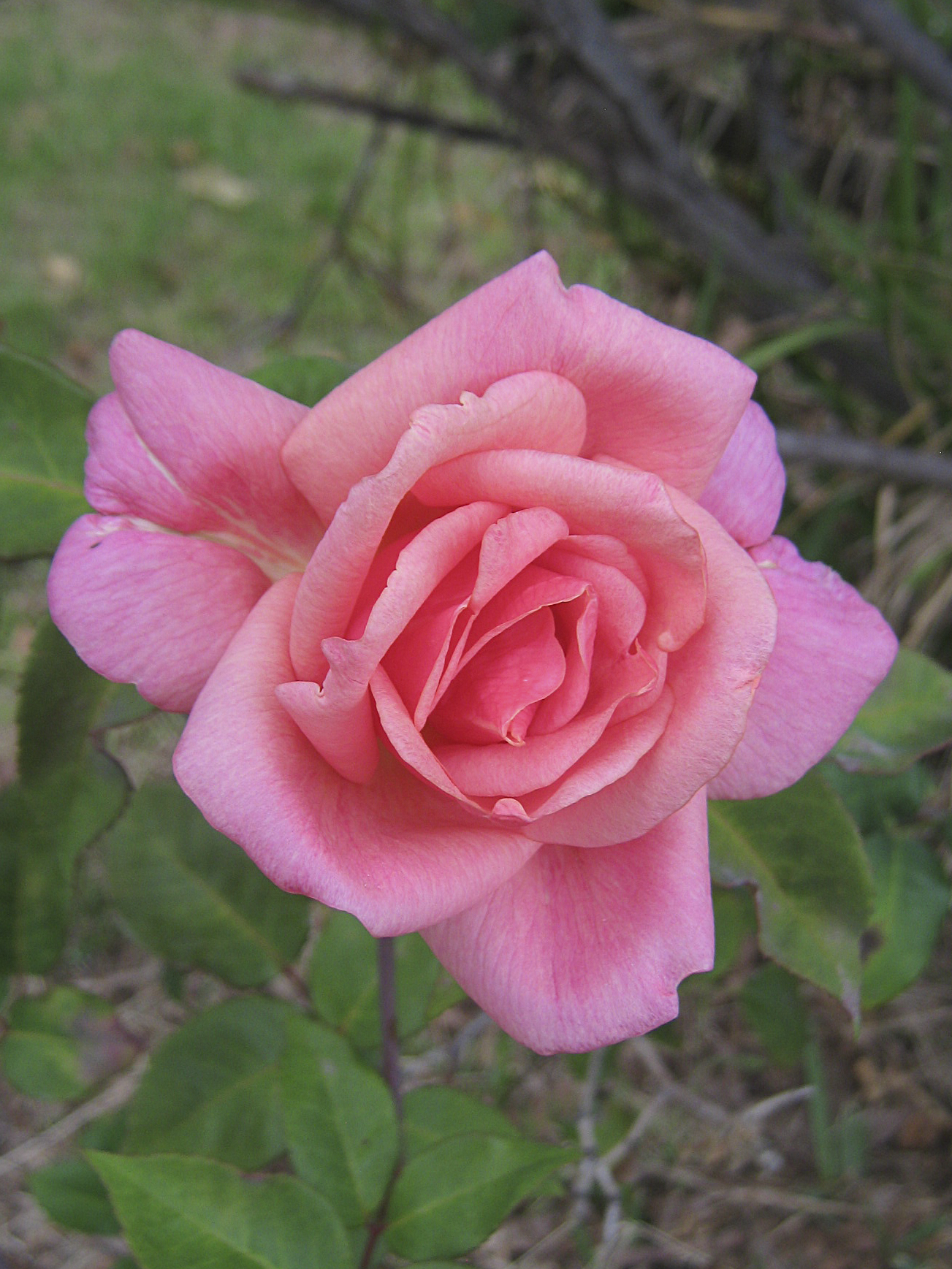
'Lorraine Lee' 1924, Hybrid Gigantea. Proportionately the most popular rose ever grown in Australia; thousands of plants remain. Lorraine Lee was a distant cousin of the Clarks' who came on a visit.

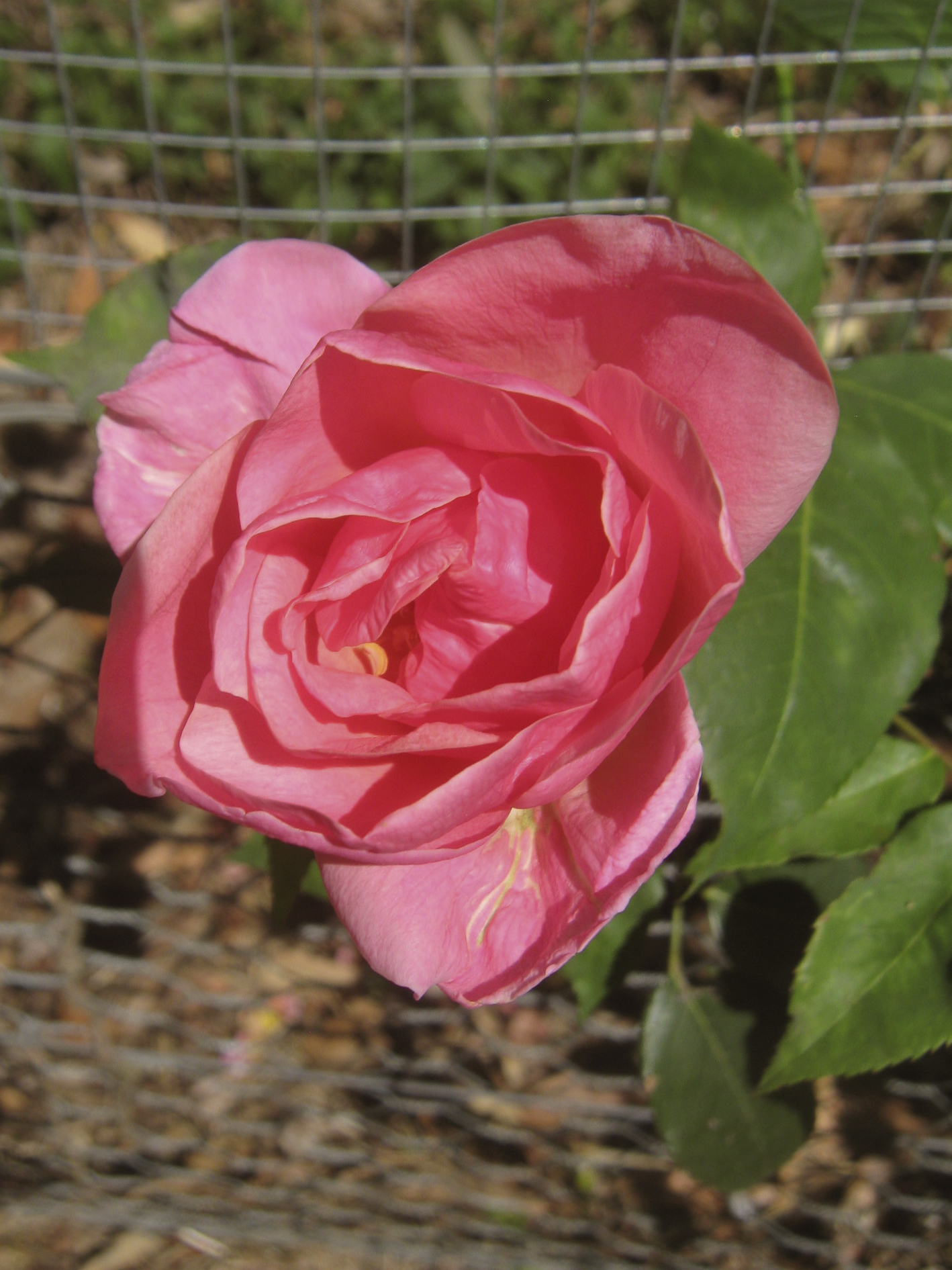
'Lorraine Lee climbing' 1932, strong Hybrid Gigantea climber. Sport of 'Lorraine Lee' discovered in 1932.

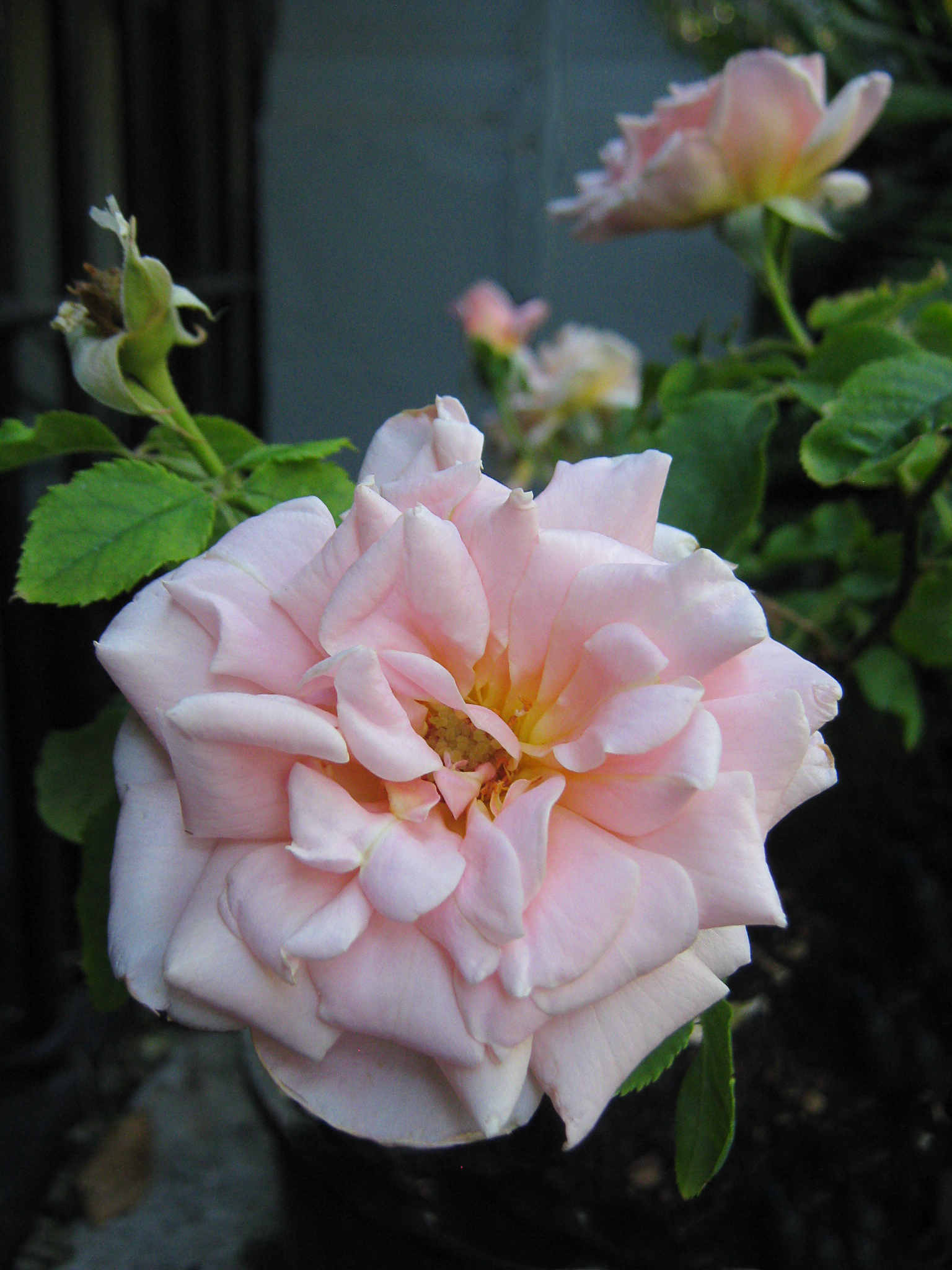
'Mab Griwade' small Hybrid Tea, 1937. Mabel Kelly (1887–1973) was married to Sir Russell Grimwade, chemist, industrialist and philanthropist. They had a big garden at Westerfield near Baxter, Victoria (see 'Baxter Beauty').

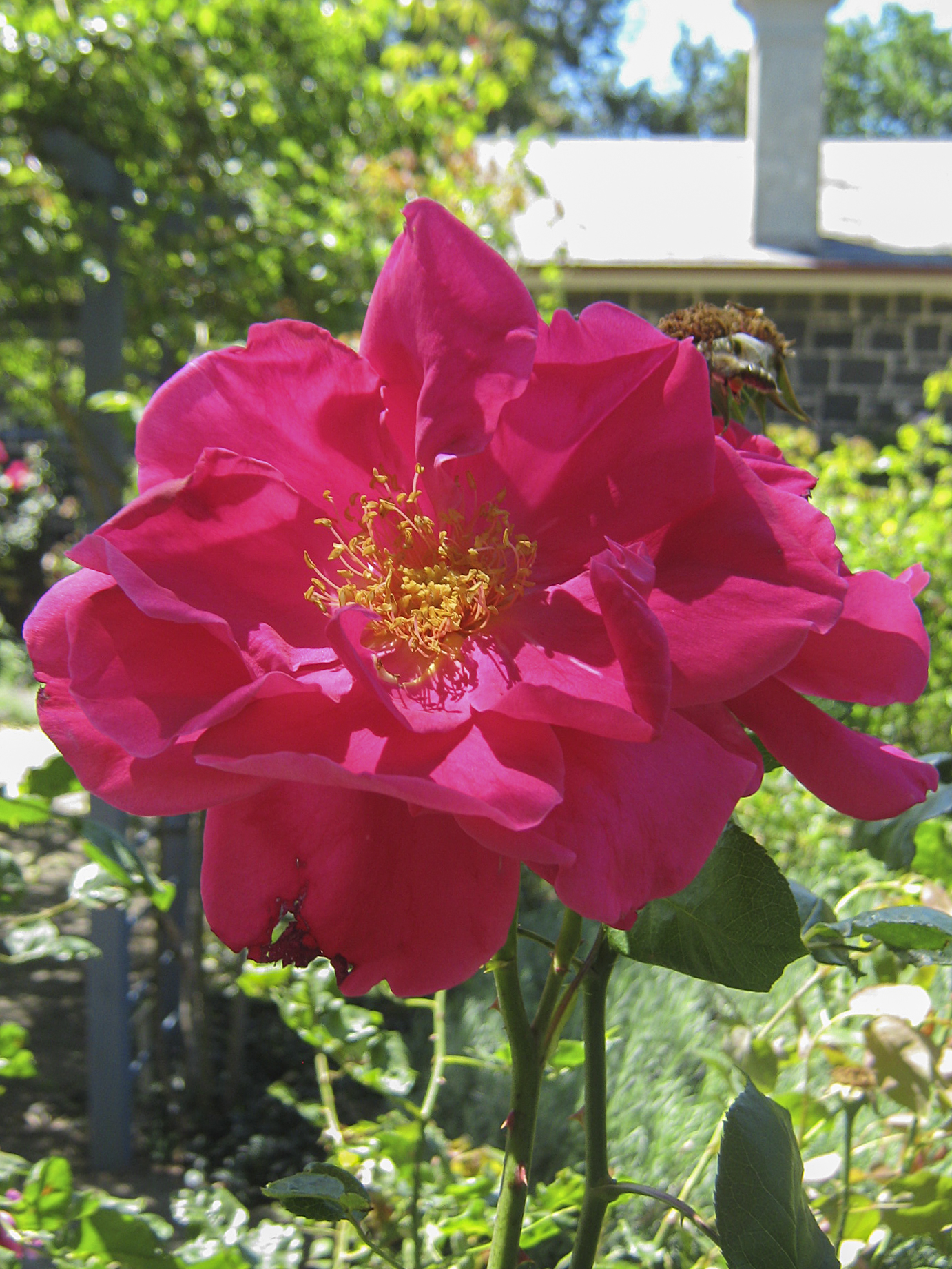
'Madge Taylor' 1930, Hybrid Tea. Madge Taylor (1903–1988) grew up on a big sheep and cattle station at Keilor, Victoria. She and her father shared golfing and hunting interests with the Clarks.

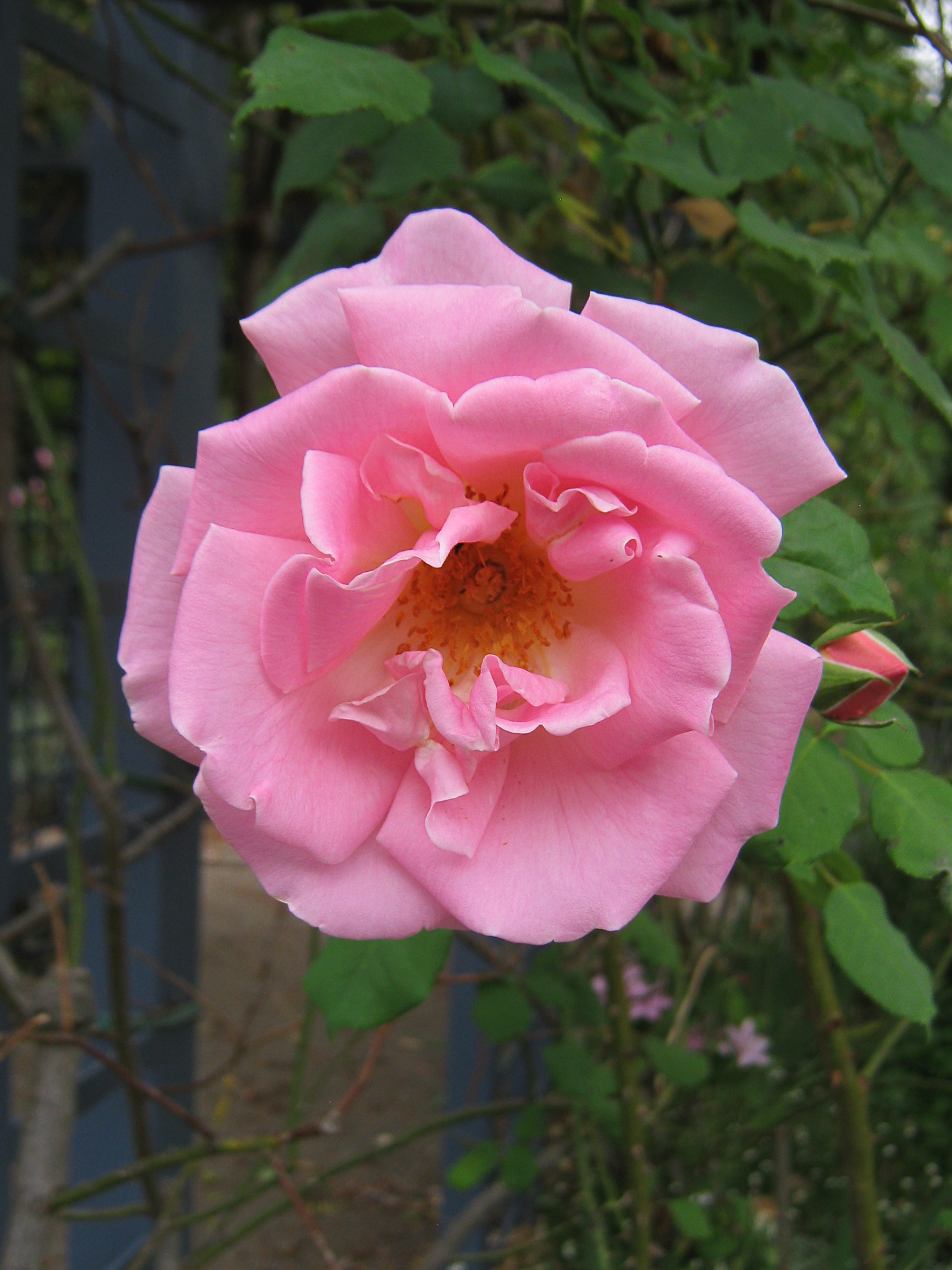
'Margaret Turnbull' 1931, Hybrid Tea climber. Margaret Turnbull (1867–1953) was the daughter of a Scots storekeeper who became a Victorian Member of Parliament. Never married, she was a friend of the Clarks for over fifty years.

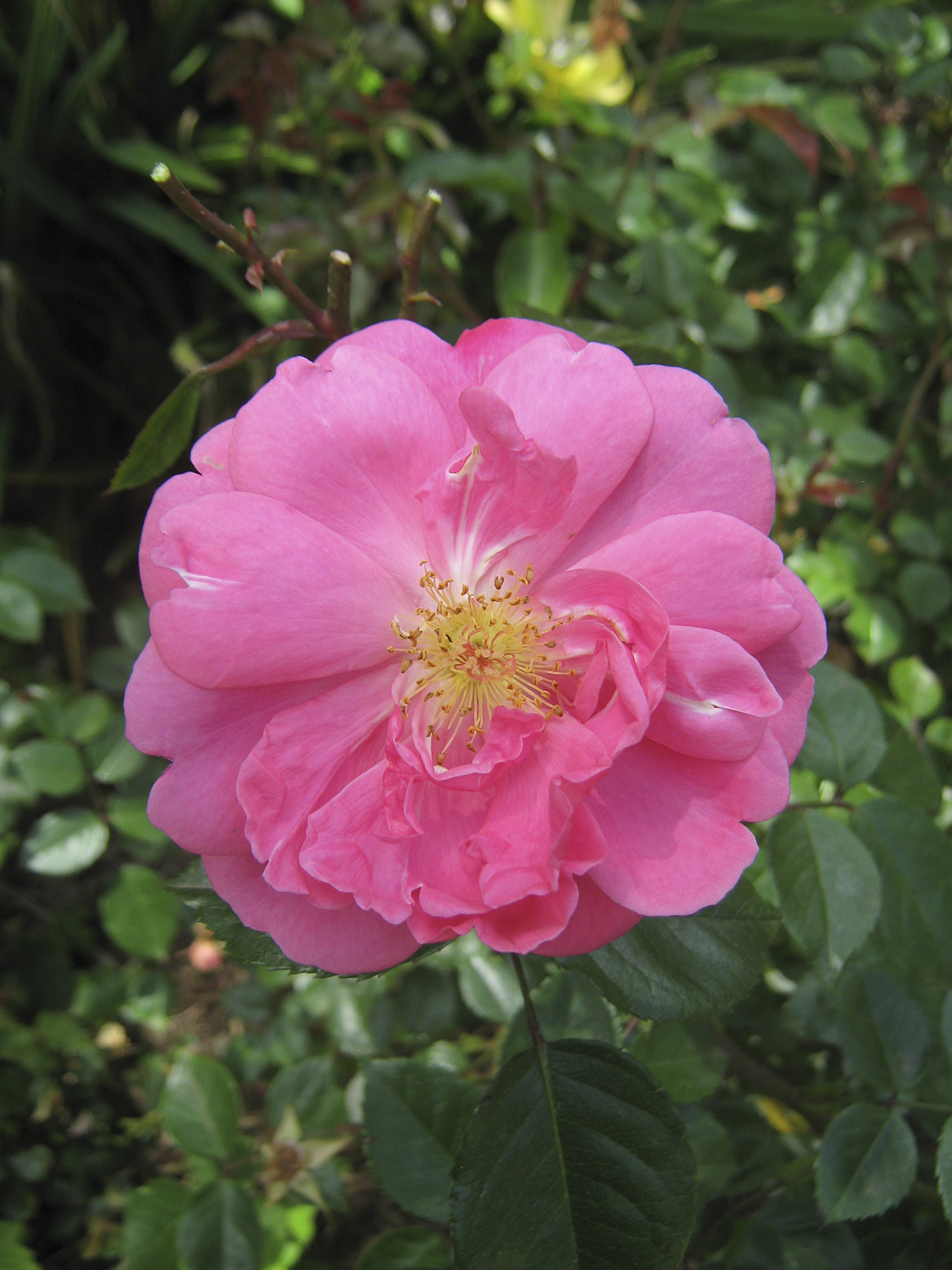
'Marjory Palmer' 1936, Polyantha. Marjory Staughton (1881–1968) married the polo-playing stock-and-station agent Claude Palmer. The Palmers and Staughtons knew the Clarks well.

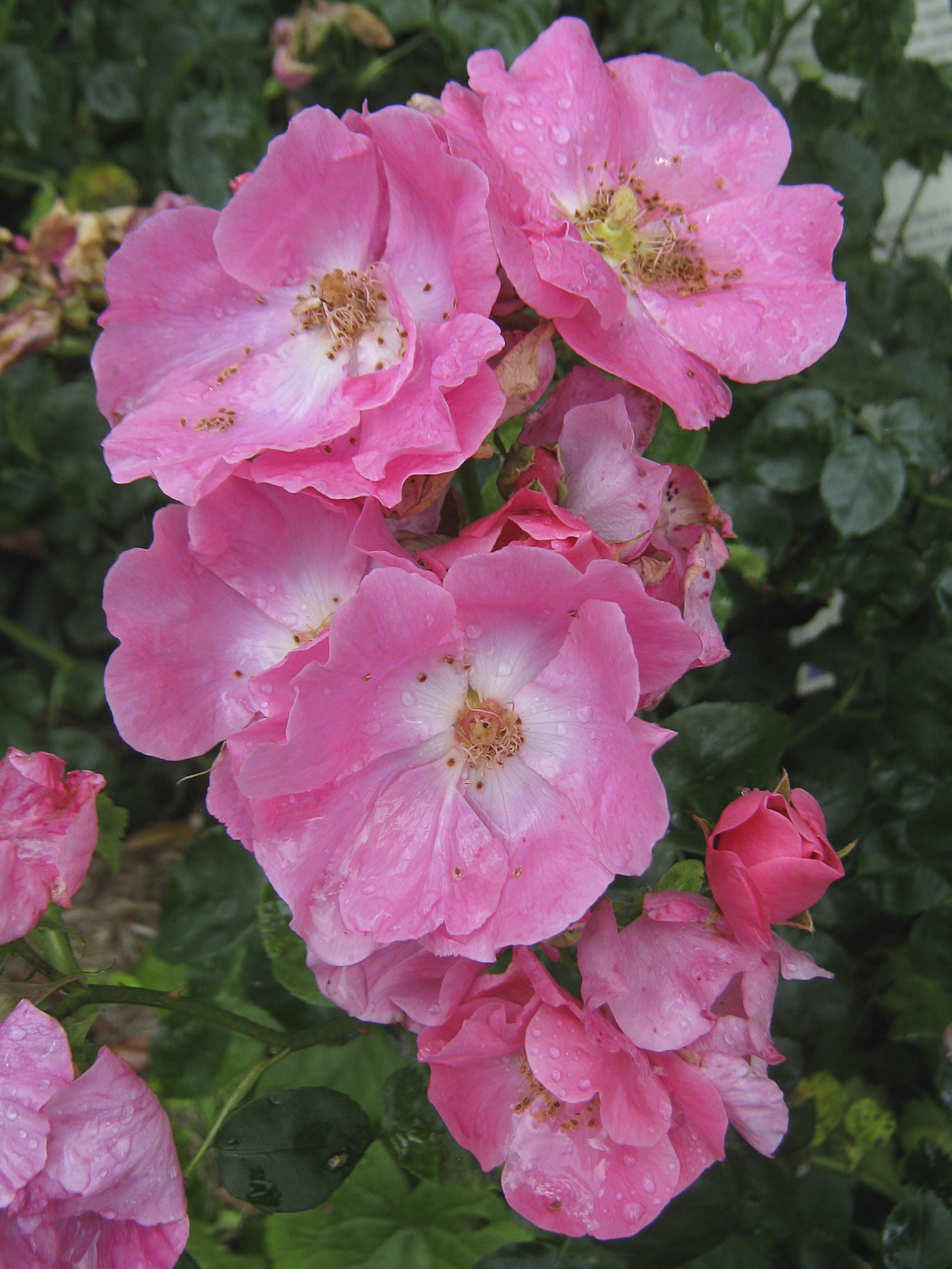
'Mary Guthrie' 1929, Polyantha. Mary Guthrie (1915–1990) was the daughter of a Victorian farmer and Senator, and a mother from a family of New Zealand graziers.

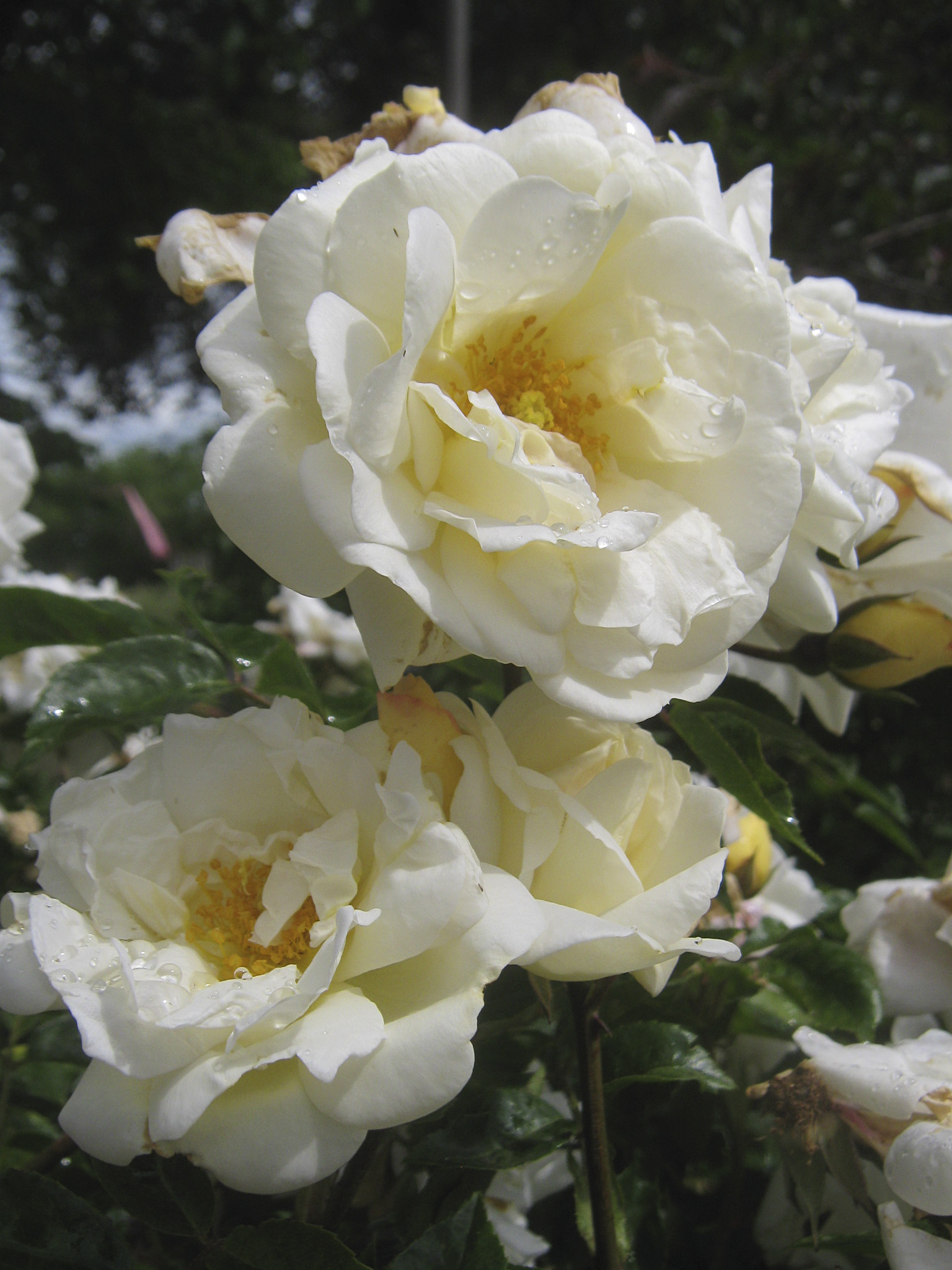
'Milkmaid 1925, Noisette. Recurrent flowering. Aptly smells of milk and honey.

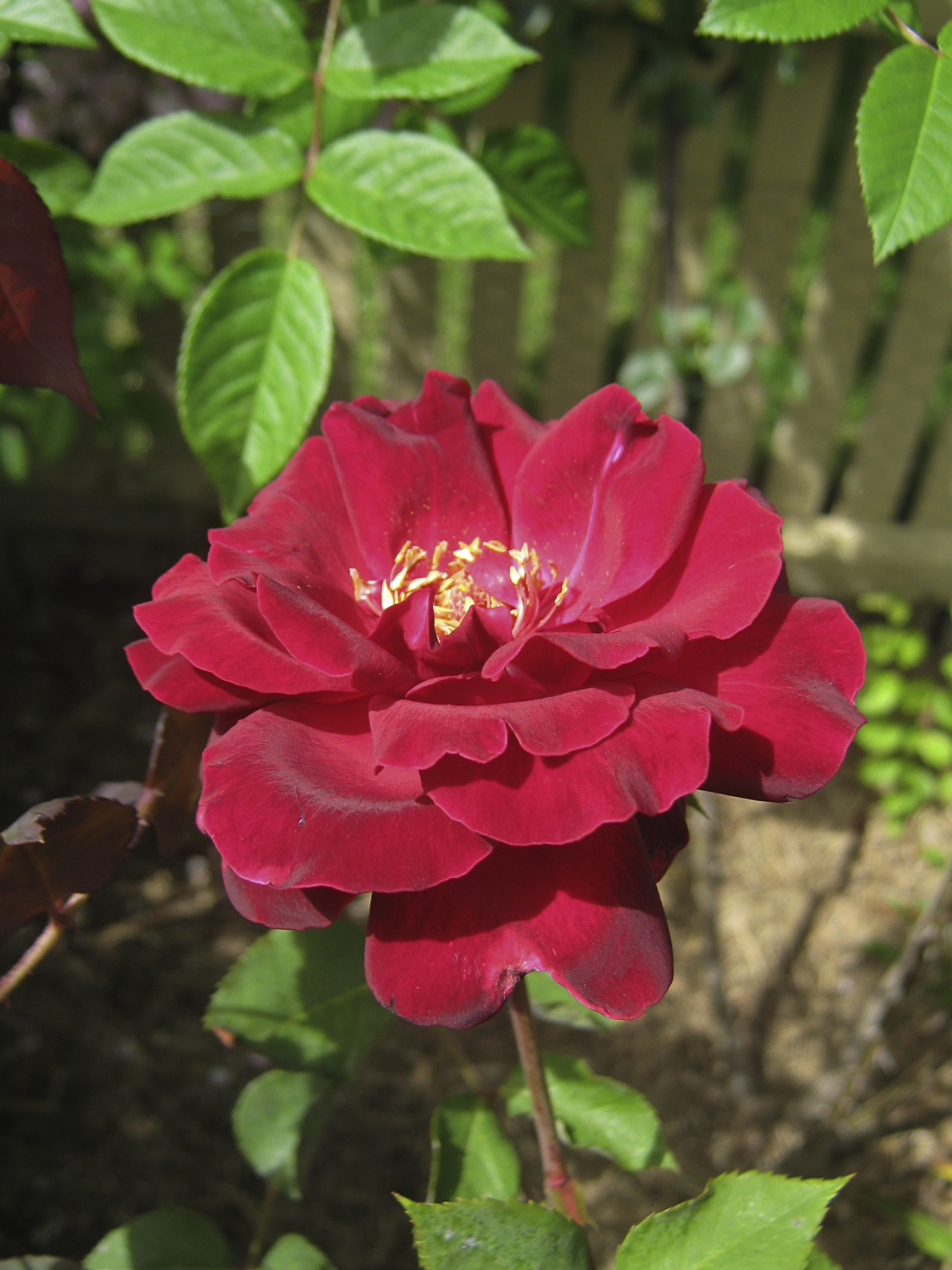
'Mrs Albert Nash' 1929, Hybrid Tea. Maud, Mrs Albert Nash (1862–1943) and her family were among the Clarks' closest friends. Her rose burns in hot sun, so looks better in autumn.

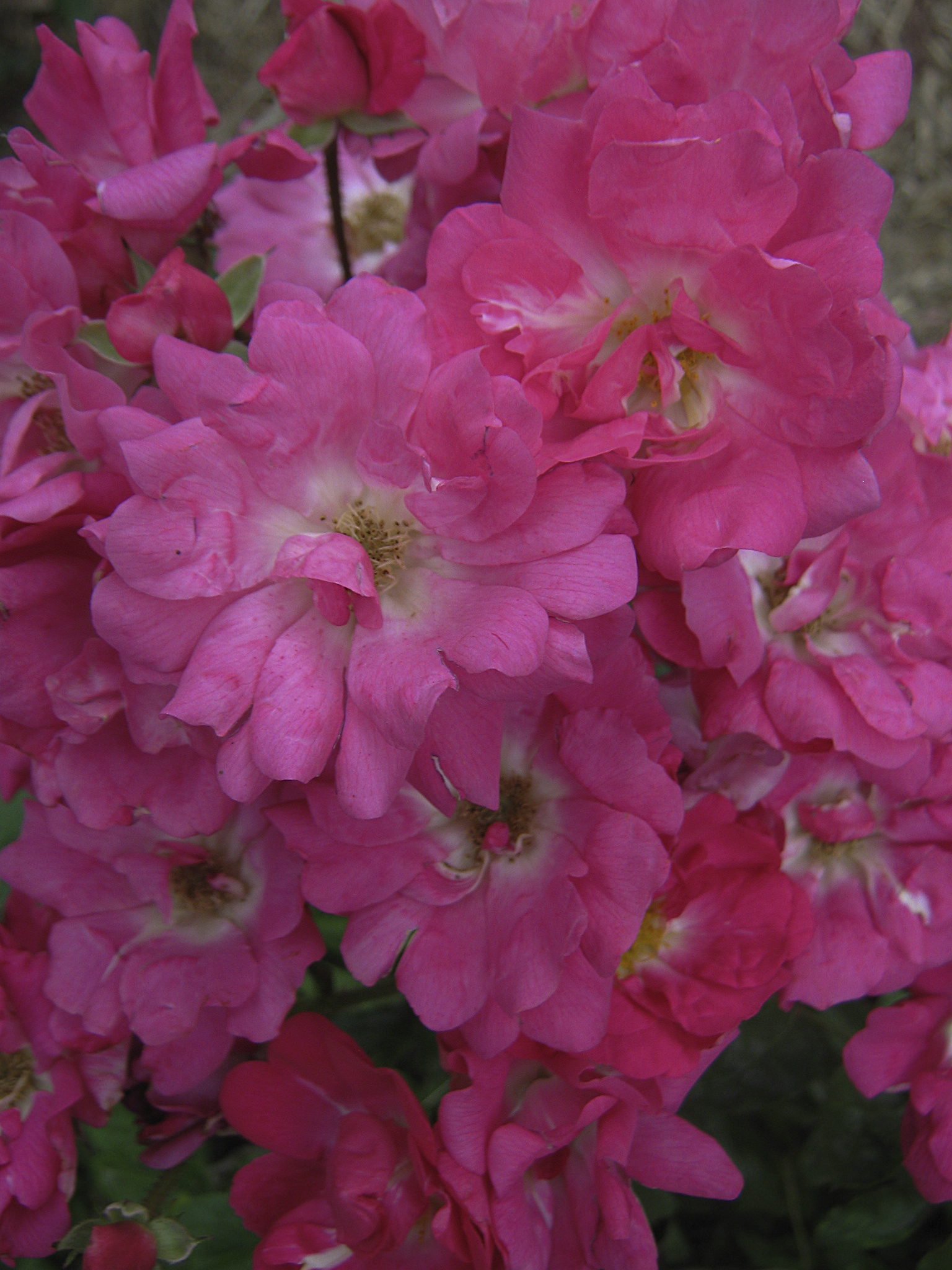
'Mrs Alston's rose' 1940, dwarf Polyantha. Maude and Tom Alston had a place at Oaklands and were presented with this unregistered rose on a casual visit from Clark.

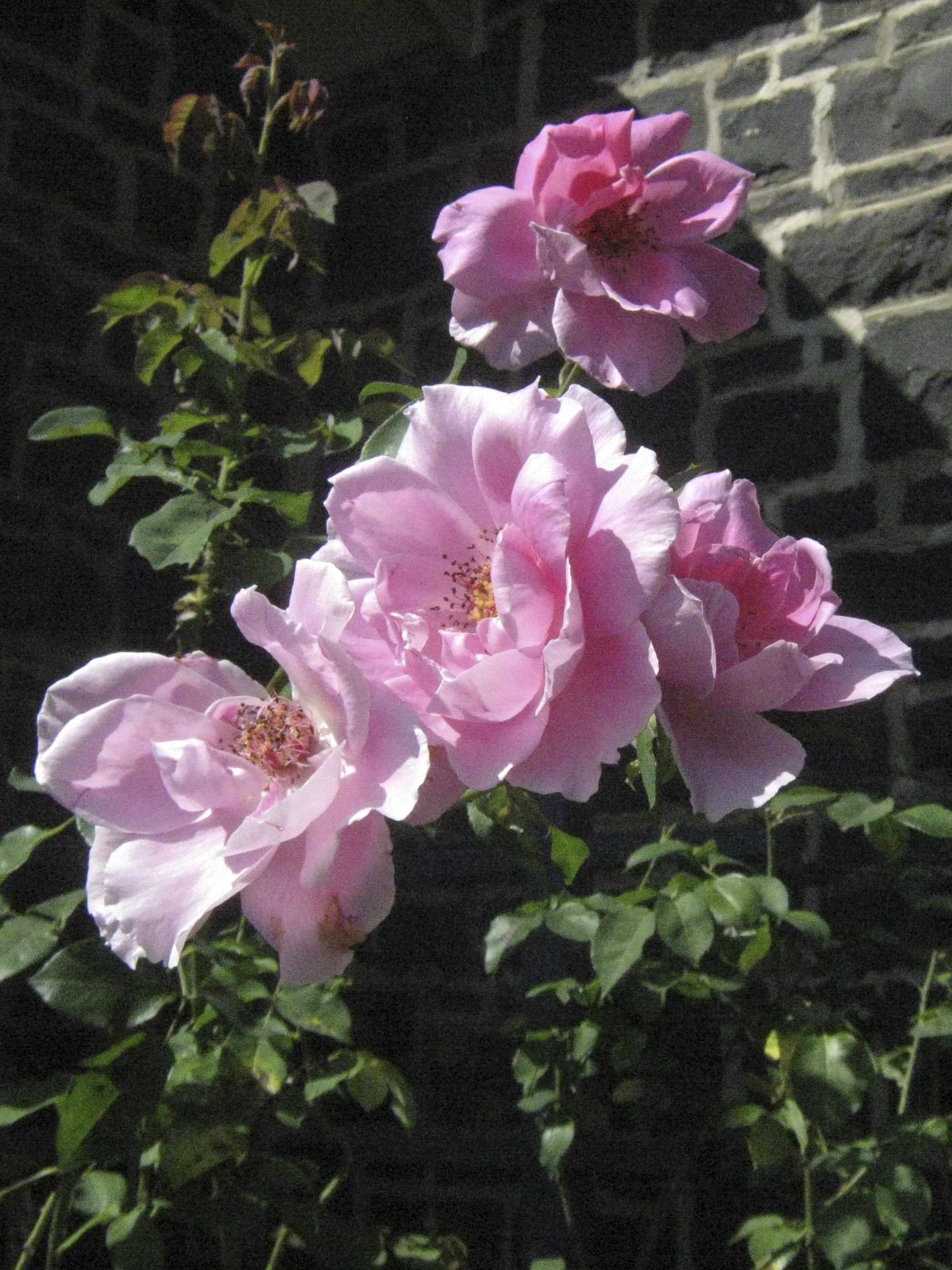
'Mrs Fred Danks' 1951, Hybrid Tea. Dorothy and Fred Danks were plant fanciers in Canterbury, Victoria and friends of Clark, who often brought them plants to try out.

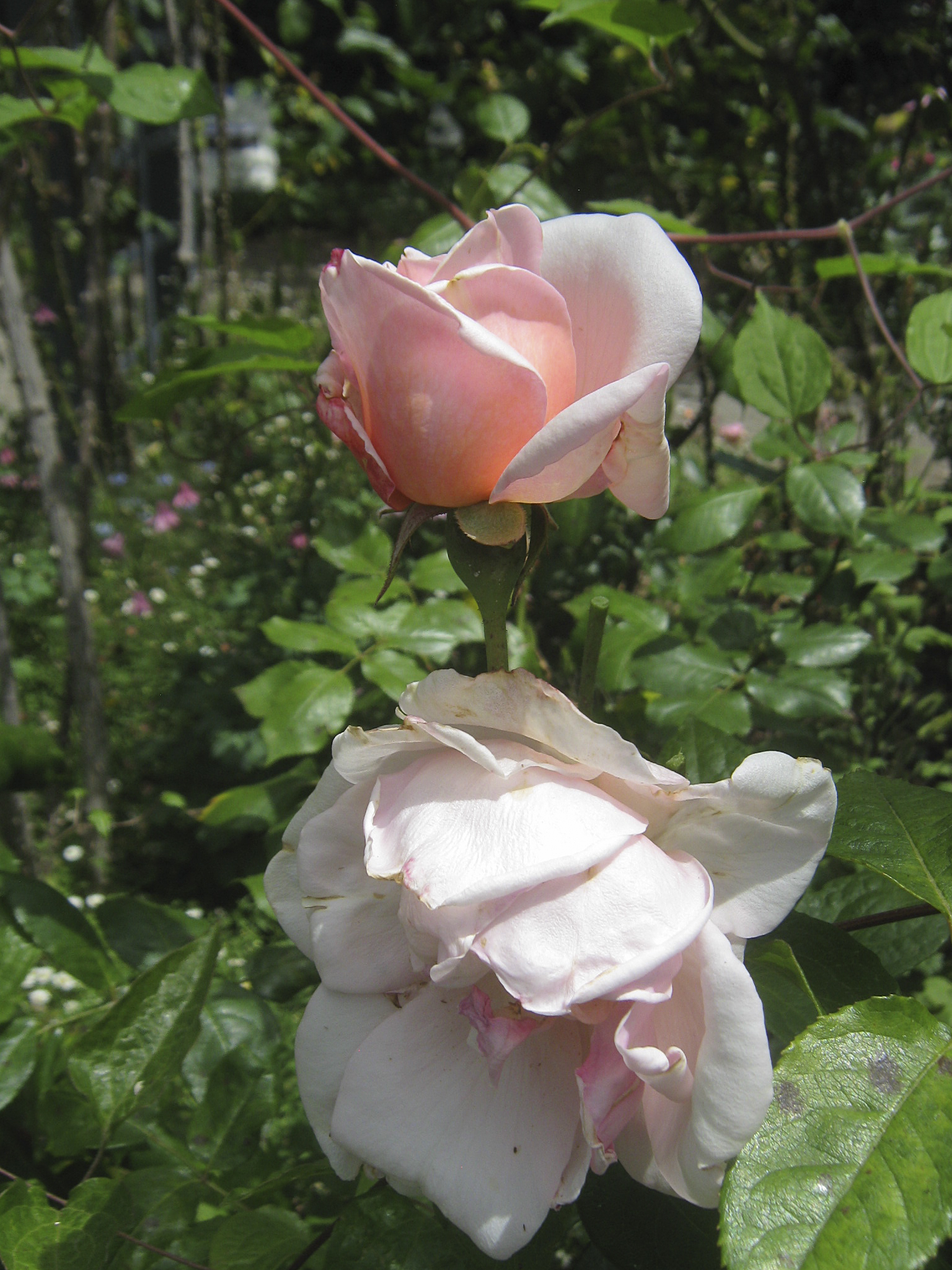
'Mrs Harold Alston' 1940, Hybrid Tea. The Scottish-born Elizabeth Stewart (1910–1963) was married to Harold Alston, a gardening journalist. They had a garden at Diamond Creek which included many Alister Clark originals.

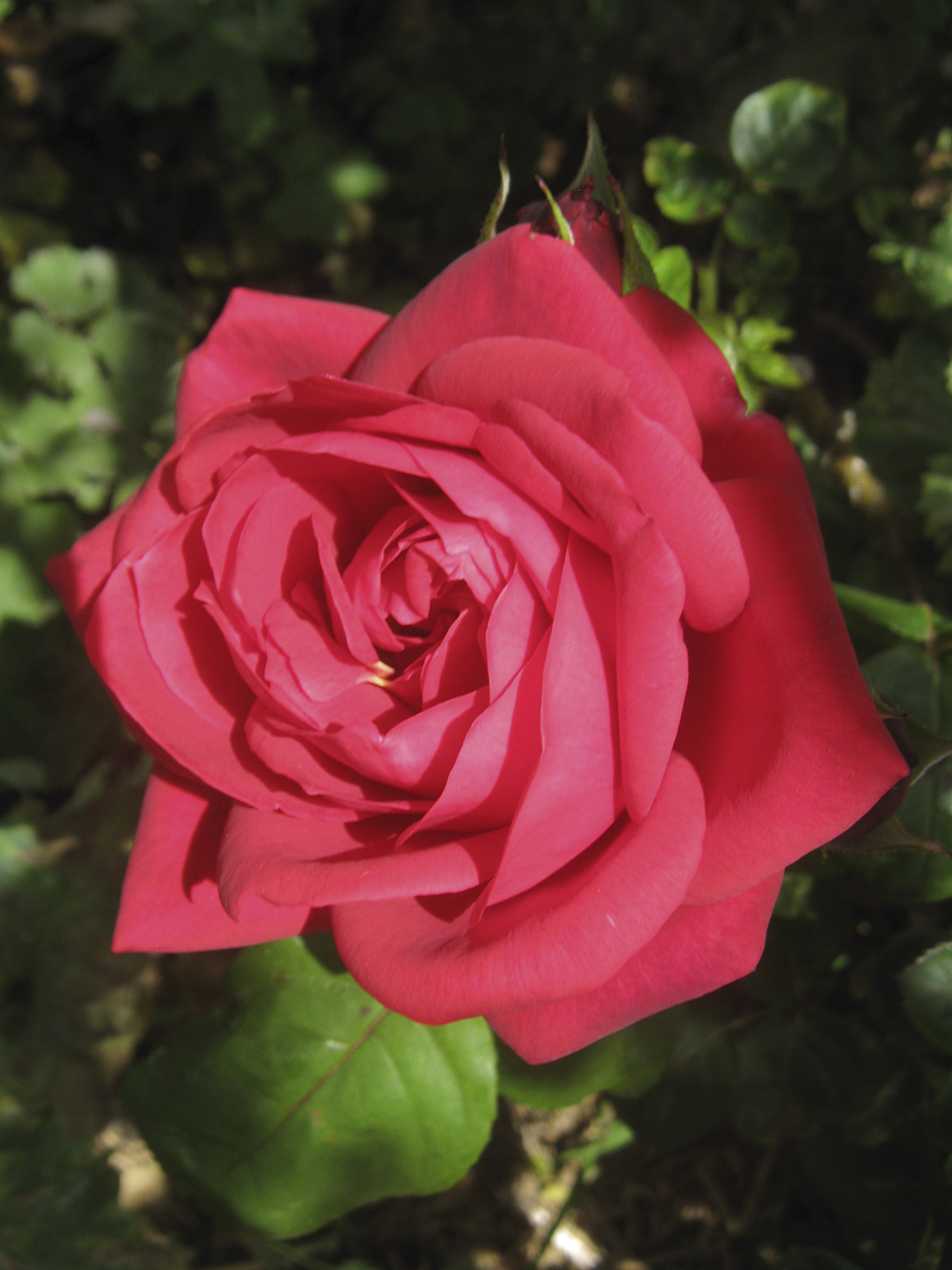
'Mrs Harold Brookes' 1931, Hybrid Tea. Dorothy Bird married a polo-playing stock-and-station agent, Harold Brookes, who knew Alister Clark. Together they created a six-acre garden north of Woodend, Victoria.

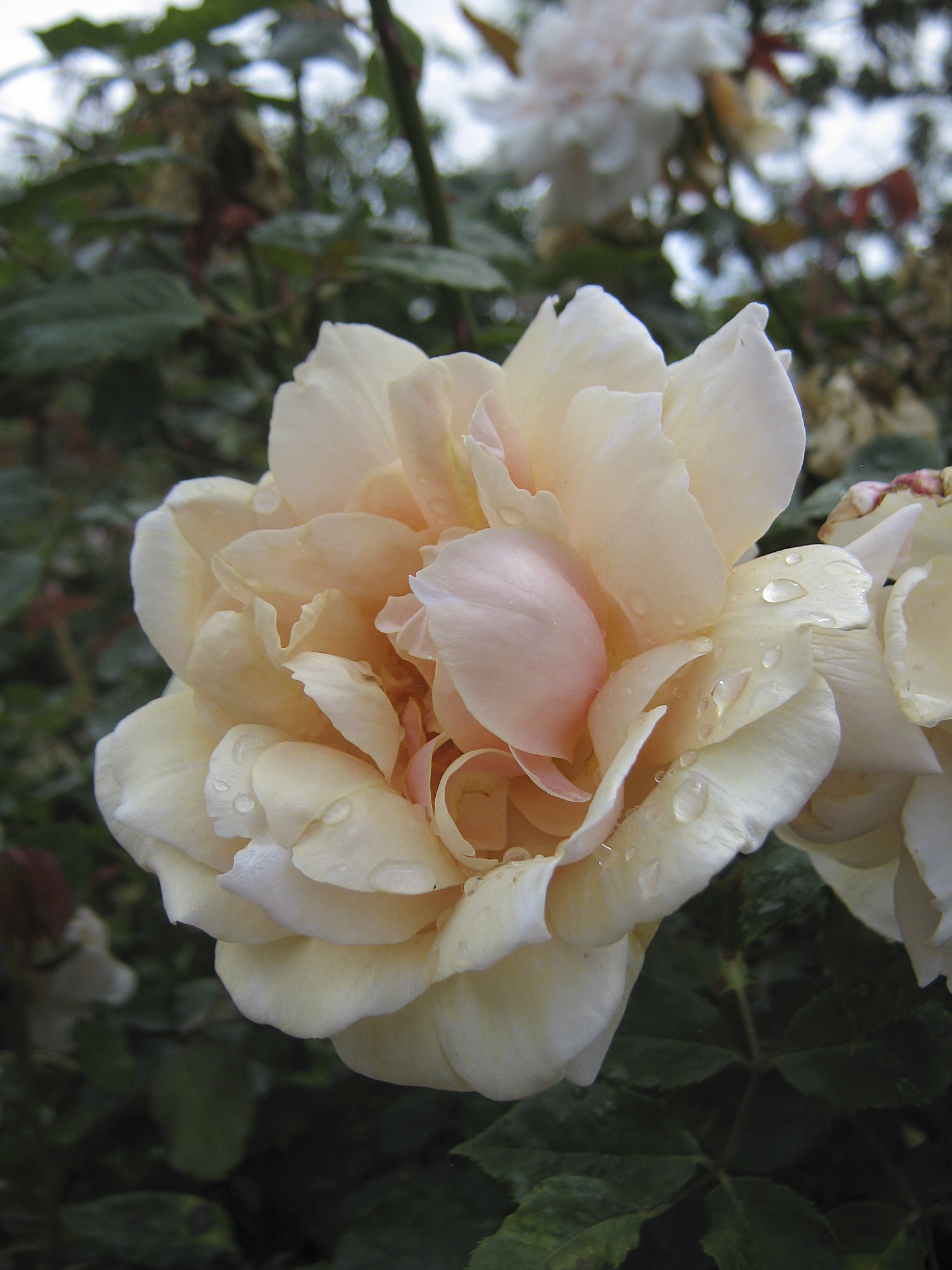
'Mrs Hugh Dettmann' 1930, Hybrid Gigantea with big orange hips in autumn. The Dettmanns were daffodil and rose fanciers with a large garden at Kyneton, Victoria in which Clark liked to try out new varieties.

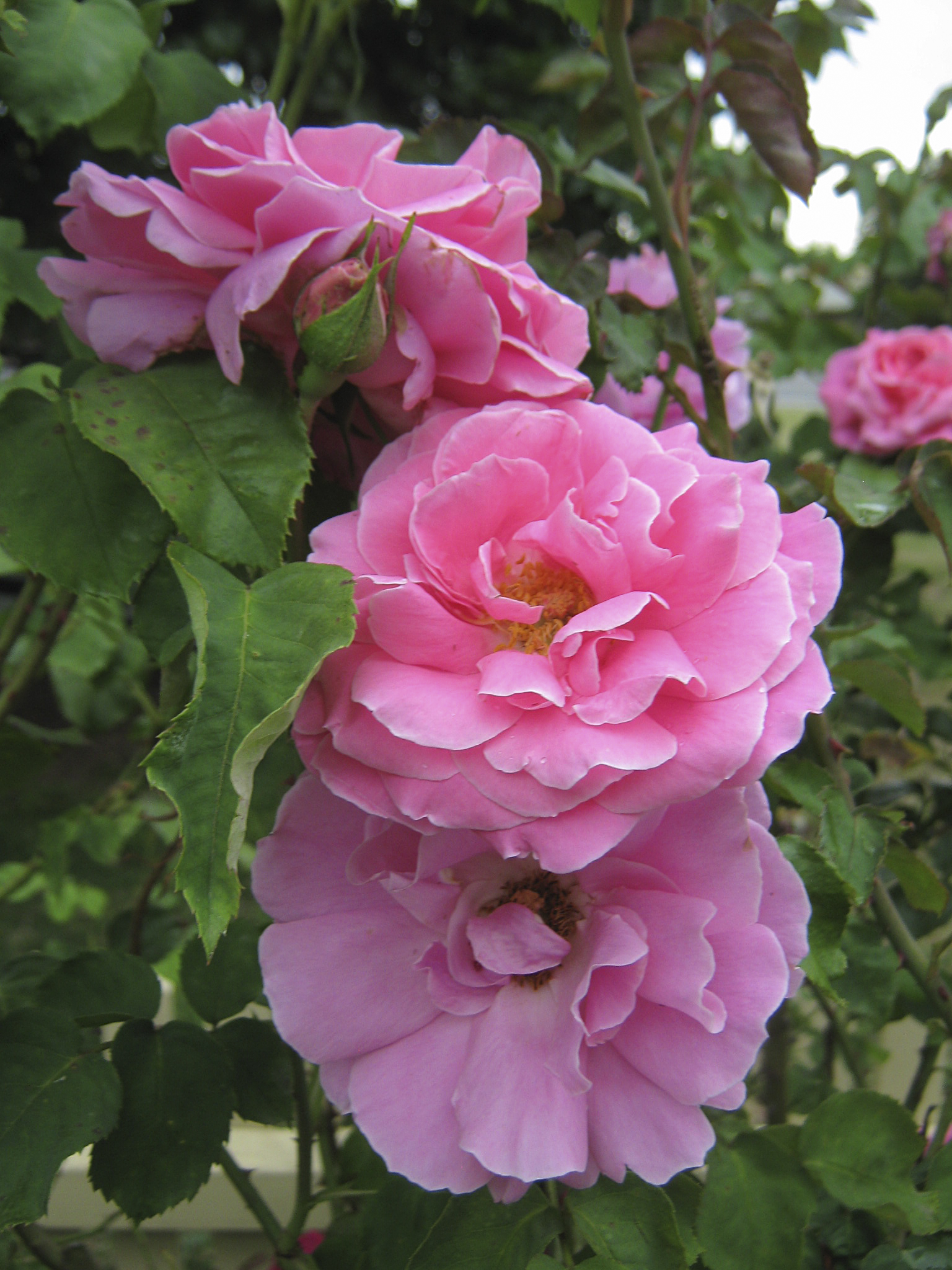
'Mrs Norman Watson' 1930 Hybrid Tea climber. Susan Wood (1883–1951) was the daughter of a Creswick farm worker. She and her husband were rose and garden enthusiasts in Geelong who eventually ran a successful flower shop there.

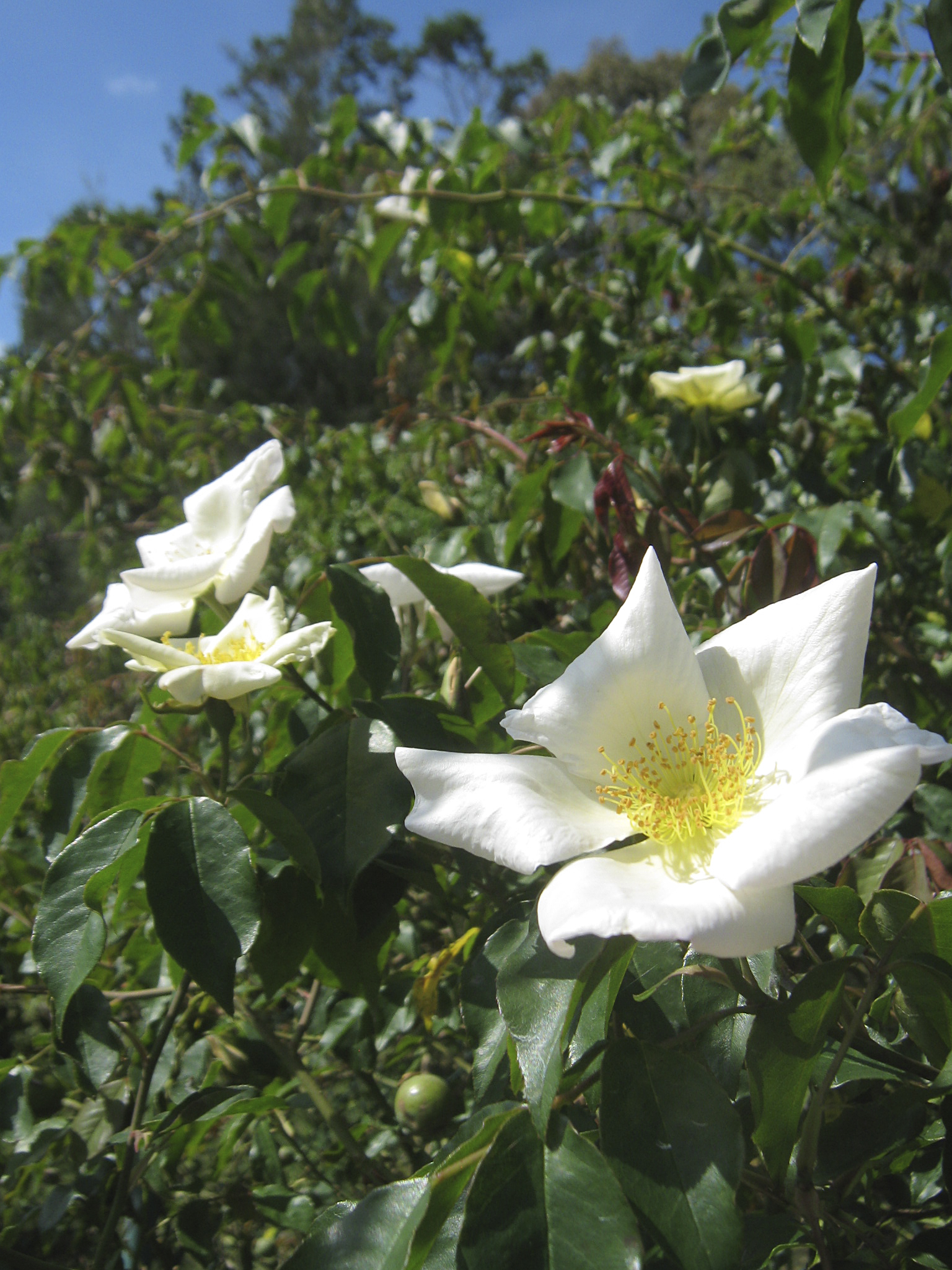
'Mrs Richard Turnbull' 1945, Hybrid Gigantea climber. Emily Mackay and her husband Richard Turnbull both came from Eastern Australian grazing and racing families. Their horse Sirius won the Melbourne Cup in 1944.

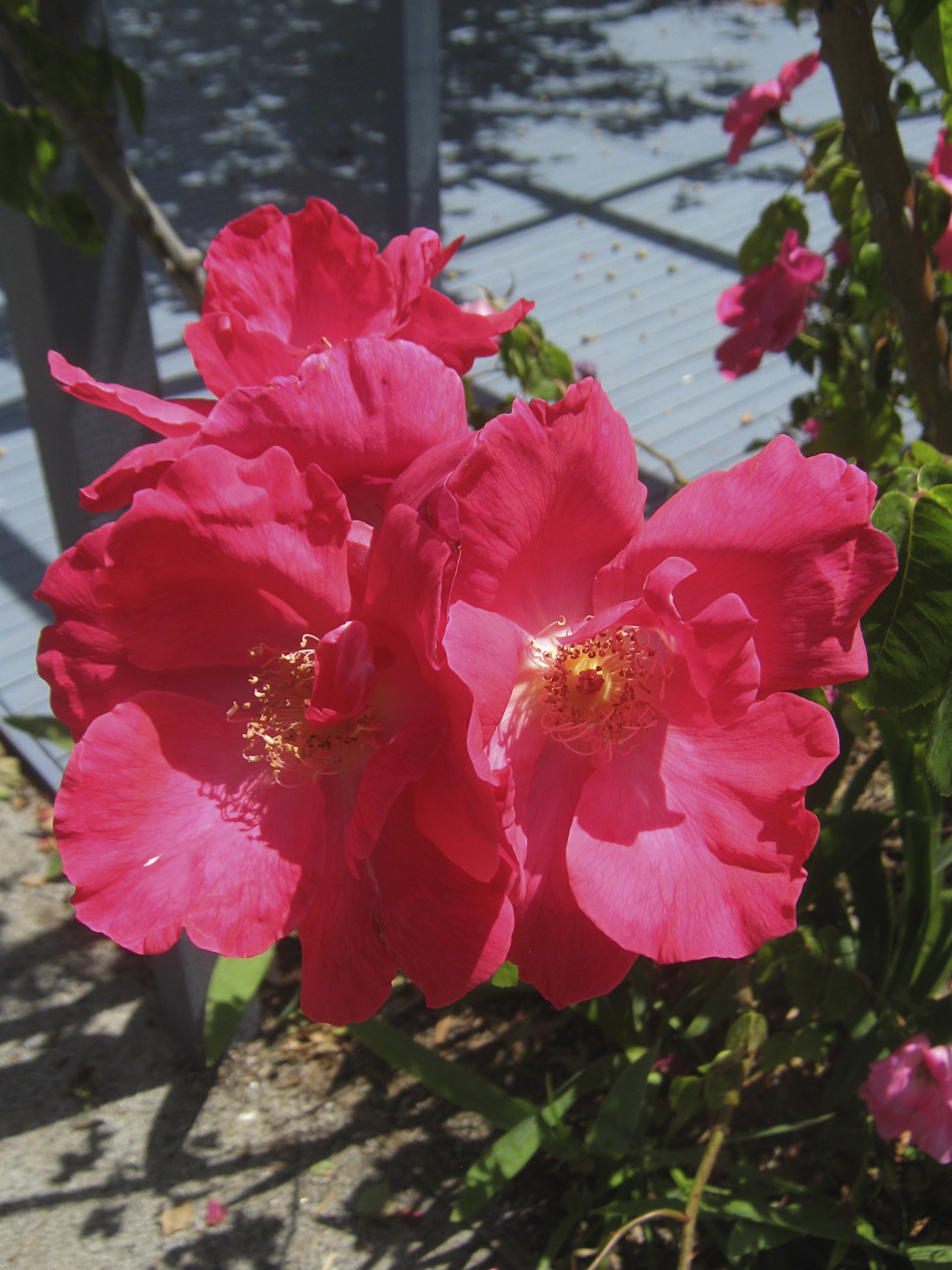
'Nancy Hayward' 1937, Hybrid Tea climber. Nancy Irvine was the daughter of a Federal Minister, later Chief Justice of Victoria. She married Ian Hayward from an Adelaide retail family. She never cared for the rose Clark named after her.

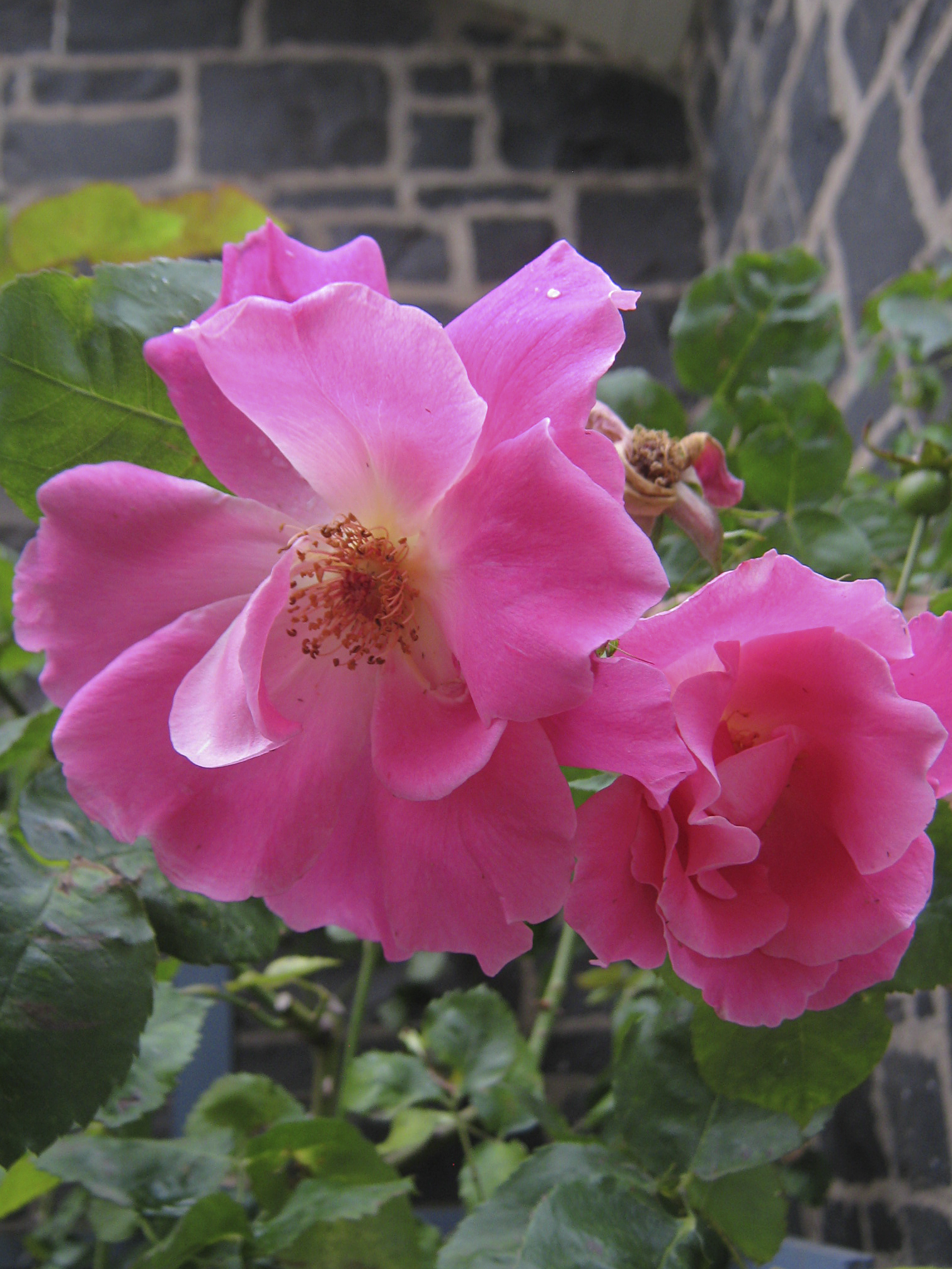
'Nora Cunningham' 1920, Hybrid Gigantea. Nora Cuningham (surname correctly spelt with one en) knew the Clarks very well as a young woman. The rose was named for her in 1920 when she married Les Austin, a Western District farmer.

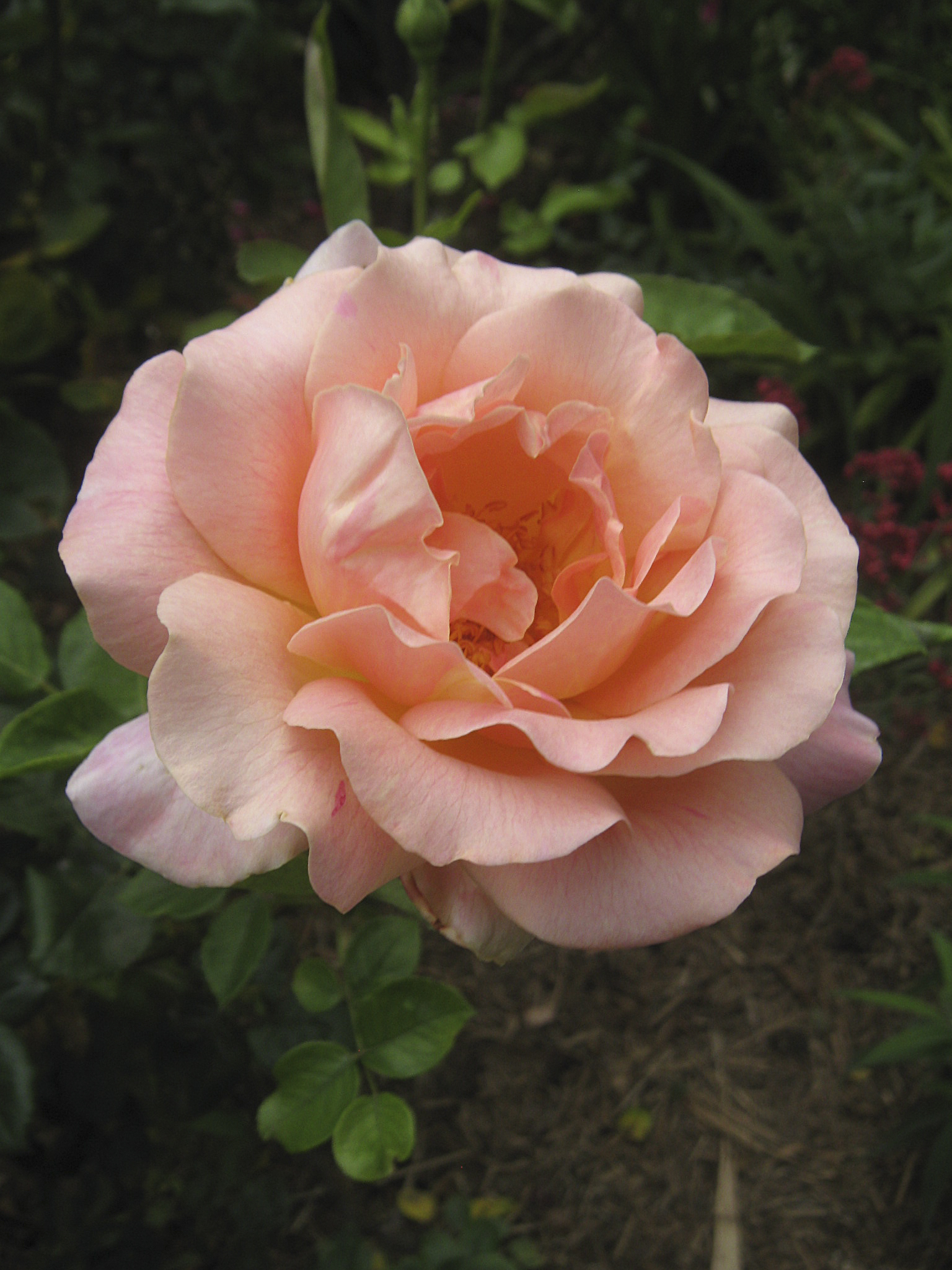
'Peggy Bell' 1928, Hybrid Tea. Peggy Bell grew up on a family property at Lilydale. After she had been to finishing school in Switzerland, she was presented with a rose by Alister Clark, a family friend, on her 21st birthday in 1929. Miss Bell did not believe this rose was the one originally dedicated to her.

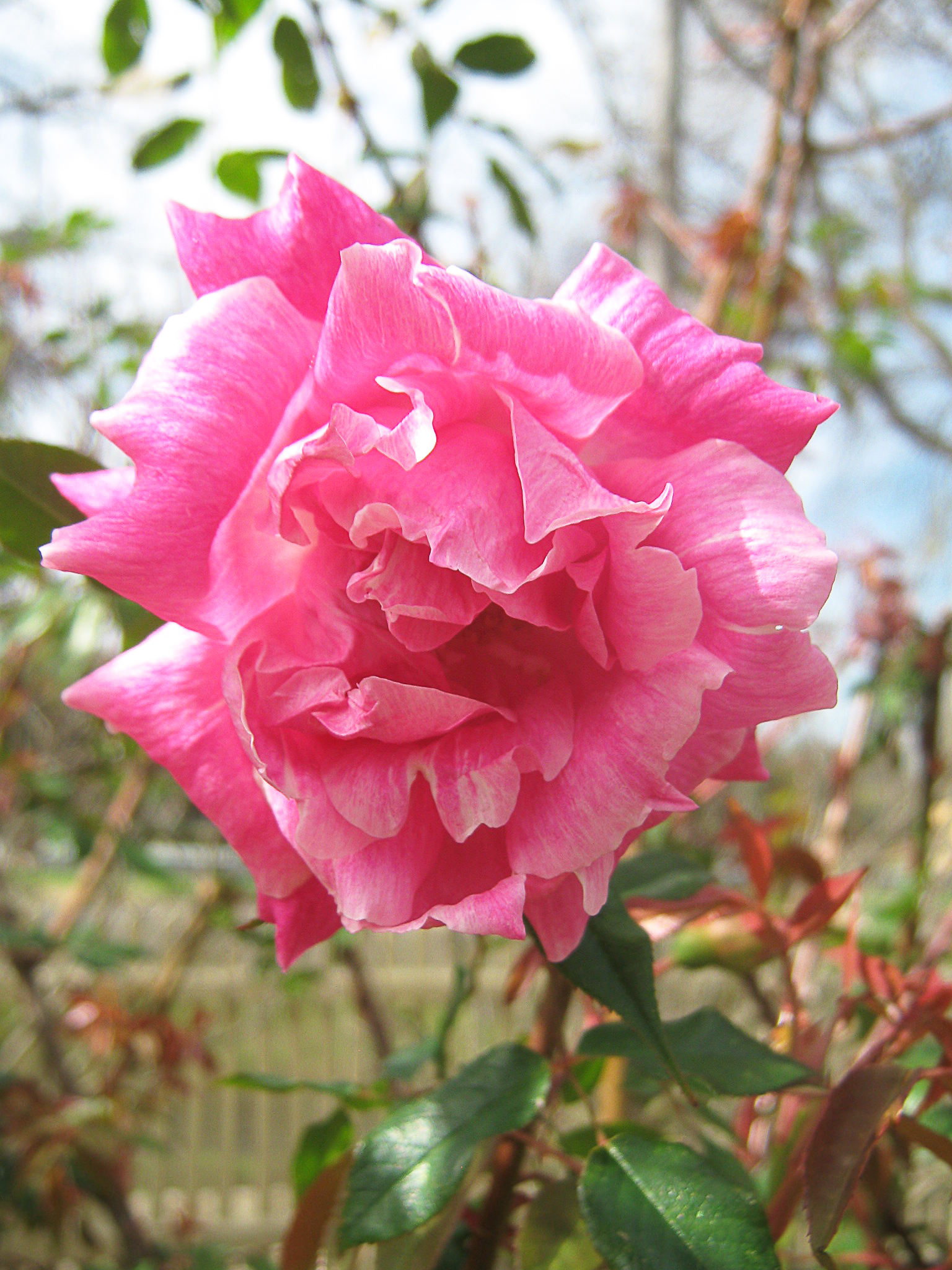
'Pennant' 1941, Hybrid Gigantea. A very double pink rose growing to six metres. The leaves are often more conspicuous than the flowers.

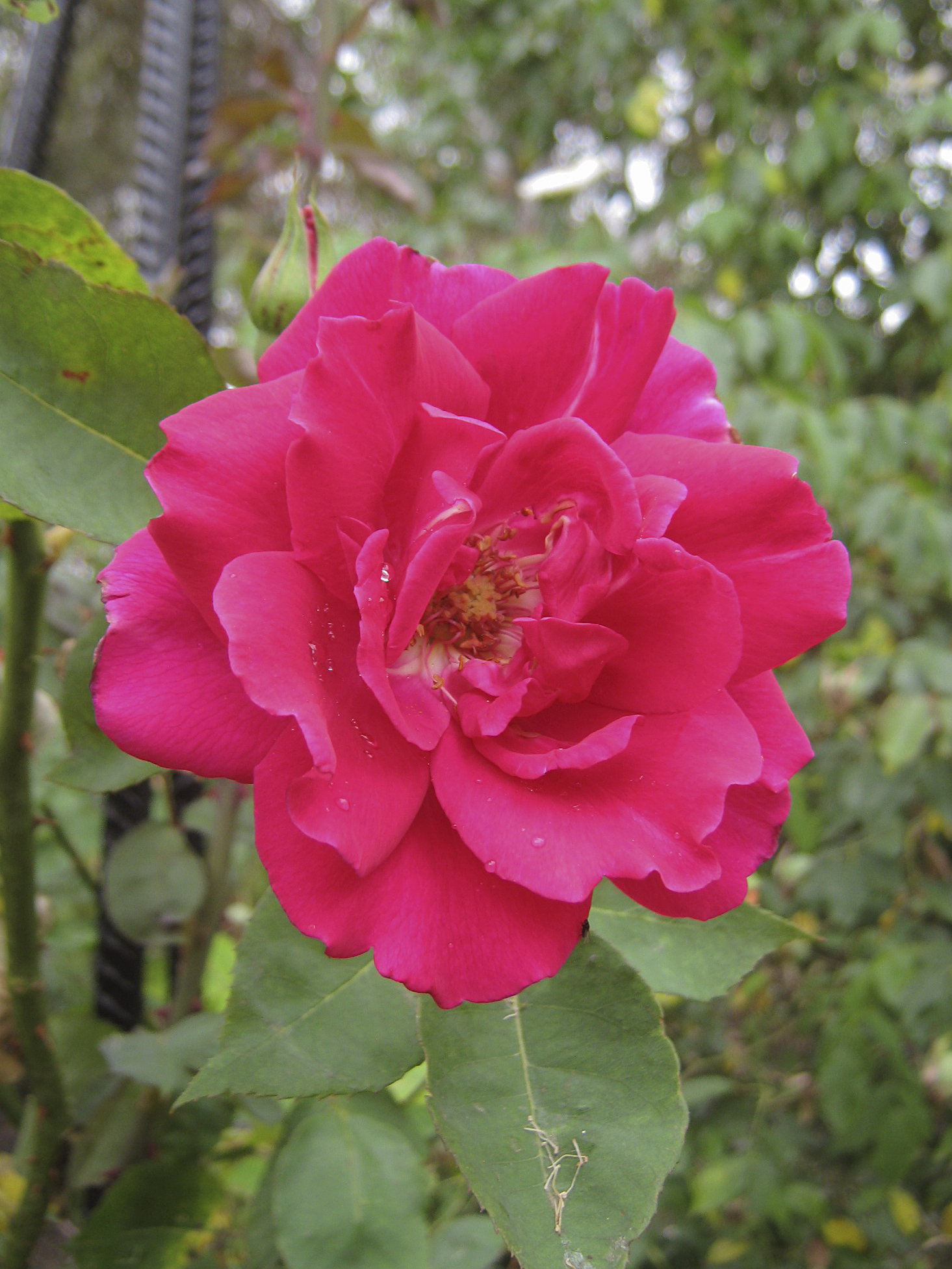
'Princeps' 1942, Hybrid Tea climber. From the 1920s until the end of his life Clark shared the period craze for dark red roses. Perhaps his Latin princeps means "first among equals".

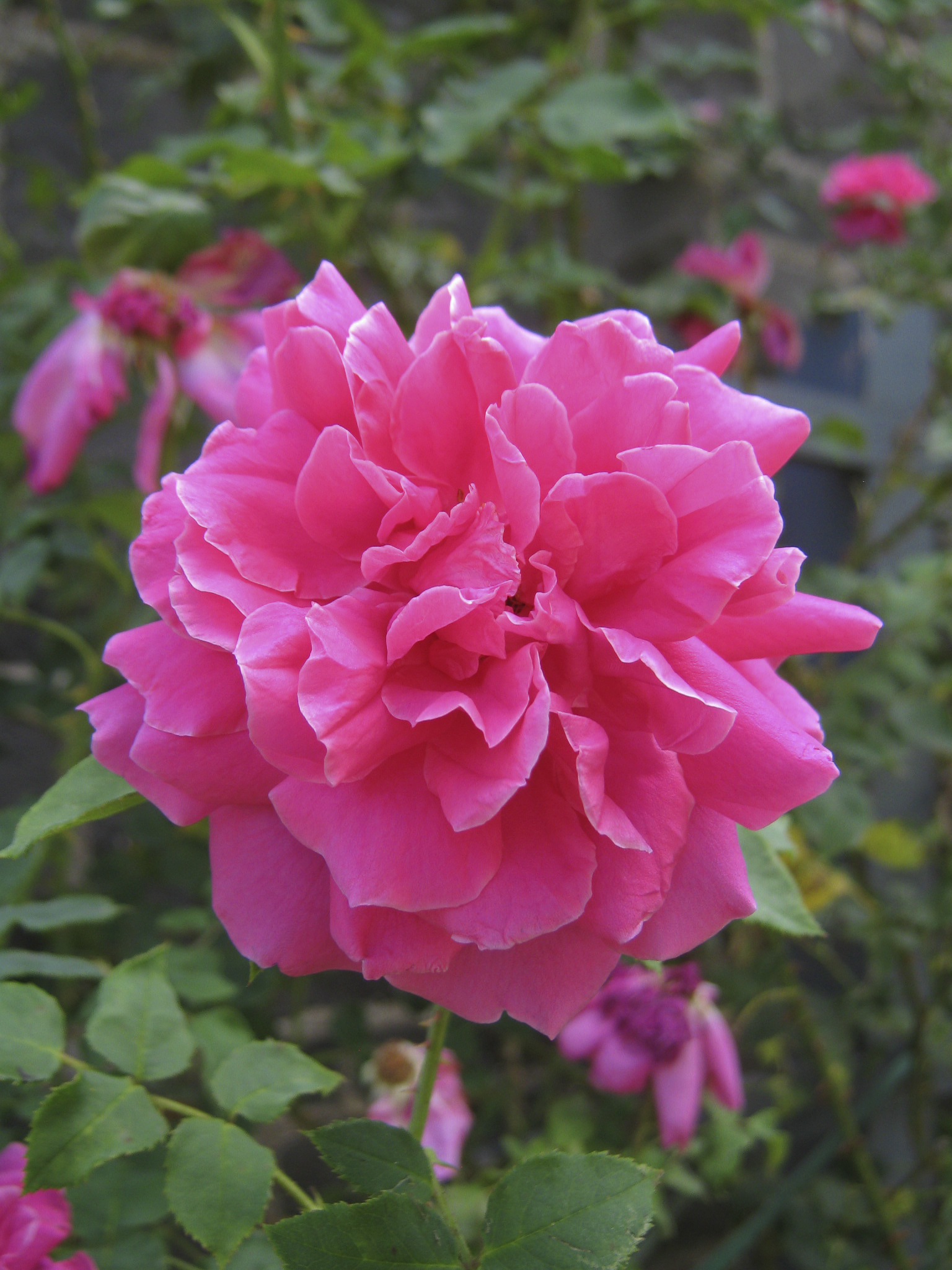
'Queen of Hearts' 1919, Hybrid Tea climber. Highly scented, growing to over three metres. Queen of Hearts was probably a racehorse.

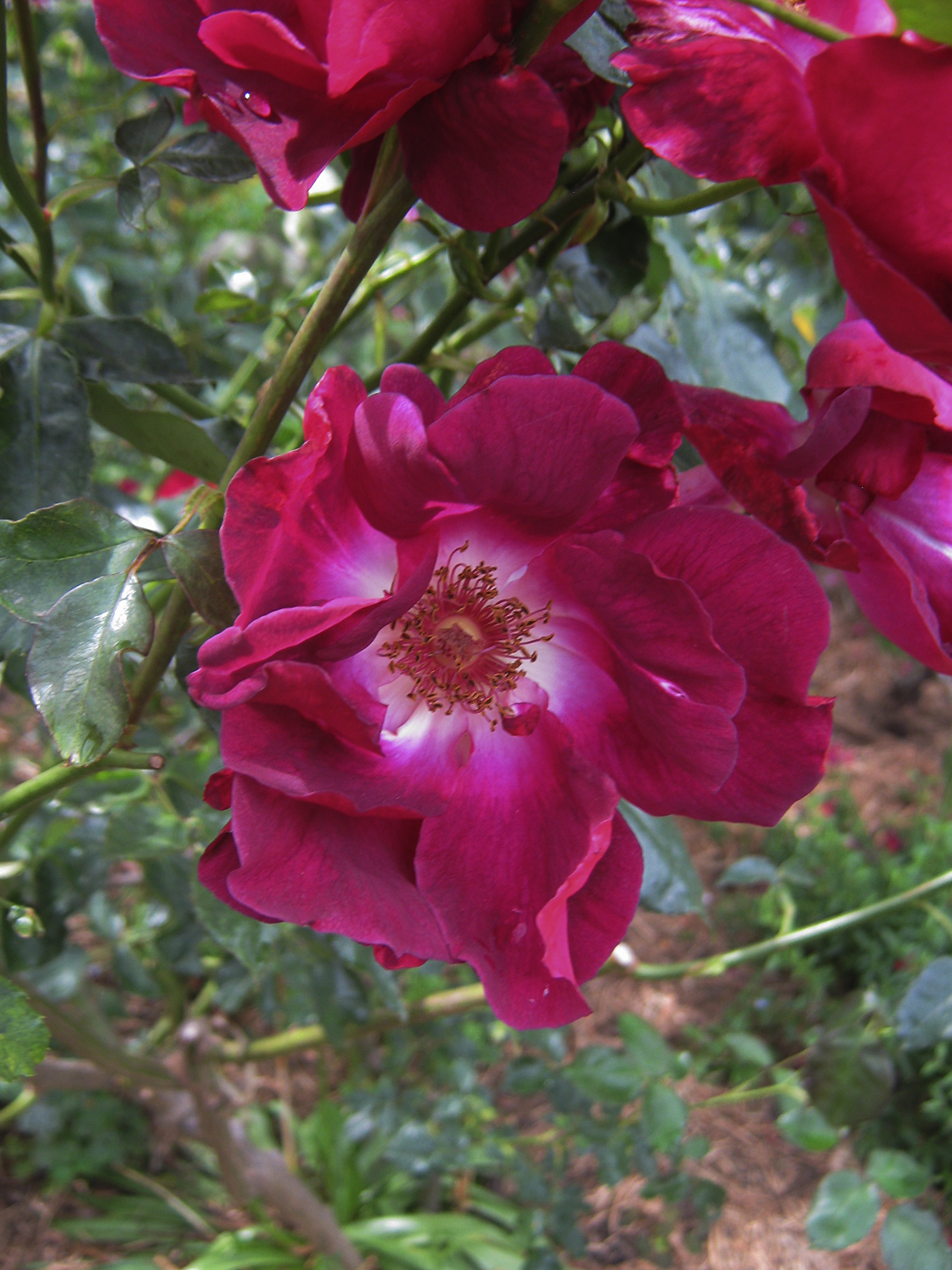
'Restless' 1938, Hybrid Tea. Said to have the name because the bush moves around freely in the wind.

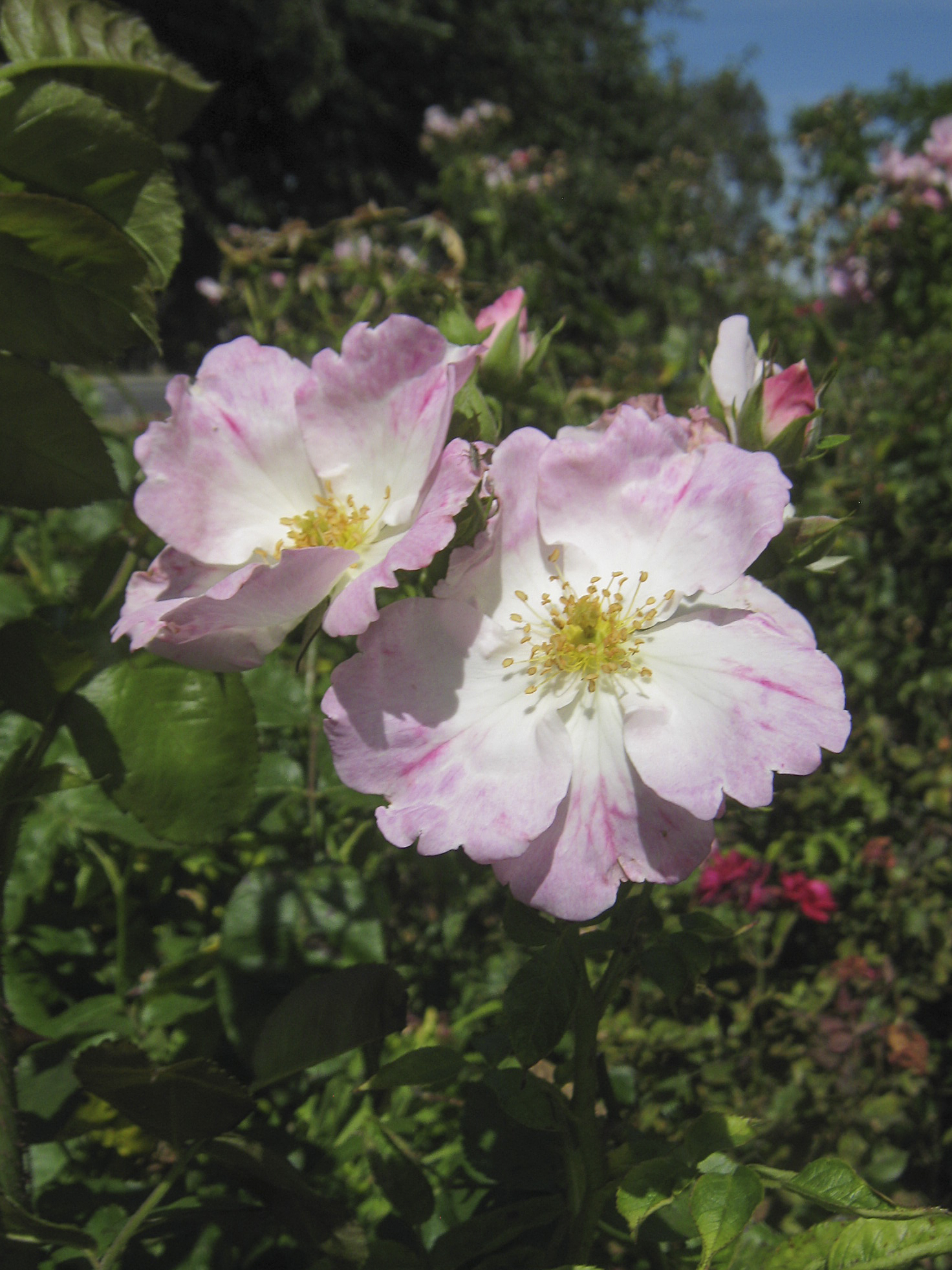
'Ringlet' 1922, Hybrid Tea climber. Masses of scented simple flowers recurrently.

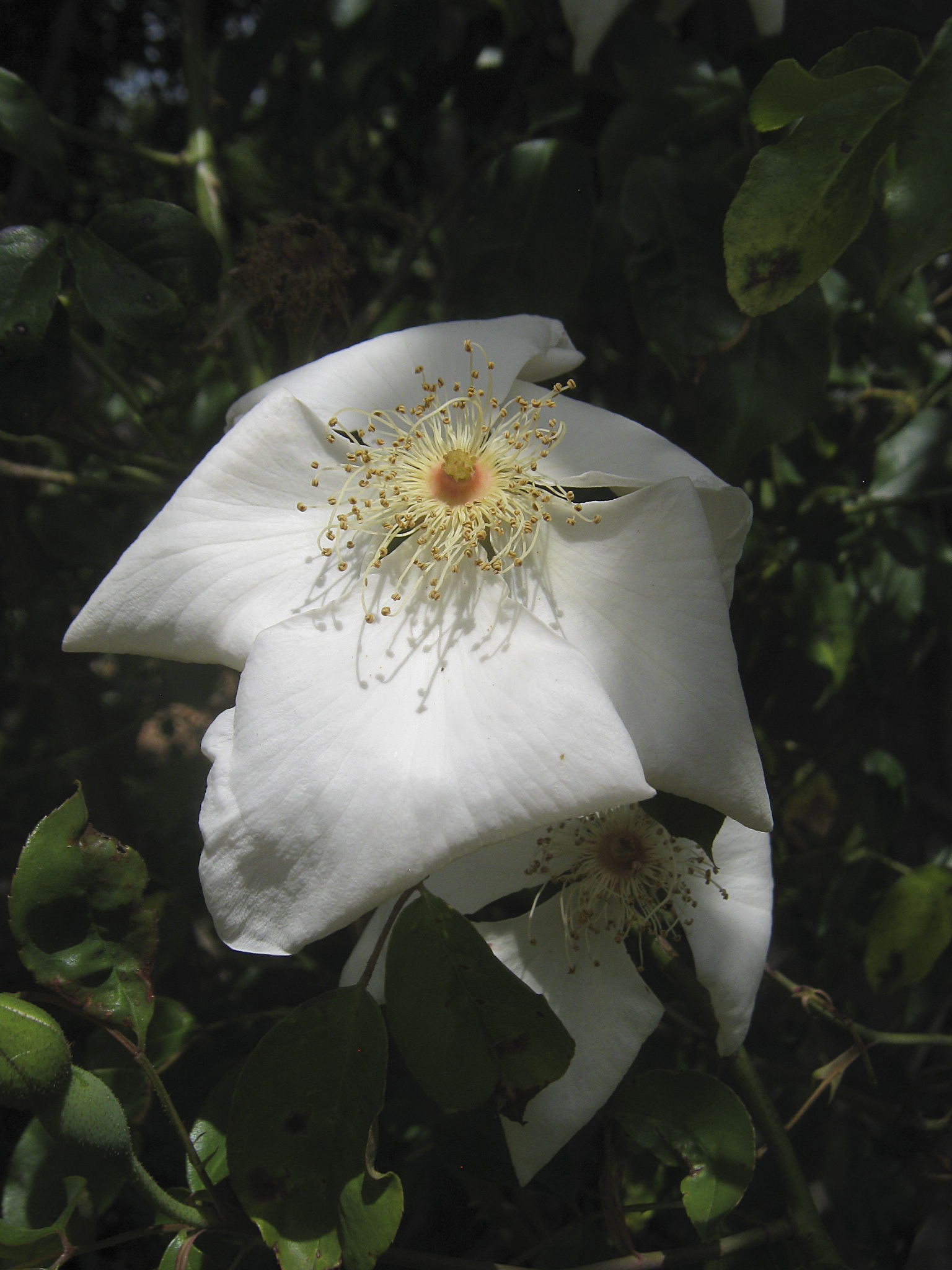
Rosa gigantea The tallest of all species roses, found in the Himalayas and southern China. Clark made many direct and second-generation crosses to it, more successfully than any other rose breeder.

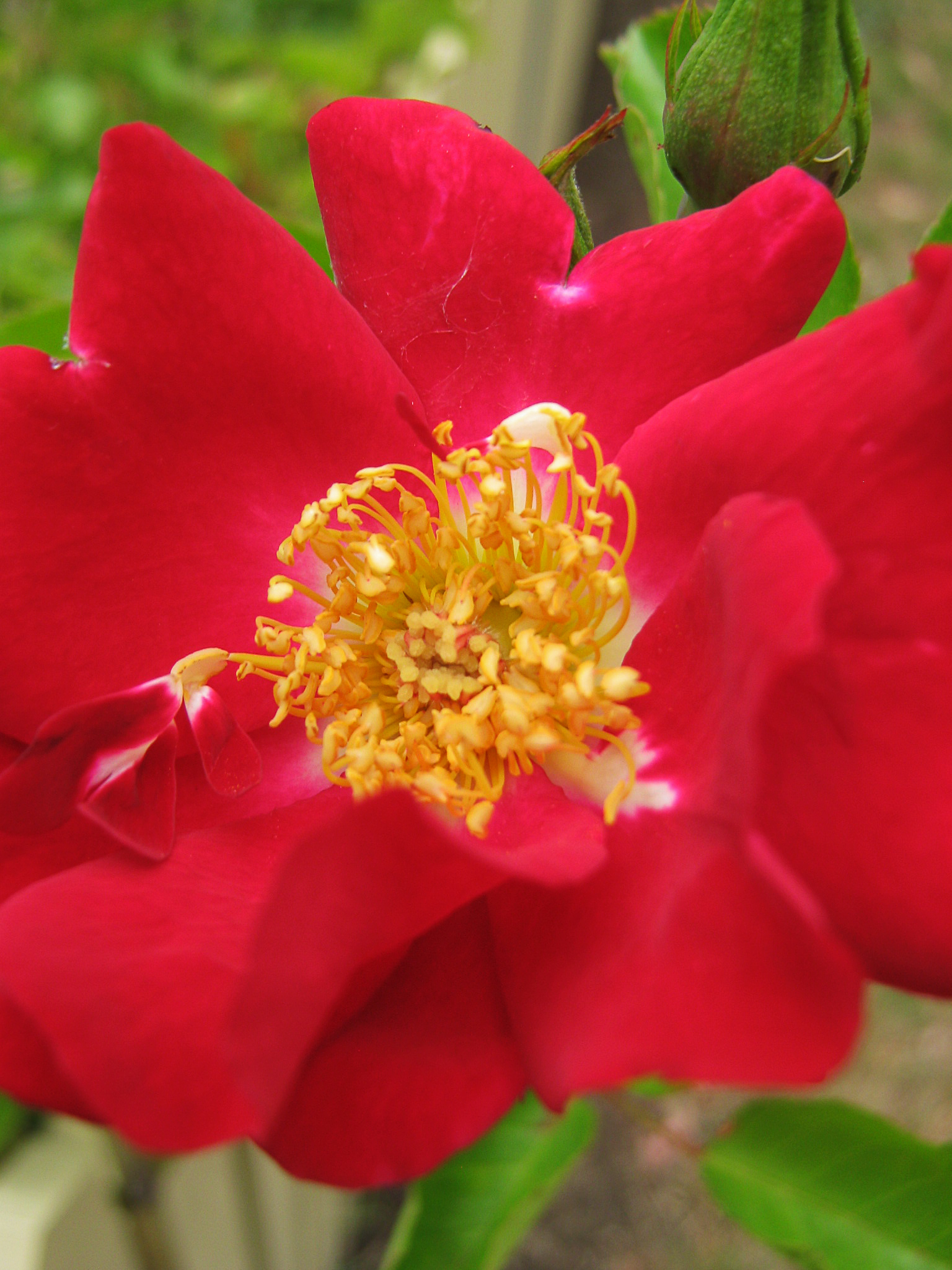
'Scorcher' 1922, dark red Hybrid Gigantea. A scorcher was slang for a very hot day.

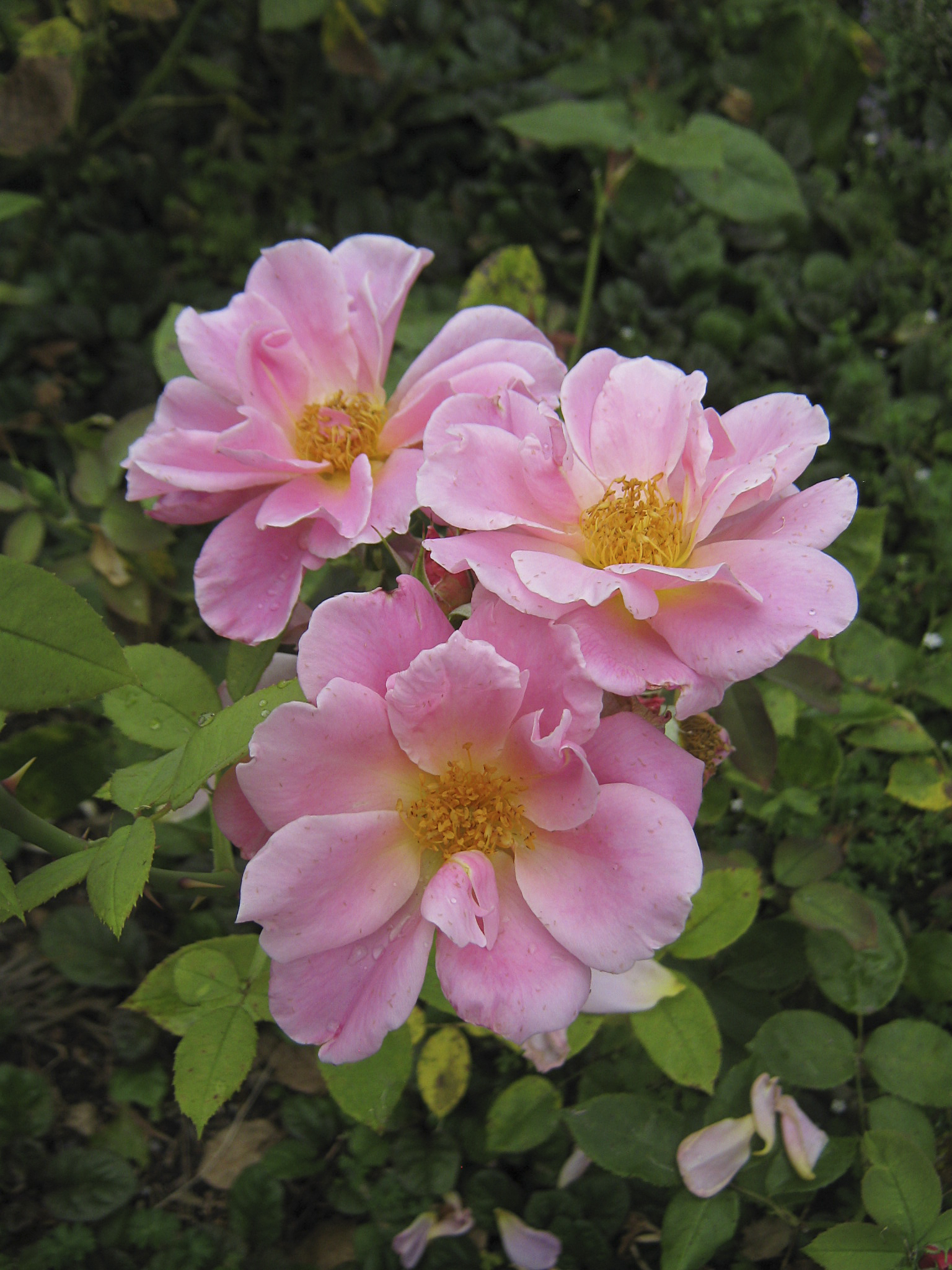
'Sheila Bellair' 1937, Hybrid Tea. Sheila Bellair (1912–1975) and her sisters were members of Oaklands Hunt Club, as was Alister Clark. Their father was a racing colleague of his.

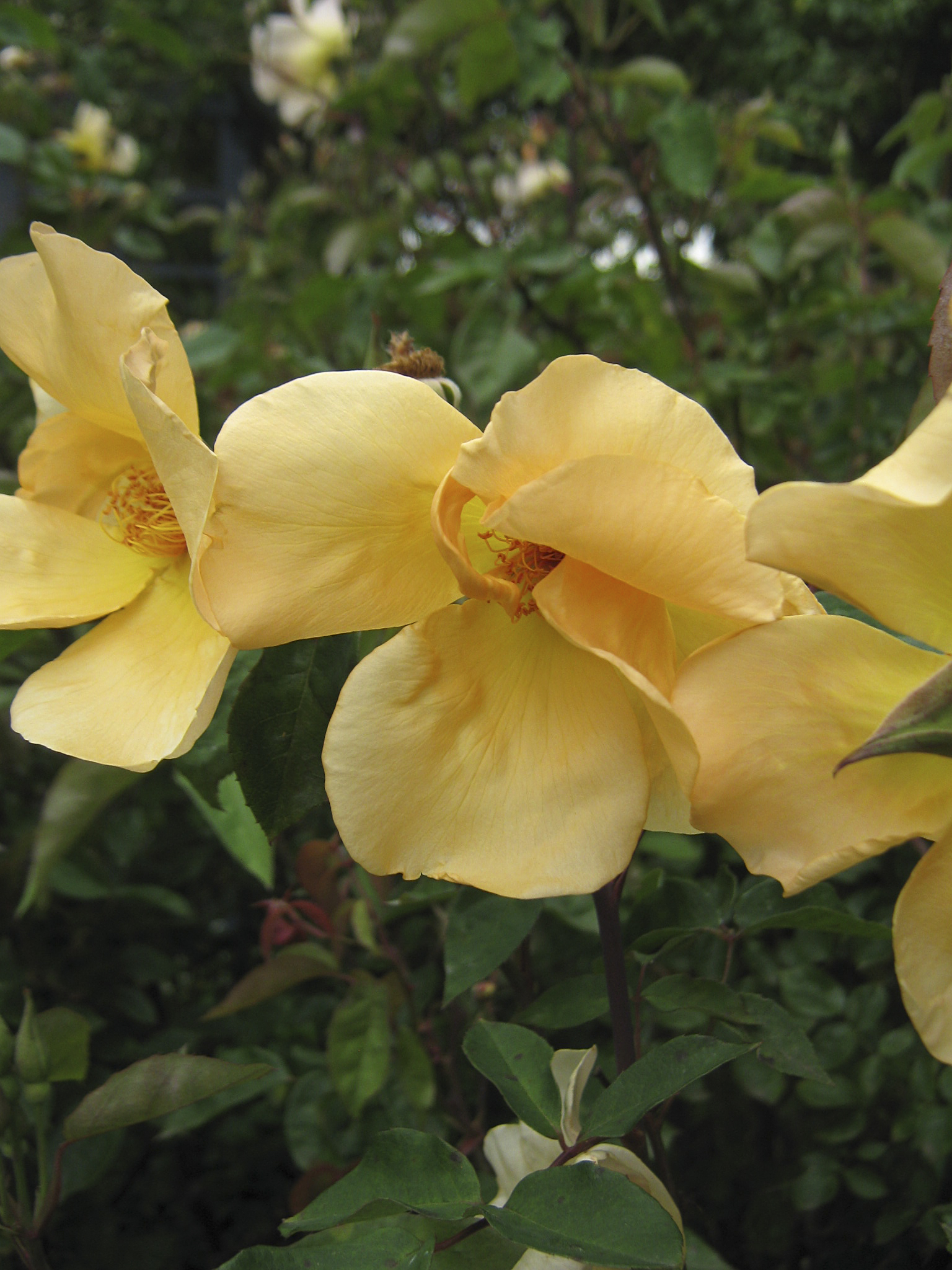
'Squatter's Dream' 1923, Hybrid Gigantea. Squatter's Dream was a racehorse. This single rose, 2 metres tall, is thought not to be Clark's short, double original.

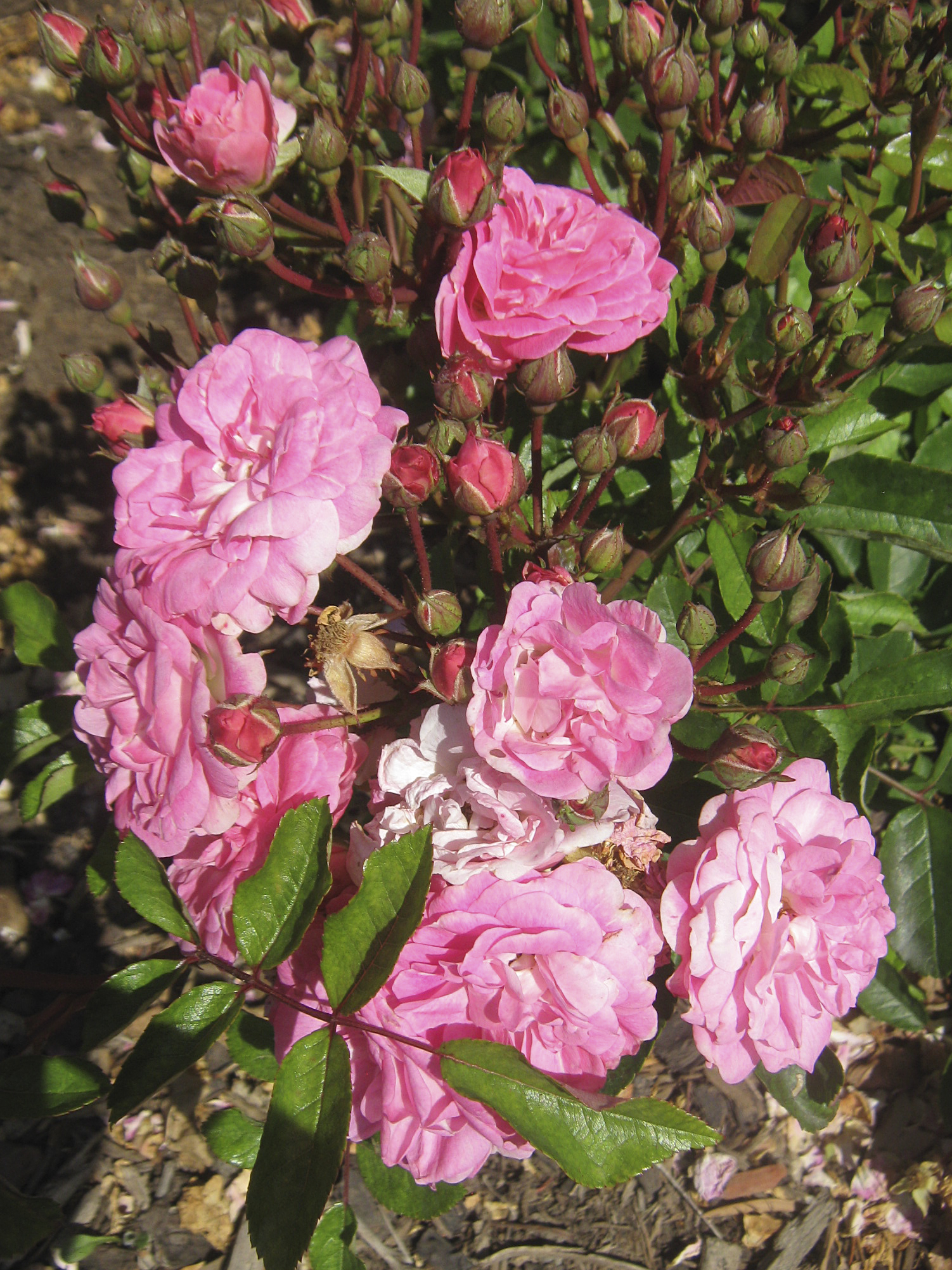
'Suitor' 1940, dwarf Polyantha. Suitor was a racehorse.

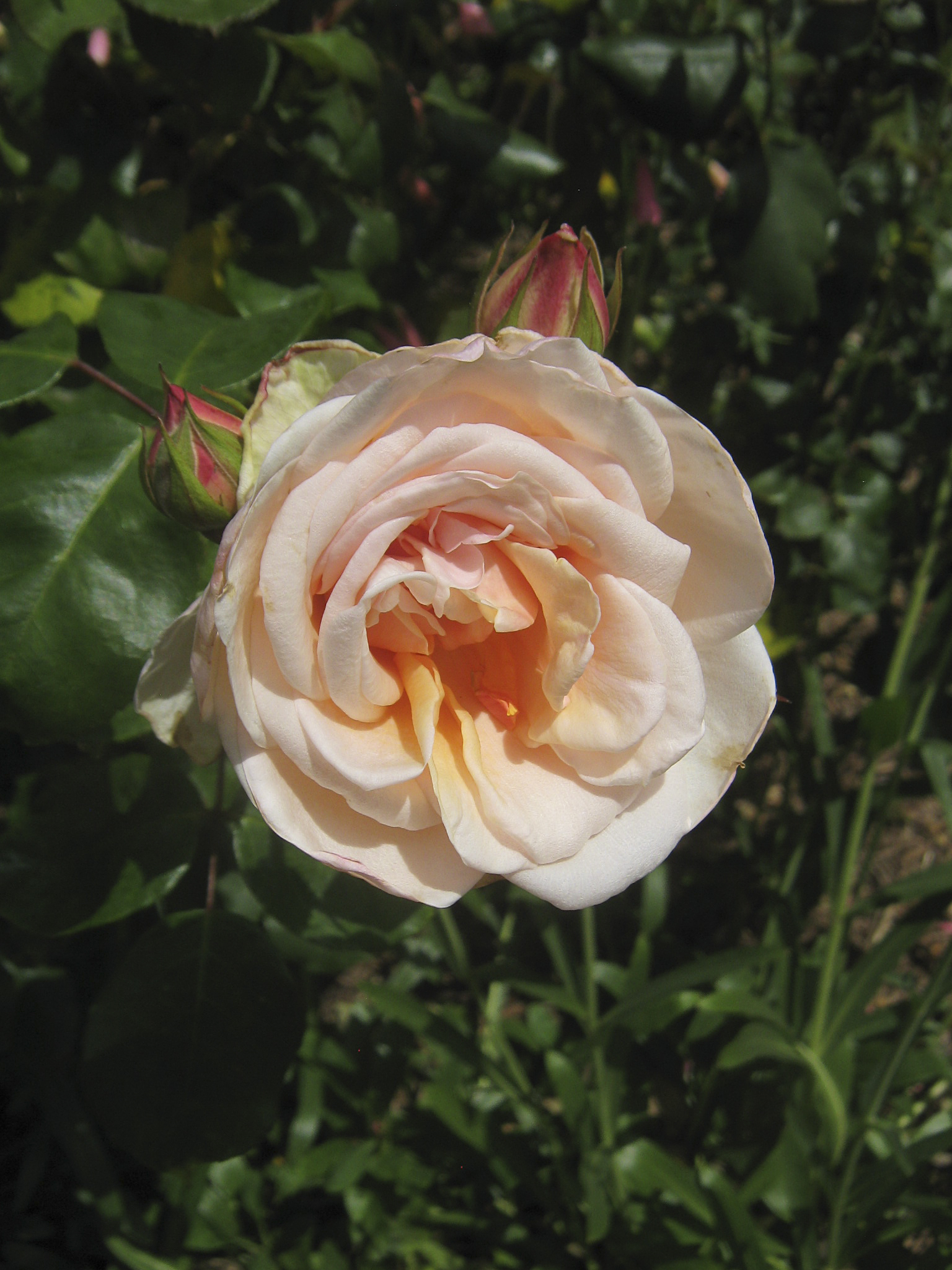
'Sunlit' 1937, Hybrid Tea. Good scent and always in flower.

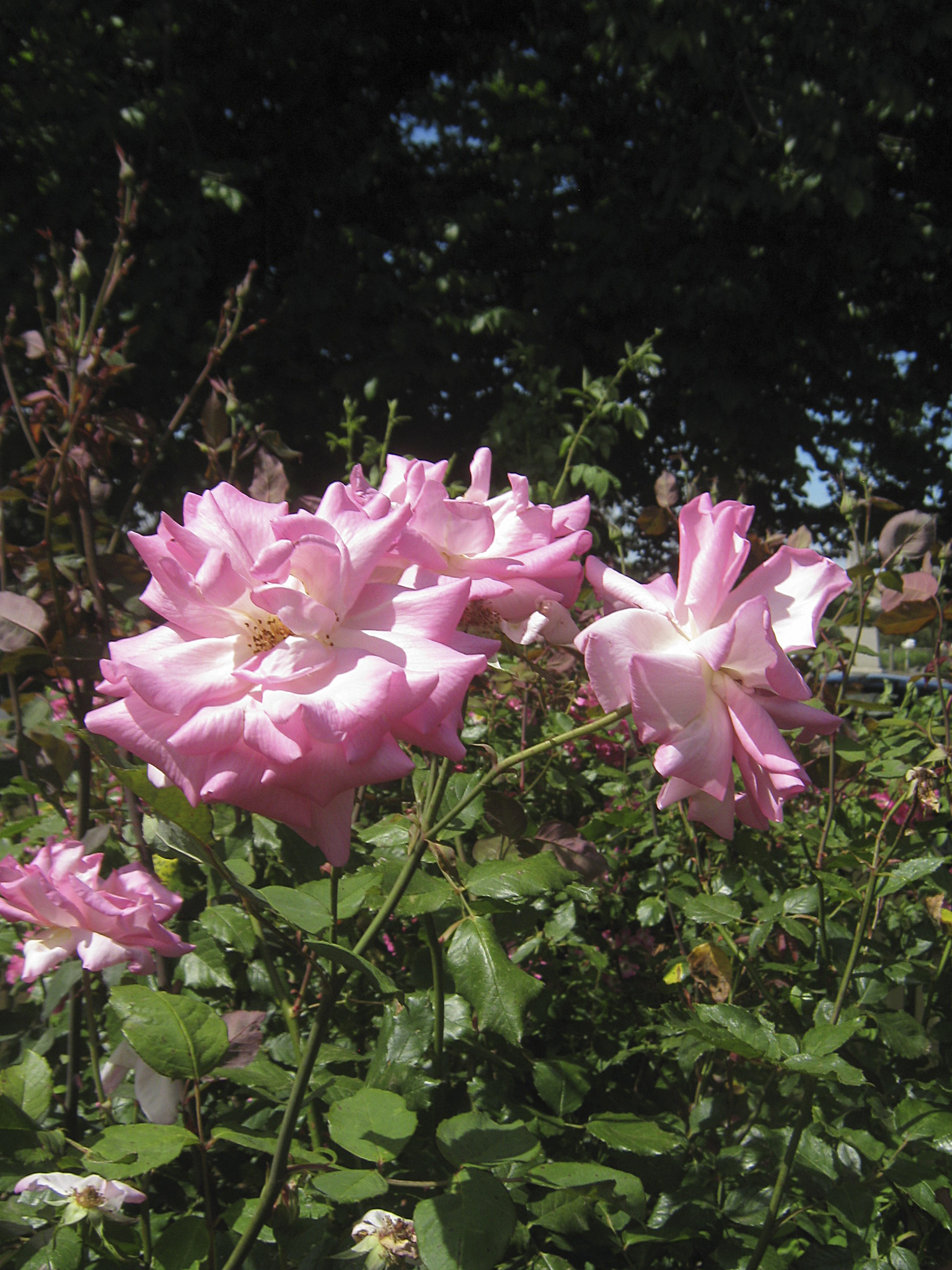
'Sunny South' 1918, Hybrid Tea. Widely used between the Wars as a tall hedging rose. Sunny South was the name of the Ivanhoe garden of the rosarian B.V. Rossi.

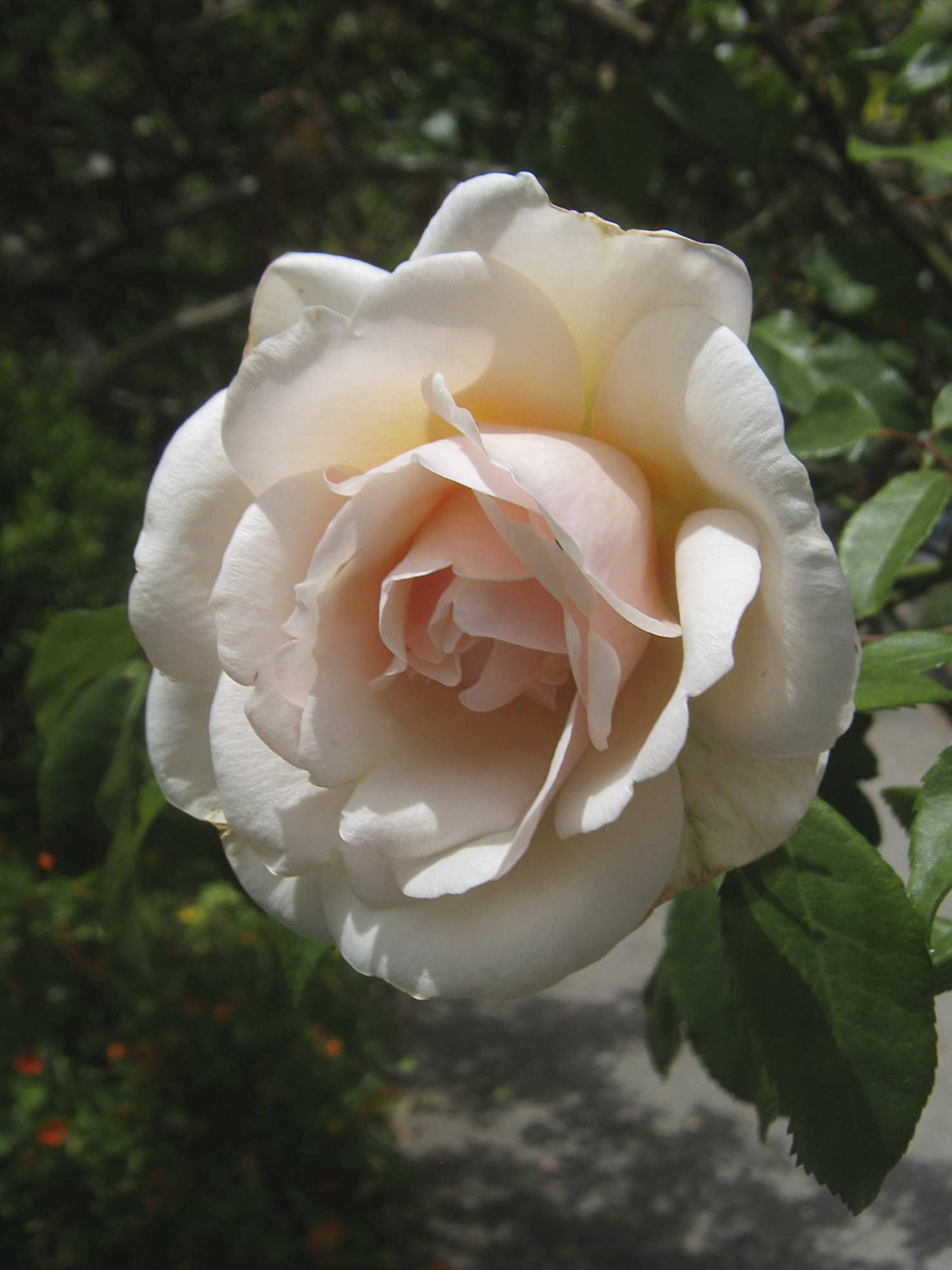
'Tonner's Fancy' 1928, double-flowered Hybrid Gigantea. Tonner's Fancy was a racehorse.

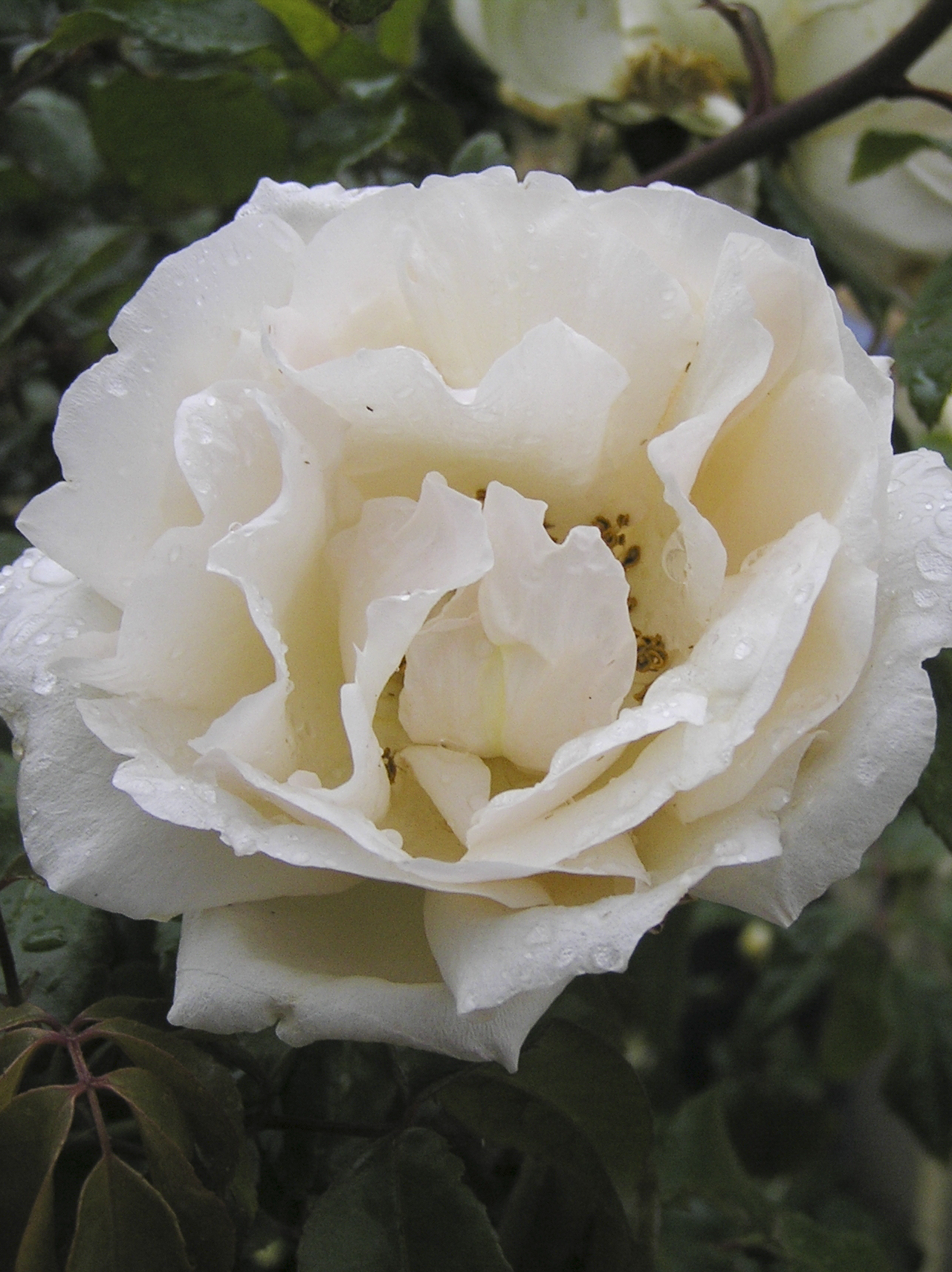
'Traverser' 1928, Hybrid Gigantea. One of "these double-flowering hybrids … Mr Clark has named Traverser, because of its ability to run and climb … The plant at Glenara … travelled 40ft. along [a] fence …"

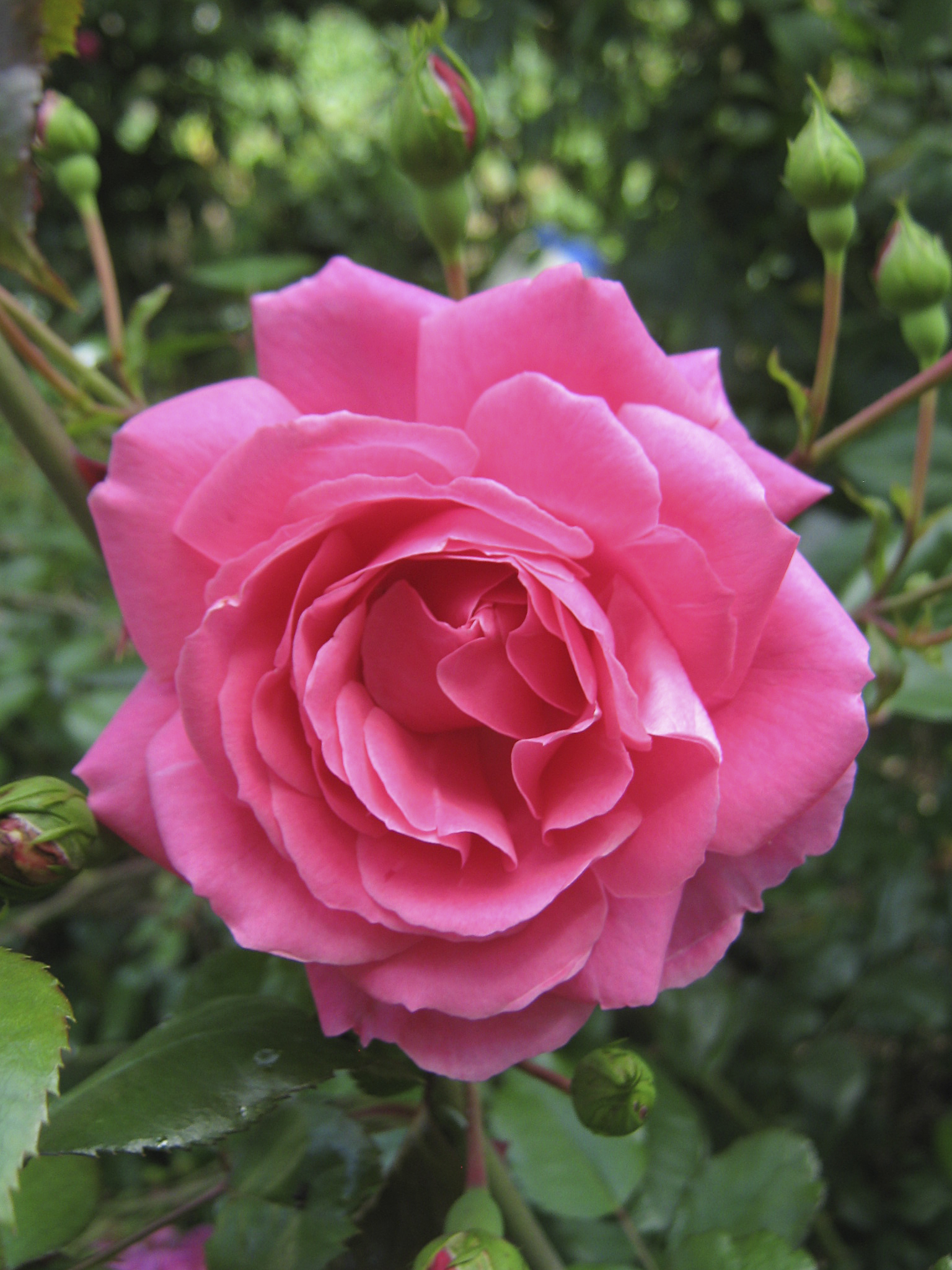
'Zara Hore-Ruthven' 1932, Hybrid Tea. Lady Gowrie (1879–1965) was the wife of a State Governor who later became Governor-General and Earl of Gowrie. Clark used Lady Gowrie's untitled married name. The Clarks knew the Gowries socially.

== See also ==
- Alister Clark
- List of Alister Clark roses
- "Alister Clark Memorial Rose Garden". Helpmefind Roses.
