= Animation in the United States during the silent era =

The silent age of American animation dates back to 1900 when Vitagraph released The Enchanted Drawing. Although early animations were rudimentary, they rapidly became more sophisticated with such classics as Gertie the Dinosaur in 1914, Felix the Cat, Oswald the Lucky Rabbit, and Koko the Clown.

Originally a novelty, some early animated silents depicted magic acts or were strongly influenced by the comic strip. Later, they were distributed along with newsreels. Early animation films, like their live-action silent cousins, would come with a musical score to be played by an organist or even an orchestra in larger theatres. Silent cartoons became almost entirely obsolete after 1928, when sound synchronized cartoons were introduced with the debut of Walt Disney's Mickey Mouse in Steamboat Willie, thus ushering in the golden age of American animation.

== History ==
The 1906 cartoon Humorous Phases of Funny Faces by J. Stuart Blackton

British-American filmmaker J. Stuart Blackton was possibly the first to use animation techniques in the US for film versions of his "lightning artist" routine. The Enchanted Drawing (1900) utilized the stop trick to make drawings appear to change magically. In Humorous Phases of Funny Faces (1906) he had blackboard drawings go through series of changes and used animated cutout drawings in the same style for more fluent motion. It is regarded as the oldest known theatrically released animation on standard film (lithographed film loops for home use and Charles-Émile Reynaud's Théâtre Optique films had already been popular in Europe for years).

Gertie the Dinosaur by Winsor McCay, 1914

Following the successes of Blackton and of French animator Émile Cohl (whose Fantasmagorie (1908) is regarded as the first traditional animation on standard film), many other artists began experimenting with animation. One such artist was Winsor McCay, who created detailed animation with painstaking attention to detail. Each frame was drawn on paper; which invariably required backgrounds and characters to be redrawn and animated. Among McCay's most noted films are Little Nemo (1911), Gertie the Dinosaur (1914) and The Sinking of the Lusitania (1918).

During the 1910s larger scale animation studios were becoming the industrial norm and artists such as McCay faded from the public eye. The production of animated short films, typically referred to as "cartoons", became an industry of its own during the 1910s, and cartoon shorts were produced to be shown in movie theaters.

Around 1913 Raoul Barré developed the peg system that made it easier to align drawings by perforating two holes below each drawing and placing them on two fixed pins. He also used a "slash and tear" technique to not have to draw the complete background or other motionless parts for every frame. The parts where something needed to be changed for the next frame were carefully cut away from the drawing and filled in with the required change on the sheet below. After Barré had started his career in animation at Edison Studios, he founded one of the first film studios dedicated to animation in 1914 (initially together with Bill Nolan). Barré Studio had success with the production of the adaptation of the comic strip Mutt and Jeff (1916–1926). The studio employed several animators who would have notable careers in animation, including Frank Moser, Gregory La Cava, Vernon Stallings, and Pat Sullivan.

In 1914, John Bray opened John Bray Studios, which revolutionized the way animation was created. Earl Hurd, one of Bray's employees patented the cel technique. This involved animating moving objects on transparent celluloid sheets. Animators photographed the sheets over a stationary background image to generate the sequence of images. This, as well as Bray's innovative use of the assembly line method, allowed John Bray Studios to create Colonel Heeza Liar, the first animated series. Many aspiring cartoonists started their careers at Bray, including Walt Disney (later of Mickey Mouse fame), Paul Terry (later of Heckle and Jeckle fame), Max Fleischer (later of Betty Boop and Popeye fame), and Walter Lantz (later of Woody Woodpecker fame). The cartoon studio operated from circa 1914 until 1928. Some of the first cartoon stars from the Bray studios were Farmer Alfalfa (by Paul Terry) and Bobby Bumps (by Earl Hurd).

In 1915, Max Fleischer applied for a patent for a technique that would become known as rotoscoping: the process of using live-action film recordings as a reference point to more easily create realistic animated movements. The technique was often used in the Out of the Inkwell series (1918-1929) for John Bray Productions (and others). The series resulted from experimental rotoscoped images of Dave Fleischer performing as a clown, evolving into a character that would become known as Ko-Ko the Clown.

Newspaper tycoon William Randolph Hearst founded International Film Service in 1916. Hearst lured away most of Barré Studio's animators, with Gregory La Cava becoming the head of the studio. They produced adaptations of many comic strips from Heart's newspapers in a rather limited fashion, giving just a little motion to the characters while mainly using the dialog balloons to deliver the story. The most notable series was Krazy Kat, with an early anthropomorphic cartoon cat character. Before the studio stopped in 1918 it had employed some new talents, including Vernon Stallings, Ben Sharpsteen, Jack King, John Foster, Grim Natwick, Burt Gillett and Isadore Klein.

The 1919 Feline Follies by Pat Sullivan

The most popular cartoon series during the silent era was Australian-American film producer Pat Sullivan's Felix the Cat. Felix the Cat (Originally named Master Tom) first appeared in Feline Follies (1919) and became hugely successful throughout the 1920s. The studio later came into trouble during the advent of sound cartoons in the early 1930s when the popularity of Walt Disney's Mickey Mouse was rising above Sullivan's Felix. Sullivan tried to adapt Felix by creating Felix sound cartoons, but they failed to please audiences and Sullivan closed the studio in 1930. He died three years later due to health problems related to alcoholism.

Charles Bowers was a comedian and animator who made many bizarre films in the 1920s combining stop-motion animation and comedy. Many of them have been lost, but some have been released on DVD.

== List of US animated silent films ==
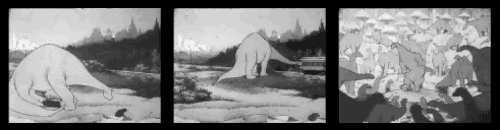
Gertie on Tour

Very incomplete list (most of the early films in general are lost, many were not documented, forgotten, and/or insignificant). Listed filmmakers can be creators, directors, producers, animators or complete studios. If a series was taken over by other filmmakers, not all filmmakers will be listed.

| Date | Filmmaker | Title | Note |
|---|---|---|---|
| 1900 | J. Stuart Blackton | The Enchanted Drawing | |
| 1906 | J. Stuart Blackton | Humorous Phases of Funny Faces | |
| 1911 | Winsor McCay | Little Nemo | character Flip returned in Flip's Circus (circa 1918–1921, survives only in fragments) |
| 1912 | Winsor McCay | How a Mosquito Operates | |
| 1913–1915 | Sidney Smith | Old Doc Yak (20 episodes) | first series with a recurring character |
| 1913–1917, 1922-1924 | John Randolph Bray | Colonel Heeza Liar (58 episodes) | second series featured live-action/animation |
| 1914 | Winsor McCay | Gertie the Dinosaur | follow-up Gertie on Tour (circa 1918–1921) survives only in fragments |
| 1915 | Willis O'Brien | The Dinosaur and the Missing Link: A Prehistoric Tragedy | stop motion |
| 1915-1955 | Paul Terry | Farmer Al Falfa (series) | produced for several studios, with sound since 1928 |
| 1915-1916 | International Film Service | Phables (series) | |
| 1915-1925 | Bray Productions | Bobby Bumps (series) | first cel-animated series |
| 1916–1923, 1925-1926 | Barré Studio | Mutt and Jeff (series) | licensed from the comic strip by Bud Fisher |
| 1916–1917, 1920–1921, 1925-1940 | International Film Service, Bray Productions, Winkler Pictures, Screen Gems | Krazy Kat (series) | with sound since 1929 |
| 1916–1918, 1920 | International Film Service | The Katzenjammer Kids / The Shenninigan Kids (37+5 episodes) | |
| 1918 | Winsor McCay | The Sinking of the Lusitania | regarded as the first animated documentary |
| 1918-1929 | Dave Fleischer / Max Fleischer | Out of the Inkwell | live-action/animation featuring Koko the Clown |
| 1919-1930 | Pat Sullivan | Felix the Cat (series) | with sound since 1928, revived in 1936, 1959, 1975, 1988, 1995, 2001, 2004 |
| 1921 (September) | Winsor McCay | Bug Vaudeville, The Pet, The Flying House | three separate shorts, forming a Dream of the Rarebit Fiend anthology |
| 1921 | Winsor McCay | The Centaurs | survives only in fragments |
| 1921 | John Coleman Terry | Joys and Glooms | |
| 1921-1923 | Laugh-O-Gram Studio (Walt Disney & Ub Iwerks) | Laugh-O-Grams (series) | |
| 1921-1929 | Paul Terry | Aesop's Fables (series) | |
| 1923-1927 | Walt Disney & Ub Iwerks | Alice Comedies (series) | |
| 1924–1927 | Walter Lantz | Dinky Doodle (series) | |
| 1925 | Willis O'Brien | The Lost World | feature with stop motion creatures |
| 1927-1928 | Walt Disney & Ub Iwerks | Oswald the Lucky Rabbit (series) | taken over by other studios until 1938, with sound since 1929, additional short in 1943, cameos in other films |

Significant distributors of animated films: Margaret J. Winkler, Charles Mintz, Educational Pictures, Red Seal Pictures, Bijou Films

== Legacy ==
Three films by Winsor McCay (Little Nemo, Gertie the Dinosaur, The Sinking of the Lusitania) were each inducted into the National Film Registry

== See also ==
- Belle Époque
- Roaring Twenties
- Classical Hollywood cinema
- Golden age of American animation
- History of animation
- List of animated feature films
