= List of short film series =

This article is the list of short film series since the inception of filmmaking in the 19th century.

== 19th century ==
=== 1890s ===
Name	Studio	Instalments	First	Last	Medium	Note(s)	Ref(s)
1896 Melbourne Cup Carnival	Lumière	15	Arrivée d’un train à Melbourne	Présentation du vainqueur	Documentary		
English cricket team in Australia in 1897–98	Falk Studios	4	Prince Ranjitsinhji Practising Batting in the Nets	New South Wales Cricket team leaving the field	Documentary		

== 20th century ==
=== 1910s ===
Name	Studio	Instalments	First	Last	Medium	Note(s)	Ref(s)
Sherlock Holmes	Éclair	8	The Speckled Band (1912)	The Copper Beeches (1913)	Live action		
Colonel Heeza Liar	Bray Studios	58	Colonel Heeza Liar In Africa (November 23, 1913)	Colonel Heeza Liar, Nature Faker (December 1, 1924)	Animation		
The Police Dog	Bray Studios	12	The Police Dog (November 21, 1914)	The Pinkerton Pup's Portrait (February 25, 1918)	Animation		
Bobby Bumps	Bray Studios	75	Bobby Bumps Gets Pa's Goat (1915)	Bobby Bumps and Company (1925)	Animation	Fresh Fish (1922) includes live-action	

=== 1920s ===
Name	Studio	Instalments	First	Last	Medium	Note(s)	Ref(s)
Aesop's Fables	Fable Studios, Inc.	N/A	The Goose That Laid the Golden Eggs (May 13, 1921)	N/A	Animation		
Brownie the Wonder Dog	Century Film Company	N/A	Brownie's Little Venus (1921)	Little Johnny Jones (1923)	Live-action		
Bray Magazine	Bray Studios	4	Strap Hangers	If We Reversed (1923)	Animation		
Alice Comedies	Disney Company	57	Alice's Wonderland (1923)	Alice in the Big League (1927)	Live action and animation		
Let George Do It	Universal Pictures	40	George The Winner (1926)	The Cut-Ups (1929)	Live action		

=== 1930s ===
Name	Studio	Instalments	First	Last	Medium	Note(s)	Ref(s)
Spooney Melodies	Warner Bros.	5	Cryin' for the Carolines (December 1930)	For You (December 1931)	Live action		
Puppetoons	George Pal	40	Midnight (1932)	Sweet Pacific (1948)	Stop-motion and puppeteering		

=== 1940s ===
Name	Studio	Instalments	First	Last	Medium	Note(s)	Ref(s)
Gabby	Fleischer Studios	8	King for a Day (October 18, 1940)	It's a Hap-Hap-Happy Day (August 15, 1941)	Animation		
Stone Age Cartoons	Fleischer Studios	12	Way Back When a Triangle Had Its Points (26 January 1940)	Way Back When Women Had Their Weigh (26 September 1940)	Animation		
Superman	Paramount Pictures	17	Superman (September 26, 1941)	Terror on the Midway (August 28, 1942)	Animation		

=== 1950s ===
Name	Studio	Instalments	First	Last	Medium	Note(s)	Ref(s)
Mr. Magoo	United Productions of America	56	Trouble Indemnity (September 14, 1950)	Terror Faces Magoo (July 9, 1959)	Animation		
Casper the Friendly Ghost	Famous Studios	52	Casper's Spree Under the Sea (October 27, 1950)	Casper's Birthday Party (July 31, 1959)	Animation		
Kartunes	Famous Studios	12	Vegetable Vaudeville (November 9, 1951)	No Place Like Rome (July 31, 1953)	Animation		
Gerald McBoing Boing	United Productions of America	3	Gerald McBoing Boing's Symphony (July 15, 1953)	Gerald McBoing! Boing! on Planet Moo (July 9, 1959)	Animation		
Spike and Tyke	Metro-Goldwyn-Mayer	2	Give and Tyke (March 29, 1957)	Scat Cats (July 26, 1957)	Animation		
Modern Madcaps	Famous Studios	65	Right Off the Bat (November 17, 1958)	The Blacksheep Blacksmith (1967)	Animation		

=== 1960s ===
Name	Studio	Instalments	First	Last	Medium	Note(s)	Ref(s)
World Wide Adventures	Warner Bros.	38	A Touch of Gold (October 1962)	A Walk Through the Sounds of Switzerland (July 1, 1970)	Live-action		
Red Asphalt	California Highway Patrol	5	Red Asphalt (1964)	Red Asphalt V (2006)	Live-action	Documentaries	
The Inspector	DePatie–Freleng Enterprises	34	The Great De Gaulle Stone Operation (December 21, 1965)	Carte Blanched (May 14, 1969)	Animation		

=== 1970s ===
Name	Studio	Instalments	First	Last	Medium	Note(s)	Ref(s)
The Three Fools	Donyo Donev	11	The Three Fools (June 27, 1970)	The Three Fools Non-stop (June 10, 1990)	Animation		
The Blue Racer	DePatie–Freleng Enterprises	17	Hiss and Hers (July 3, 1972)	Little Boa Peep (January 16, 1974)	Animation		
The Dogfather	DePatie–Freleng Enterprises	17	The Dogfather (June 27, 1974)	Medicur (April 30, 1976)	Animation		

=== 1980s ===
Name	Studio	Instalments	First	Last	Medium	Note(s)	Ref(s)
Sweet Disaster	Channel 4	5	Babylon (1986)	Death of a Speechwriter (1986)	Animation		
Roger Rabbit	Disney	3	Tummy Trouble (June 23, 1989)	Trail Mix-Up (March 12, 1993)	Animation and live-action		

=== 1990s ===
Name	Studio	Instalments	First	Last	Medium	Note(s)	Ref(s)
The Spirit of Christmas	Avenging Conscience	2	Jesus vs. Frosty (December 8, 1992)	Jesus vs. Santa (December 1, 1995)	Animation		
The Fairly OddParents	Nickelodeon	10	The Fairly OddParents! (September 4, 1998)	Super Humor (March 23, 2001)	Animation		

== 21st century ==
=== 2000s ===
Name	Studio	Instalments	First	Last	Medium	Note(s)	Ref(s)
The Hire	BMW	13	Ambush (2001)	The Escape (2016)	Live-action		
893239		24	As for the Fingers (2006)	Yakuza's Delivery (2007)	Live-action		
Assassin's Creed: Lineage	Ubisoft	3	One (26 October 2009)	Three (2009)	Animation		

=== 2010s ===
Name	Studio	Instalments	First	Last	Medium	Note(s)	Ref(s)
DC Showcase	Warner Bros. Animation	9	The Spectre (February 23, 2010)	Adam Strange (May 19, 2020)	Animation		
Toy Story Toons	Pixar	3	Hawaiian Vacation (June 24, 2011)	Partysaurus Rex (September 14, 2012)	Animation		
Marvel One-Shots	Marvel Studios	5	The Consultant (September 13, 2011)	All Hail the King (February 4, 2014)	Live-action		
The Grasslands Project	National Film Board of Canada	10	A Rancher’s View (May 6, 2016)	Les Fransaskois (May 14, 2016)	Live-action	Documentaries	
Team Thor	Marvel Studios	3	Team Thor (July 23, 2016)	Team Darryl (February 20, 2018)	Live-action	Mocumentaries	

=== 2020s ===
Name	Studio	Instalments	First	Last	Medium	Note(s)	Ref(s)
Short Circuit	Disney	14	Puddles (January 24, 2020)	Reflect (September 14, 2022)	Animation		

== See also ==
- Lists of feature film series
- List of animated short film series
