= Gertie the Dinosaur =

1914 animated silent film

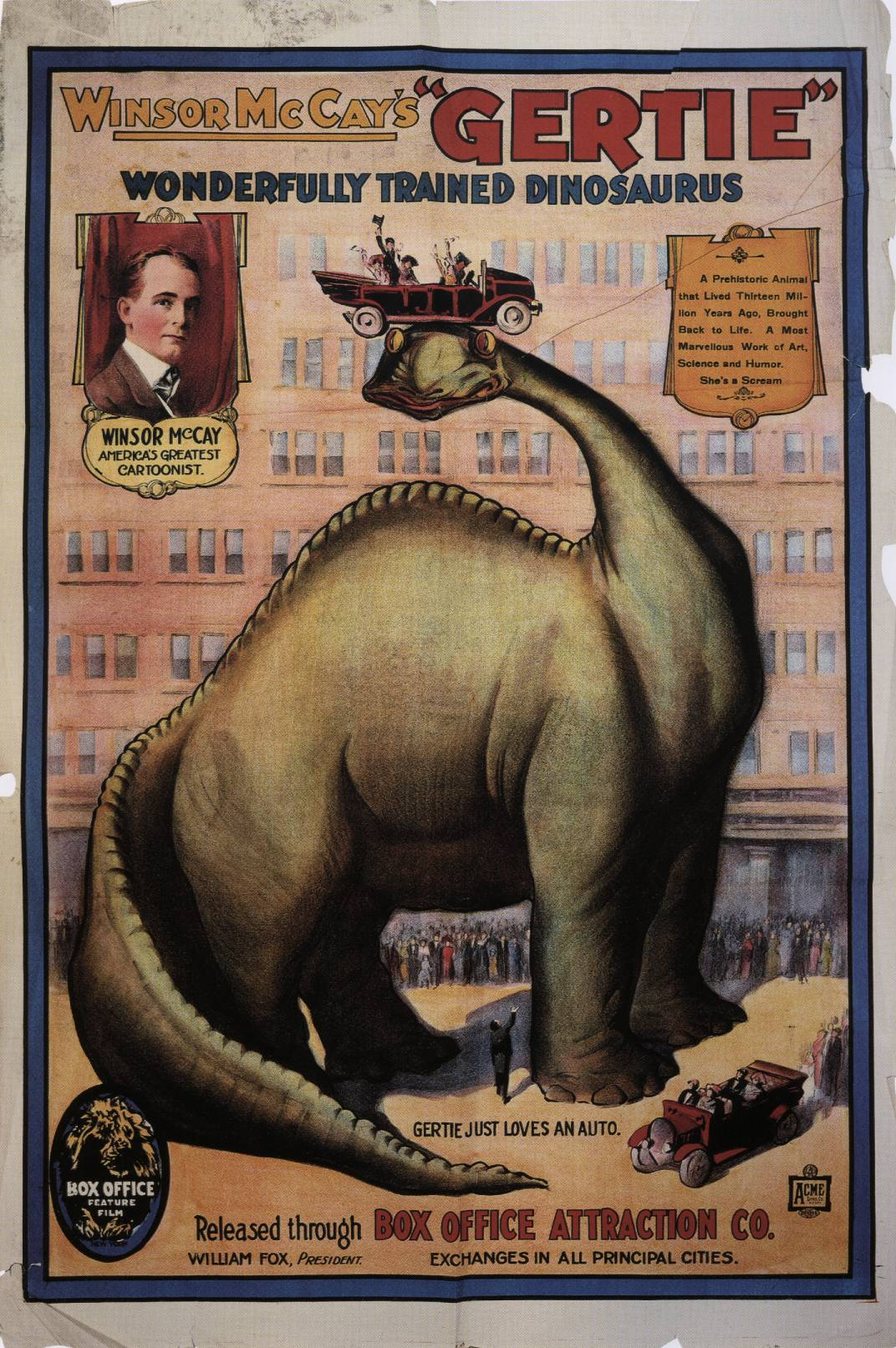
- Promotional poster
- Directed by: Winsor McCay
- Distributed by: Box Office Attractions Company
- Release date: February 8, 1914
- Running time: 12 minutes
- Country: United States
- Language: Silent film with English intertitles

Gertie the Dinosaur is an animated short film released in 1914 by American cartoonist and animator Winsor McCay. It is the first animated film to feature a dinosaur. McCay initially presented the film before live audiences as an interactive part of his vaudeville act; the frisky, childlike Gertie performed tricks at her master's command. McCay's employer William Randolph Hearst curtailed his vaudeville activities, prompting McCay to add a live-action introductory sequence to the film for its theatrical release, which was renamed Winsor McCay, the Famous Cartoonist, and Gertie. McCay abandoned a sequel, Gertie on Tour (c. 1921), after producing about a minute of footage.

Although Gertie is popularly thought to be the earliest animated film, McCay had previously made Little Nemo (1911) and How a Mosquito Operates (1912). The American J. Stuart Blackton and the French Émile Cohl had experimented with animation even earlier. Gertie being a character with an appealing personality distinguished McCay's film from these earlier "trick films". Gertie was the first film to employ several animation techniques, like keyframes, registration marks, tracing paper, the Mutoscope action viewer, and animation loops. It influenced the next generation of animators, including the Fleischer brothers, Otto Messmer, Paul Terry, Walter Lantz, and Walt Disney. John Randolph Bray unsuccessfully tried to patent many of McCay's animation techniques. It is said to have been behind a plagiarized version of Gertie that appeared a year or two after the original. Gertie is the best preserved of McCay's films, some of which have been lost or survive only in fragments. In 1991, the U.S. Library of Congress selected the film for preservation in the National Film Registry for being "culturally, historically, or aesthetically significant".

== Background ==
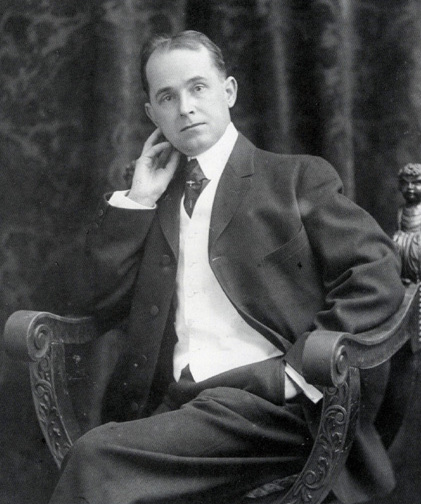
Winsor McCay (pictured in 1906) was a pioneer in comic strips and animation.

Winsor McCay (c. 1867/1871 – 1934) (Note: Different accounts have given McCay's birth year as 1867, 1869, and 1871. His birth records are not extant.) had already worked prolifically as a commercial artist and cartoonist by the time he began creating newspaper comic strips such as Dream of the Rarebit Fiend (1904–1911) (Note: Rarebit Fiend was revived between 1911 and 1913 under other titles, such as Midsummer Day Dreams and It Was Only a Dream.) and his signature strip Little Nemo (1905–1914). (Note: The strip was titled Little Nemo in Slumberland from 1905 to 1911, and In the Land of Wonderful Dreams from 1911 to 1914.) In 1906, McCay began performing on the vaudeville circuit as well, doing chalk talks—performances in which he drew pictures before live audiences.

Inspired by the flip books his son brought home, McCay recognized the potential to create "moving pictures" from his cartoons. He claimed to be the first man in the world to make animated cartoons, but he was preceded by the American James Stuart Blackton and the French Émile Cohl. McCay's first film starred his Little Nemo characters and debuted in movie theatres in 1911; he soon incorporated it into his vaudeville act. He followed it in 1912 with How a Mosquito Operates, in which a giant, naturalistically animated mosquito sucks the blood of a sleeping man. McCay gave the mosquito a personality and balanced humor with the horror of the nightmarish situation. His animation was criticized as being so lifelike that he must have traced the characters from photographs or resorted to tricks using wires. To show that he had not, McCay chose for his next film a creature that could not have been photographed.

In 1912, McCay consulted with the American Historical Society and announced plans to create a presentation featuring depictions of the great monsters that once roamed the earth. He spoke of the "serious and educational work" that the animation process could enable. McCay had earlier introduced dinosaurs into his comic strip work, like the March 4, 1905, (Note: Wikimedia Commons has a file available for this comic strip.) episode of Dream of the Rarebit Fiend in which a Brontosaurus skeleton took part in a horse race, and the May 25, 1913, (Note: Though the strip appeared in the Evening Telegram on May 25, 1913, it was drawn sometime between 1908 and 1911. Wikimedia Commons has a file available for this comic strip.) Rarebit Fiend episode in which a hunter unsuccessfully targets a dinosaur; the layout of the background to the latter bore a strong resemblance to what later appeared in Gertie. In the September 21, 1913, (Note: Wikimedia Commons has a file available for this comic strip.) episode of McCay's Little Nemo strip In the Land of Wonderful Dreams, titled "In the Land of the Antediluvians", Nemo meets a blue dinosaur named Bessie which has the same design as that of Gertie. (Note: McCay used dinosaurs in other strips as well, such as the August 21, 1910 (commons), and April 22, 1912, (commons) episodes of Dream of the Rarebit Fiend, and a 1906 Little Sammy Sneeze episode in which Sammy destroys a dinosaur skeleton with his sneeze.)

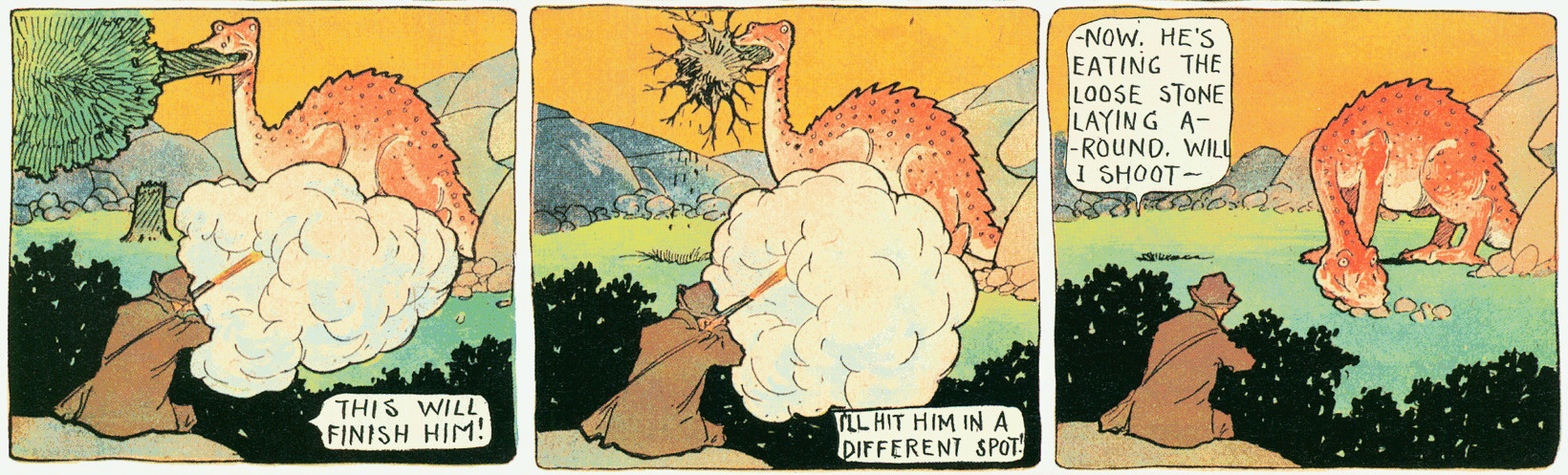
Long-necked dinosaurs often appeared in Dream of the Rarebit Fiend. (May 25, 1913) (Note: Wikimedia Commons has a file available for the complete strip.)

McCay considered several names before settling on "Gertie"; his production notebooks used "Jessie the Dinosaurus". Disney animator Paul Satterfield recalled hearing McCay in 1915 relate how he had chosen the name "Gertie":

He heard a couple of "sweet boys" [gay men] out in the hall talking to each other, and one of them said, "Oh, Bertie, wait a minute!" in a very sweet voice. He thought it was a good name, but wanted it to be a girl's name instead of a boy's, so he called it "Gertie".

— Paul Satterfield, interview with Milt Gray, 1977

== Content ==
Gertie the Dinosaur (1914)

Gertie the Dinosaur is the earliest animated film to feature a dinosaur. Its star, Gertie, performs tricks much like a trained elephant. She is animated in a naturalistic style unprecedented for the time: she breathes rhythmically, shifts her weight as she moves, and her abdominal muscles undulate as she draws water. McCay imbued her with a personality—while friendly, she could be capricious, ignoring or rebelling against her master's commands.

=== Synopsis ===
The frisky, childlike Gertie appears from a cave after being called by her master McCay, eating a boulder and a tree on the way. The whip-wielding McCay orders her to do tricks like raising her foot or bowing to the audience. After being distracted by a sea serpent, Gertie nips back at her master. McCay scolds Gertie for this, which makes her cry, and he subsequently placates her with a pumpkin. (Note: In the original vaudeville version, McCay used an apple rather than a pumpkin.) Gertie eats the leftover tree trunk, and tosses a mammoth named Jumbo into the lake; when Jumbo teases her by spraying her with water, she hurls a boulder at it as it swims away. After a flying lizard catches Gertie's attention, she quenches her thirst by draining the lake. McCay then has her carry him offstage while he bows to the audience.

In the live-action framing story added for later distribution, McCay and friends suffer a flat tire in front of the American Museum of Natural History. They enter the museum and, while viewing a Brontosaurus skeleton, McCay wagers a dinner that he can bring a dinosaur to life with his animation skills. The animation process and its "10,000 drawings, each a little different from the one preceding it" is put on display, (Note: David Nathan and Donald Crafton find the number 10,000 suspect, as that number of frames at 16 frames per second would result in 11 minutes of animation; extent copies of the theatrical version of the film, of which only one brief scene is known to be missing, have only seven minutes of animation. Taking cycling into account, even 11 minutes is a conservative estimate.) with humorous scenes of mountains of paper, some of which an assistant drops. When the film is finished, the friends gather to view it in a restaurant.

== Production ==
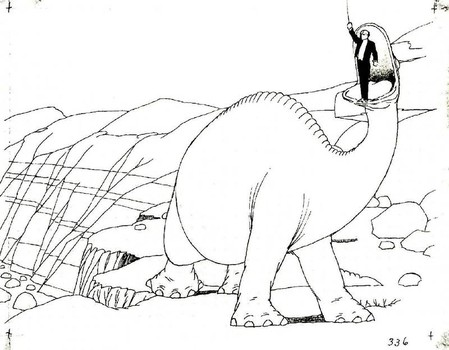
McCay used registration marks in the corners of the drawings to reduce jittering.

Gertie was McCay's first piece of animation with detailed backgrounds. Main production began in mid-1913. Working in his spare time, McCay drew thousands of frames of Gertie on 6 1/2-by-8 1/2-inch (17 cm × 22 cm) sheets of mulberry paper, a medium good for drawing as it did not absorb ink. Since it was translucent, it was also ideal for the laborious retracing of backgrounds, a job that fell to art student neighbor John A. Fitzsimmons. The drawings themselves occupied a 6-by-8-inch (15 cm × 20 cm) area of the paper, (Note: This was in the 1:1.33 aspect ratio that was standard for film at the time.) marked with registration marks in the corners to reduce jittering of the images when filmed. They were photographed mounted on large pieces of stiff cardboard.

McCay was concerned with accurate timing and motion; he timed his own breathing to determine the timing of Gertie's breathing, and included subtle details such as the ground sagging beneath Gertie's weight. McCay consulted with New York museum staff to ensure the accuracy of Gertie's movements; the staff were unable to help him find out how an extinct animal would stand up from a lying position, so in a scene in which Gertie stood up, McCay had a flying lizard come on screen to draw away viewers' attention. When the drawings were finished, they were photographed at Vitagraph Studios in early 1914.

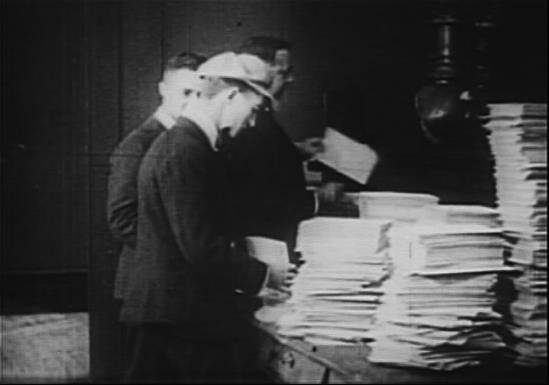
McCay's assistants preparing the thousands of drawings for the film, in a still from the film's introduction

McCay pioneered the "McCay Split System" of animation, in which major poses or positions were drawn first and the intervening frames drawn after. This relieved tedium and improved the timing of the film's actions. McCay was open about the techniques that he developed, and refused to patent his system, reportedly saying: "Any idiot that wants to make a couple of thousand drawings for a hundred feet of film is welcome to join the club." During production of Gertie, he showed the details to a visitor who claimed to be writing an article about animation. The visitor was animator John Randolph Bray, who sued McCay in 1914 after taking advantage of McCay's lapse to patent many of the techniques, including the use of registration marks, tracing paper, and the Mutoscope action viewer, as well as the cycling of drawings to create repetitive action. The suit was unsuccessful, and there is evidence that McCay may have countersued—he received royalty payments from Bray for licensing the techniques.

== Release ==
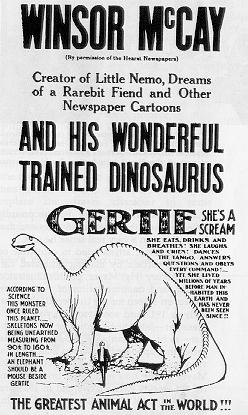
Advertisements educated audiences about dinosaurs.

Gertie the Dinosaur first appeared as part of McCay's vaudeville act in early 1914. It appeared in movie theaters in an edition with a live-action prologue, distributed by William Fox's Box Office Attractions Company from December 28. Dinosaurs were still new to the public imagination at the time of Gertie's release—a Brontosaurus skeleton was put on public display for the first time in 1905. Advertisements reflected this by trying to educate audiences: "According to science this monster once ruled this planet ... Skeletons [are] now being unearthed measuring from 90 ft. to 160 ft. in length. An elephant should be a mouse beside Gertie."

=== Vaudeville ===
McCay originally used a version of the film as part of his vaudeville act. (Note: There are no known extant copies of the vaudeville version of Gertie.) The first performance was on February 8, 1914, (Note: McCay registered the copyright for Gertie the Dinosaur on September 15, 1914.) in Chicago at the Palace Theater. McCay began the show making his customary live sketches, which he followed with How a Mosquito Operates. He then appeared on stage with a whip and lectured the audience on the making of animation. Standing to the right of the film screen, he introduced "the only dinosaur in captivity". As the film started, Gertie poked her head out of a cave, and McCay encouraged her to come forward. He reinforced the illusion with tricks such as tossing a cardboard apple at the screen, at which point he turned his back to the audience and pocketed the apple as it appeared in the film for Gertie to eat. (Note: In the theatrical version, the intertitles call the apple as a pumpkin.) For the finale, McCay walked offstage from where he "reappeared" in the film; Gertie lifted up the animated McCay, placed him on her back, and walked away as McCay bowed to the audience.

The show soon moved to New York. Though reviews were positive, McCay's employer at the New York American, newspaper magnate William Randolph Hearst, was displeased that his star cartoonist's vaudeville schedule interrupted his work illustrating editorials. At Hearst's orders, reviews of McCay's shows disappeared from the American's pages. Shortly after, Hearst refused to run paid advertisements from the Victoria Theater, where McCay performed in New York. On March 8, Hearst announced a ban on artists in his employ from performing in vaudeville. McCay's contract did not prohibit him from his vaudeville performances, but Hearst was able to pressure McCay and his agents to cancel bookings, and eventually McCay signed a new contract barring him from performing outside of greater New York.

=== Movie theaters ===
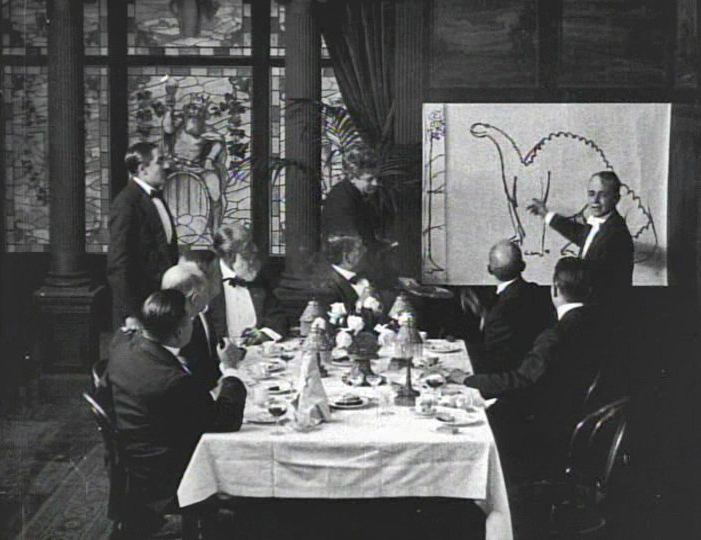
McCay sketches Gertie for his colleagues in a live-action sequence made for the film's theatrical release, at the American Museum of Natural History.

In November 1914, film producer William Fox offered to market Gertie the Dinosaur to moving-picture theaters for "spot cash and highest prices". McCay accepted, and extended the film to include a live-action prologue (Note: It is not known when the live-action sequences were filmed.) and intertitles to replace his stage patter. The film successfully traveled the country and had reached the west coast by December.

The live-action sequence was likely shot on November 19, 1914. It features McCay with several of his friends, such as cartoonists George McManus and Tad Dorgan, writer Roy McCardell, and actor Tom Powers; McCay's son Robert had a cameo as a camera-room assistant. McCay used a bet as a plot device, as he had previously in the Little Nemo film.

=== 2018 reconstruction of McCay's vaudeville act ===
Using extant original drawings by McCay, David L. Nathan reconstructed the lost "Encore" sequence from McCay's original vaudeville version. He initiated a restoration of the entire film and, with animation historian Donald Crafton, proposed a reconstruction of McCay's vaudeville performance. Crafton, Nathan and Marco de Blois of the Cinémathèque québécoise worked with a team of professionals from the National Film Board of Canada to complete the project, which premiered live during the closing ceremony of the 2018 Annecy International Animated Film Festival in France.

== McCay and animation after Gertie ==
McCay's working method was laborious, and animators developed methods to reduce the workload and speed production to meet the demand for animated films. Within a few years of Nemo's release, Canadian Raoul Barré's registration pegs combined with American Earl Hurd's cel technology became near-universal methods in animation studios. McCay used cel technology in his follow-up to Gertie, The Sinking of the Lusitania (1918). It was his most ambitious film at 25,000 drawings, and took nearly two years to complete, but was not a commercial success.

Fragment of Gertie on Tour (c. 1921)

Around 1921, McCay worked on a second animated film featuring Gertie, titled Gertie on Tour. The film was to have Gertie bouncing on the Brooklyn Bridge in New York, attempting to eat the Washington Monument in Washington, D.C., wading in on the Atlantic City shore, and other scenes. The film exists only in concept sketches and in two minutes of film footage in which Gertie plays with a trolley and dances before other dinosaurs.

McCay made six more films, though three of them were never made commercially available. After 1921, McCay was made to give up animation when Hearst learned he devoted more of his time to animation than to his newspaper illustrations. Unexecuted ideas McCay had for animation projects included a collaboration with Jungle Imps author George Randolph Chester, a musical film called The Barnyard Band, and a film about the Americans' role in World War I.

In 1927, McCay attended a dinner in his honor in New York. After a considerable amount of drinking, McCay was introduced by animator Max Fleischer. McCay gave the gathered group of animators some technical advice, but when he felt the audience was not giving him attention, he berated them, saying: "Animation is an art. That is how I conceived it. But as I see, what you fellows have done with it, is making it into a trade. Not an art, but a trade. Bad Luck!" That September he appeared on the radio at WNAC, and on November 2 Frank Craven interviewed him for The Evening Journal's Woman's Hour. During both appearances he complained about the state of contemporary animation. McCay died on July 26, 1934, of a cerebral embolism.

== Reception and legacy ==
=== Reviews ===
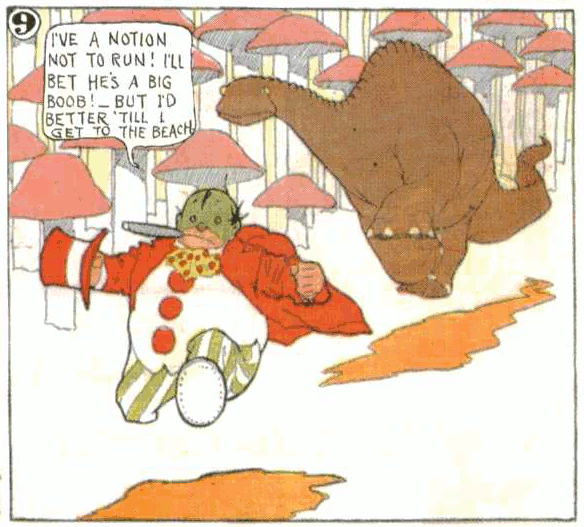
A Gertie-like dinosaur appeared in In the Land of Wonderful Dreams on September 21, 1913.

Gertie pleased audiences and reviewers. It won the praise of drama critic Ashton Stevens in Chicago, where the act opened. On February 22, 1914, before Hearst had barred the New York American from mentioning McCay's vaudeville work, a columnist in the paper called the act "a laugh from start to finish ... far funnier than his noted mosquito drawings". On February 28, the New York Evening Journal called it "the greatest act in the history of motion picture cartoonists". Émile Cohl praised McCay's "admirably drawn" films, and Gertie in particular, after seeing them in New York before he returned to Europe. Upon its theatrical release, Variety magazine wrote the film had "plenty of comedy throughout" and that it would "always be remarked upon as exceptionally clever". In 1994, Gertie the Dinosaur was voted number six of the 50 Greatest Cartoons by members of the animation field.

New York Times film critic Richard Eder, on seeing a retrospective of McCay's animation at the Whitney Museum of American Art in 1975, wrote of Gertie that "Disney ... struggled mightily to recapture" the qualities in McCay's animation, but that "Disney's magic, though sometimes scary, was always contained; McCay's approached necromancy". Eder compared McCay's artistic vision to that of poet William Blake, saying that "it was too strange and personal to be generalized or to have any children".

Gertie has been written about in numerous books and articles. Animation historian Donald Crafton called Gertie "the enduring masterpiece of pre-Disney animation". Brothers Simon and Kim Deitch loosely based their graphic novel The Boulevard of Broken Dreams (2002) on McCay's disillusionment with the animation industry in the 1920s. The story features an aged cartoonist named Winsor Newton, (Note: "Winsor Newton" is wordplay on "Winsor McCay" and "Winsor & Newton", a brand of art supplies.) who in his younger years had a Gertie-like stage act featuring a mastodon named Milton. Gertie has been selected for preservation in the U.S. Library of Congress' National Film Registry.

=== Legacy ===
A fake version of Gertie the Dinosaur appeared a year or two after the original; it features a dinosaur performing most of Gertie's tricks, but with less skillful animation, using cels on a static background. It is not known for certain who produced the film, though its style is believed to be that of Bray Productions. Filmmaker Buster Keaton rode the back of a clay-animated dinosaur in homage to Gertie in Three Ages (1923).

McCay's first three films were the earliest animated works to have a commercial impact; their success motivated film studios to join the infant animation industry. Other studios used McCay's combination of live action with animation, such as the Fleischer Studios series Out of the Inkwell (1918–1929) and Walt Disney's Alice Comedies series (1923–1927). McCay's clean-line, high-contrast, realistic style set the pattern for American animation to come, and set it apart from the abstract, open forms of animation in Europe. This legacy is most apparent in the feature films of the Walt Disney Animation Studios, such as Fantasia (1940), which included anthropomorphic dinosaurs animated in a naturalistic style with careful attention to timing and weight. Shamus Culhane, Dave and Max Fleischer, Walter Lantz, Otto Messmer, Pat Sullivan, Paul Terry, and Bill Tytla were among the generation of American animators who drew inspiration from the films they saw in McCay's vaudeville act. Gertie's reputation was such that animation histories long named it as the first animated film.

Since his death, McCay's original artwork has been poorly preserved. Much was destroyed in a late-1930s house fire, and more was sold off when the McCays needed money. About 400 original drawings from the film have been preserved, discovered by animator Robert Brotherton in disarray in Irving Mendelsohn's fabric shop, into whose care McCay's films and artwork had been entrusted in the 1940s. Besides some cels from The Sinking of the Lusitania, these Gertie drawings are the only original animation artwork of McCay's to have survived. McCay destroyed many of his original cans of film to create more storage space. Of what he kept, not much has survived, as it was photographed on 35 mm (1.4 in) nitrate film, which deteriorates and is flammable. A pair of young animators discovered the film in 1947 and preserved what they could. In many cases only fragments could be saved, if anything at all. Of all of McCay's films, Gertie is the best preserved, and has been kept in the U.S. Library of Congress' National Film Registry as being "culturally, historically, or aesthetically significant" since 1991. Mendelsohn and Brotherton tried fruitlessly to find an institution to store McCay's films until the Cinémathèque québécoise, a Canadian film conservatory, approached them in 1967 on the occasion of that year's World Animation Film Exposition in Montreal. The Cinémathèque québécoise has since curated McCay's films. (Note: On the indifference of American institutions to the task, John Canemaker quotes children's book illustrator Maurice Sendak: "America 'still doesn't take its great fantasists all that seriously.'") Of the surviving drawings, fifteen have been determined not to appear in extant copies of the film. They appear to come from a single sequence, likely at the close of the film, and have Gertie showing her head from the audience's right and giving a bow.

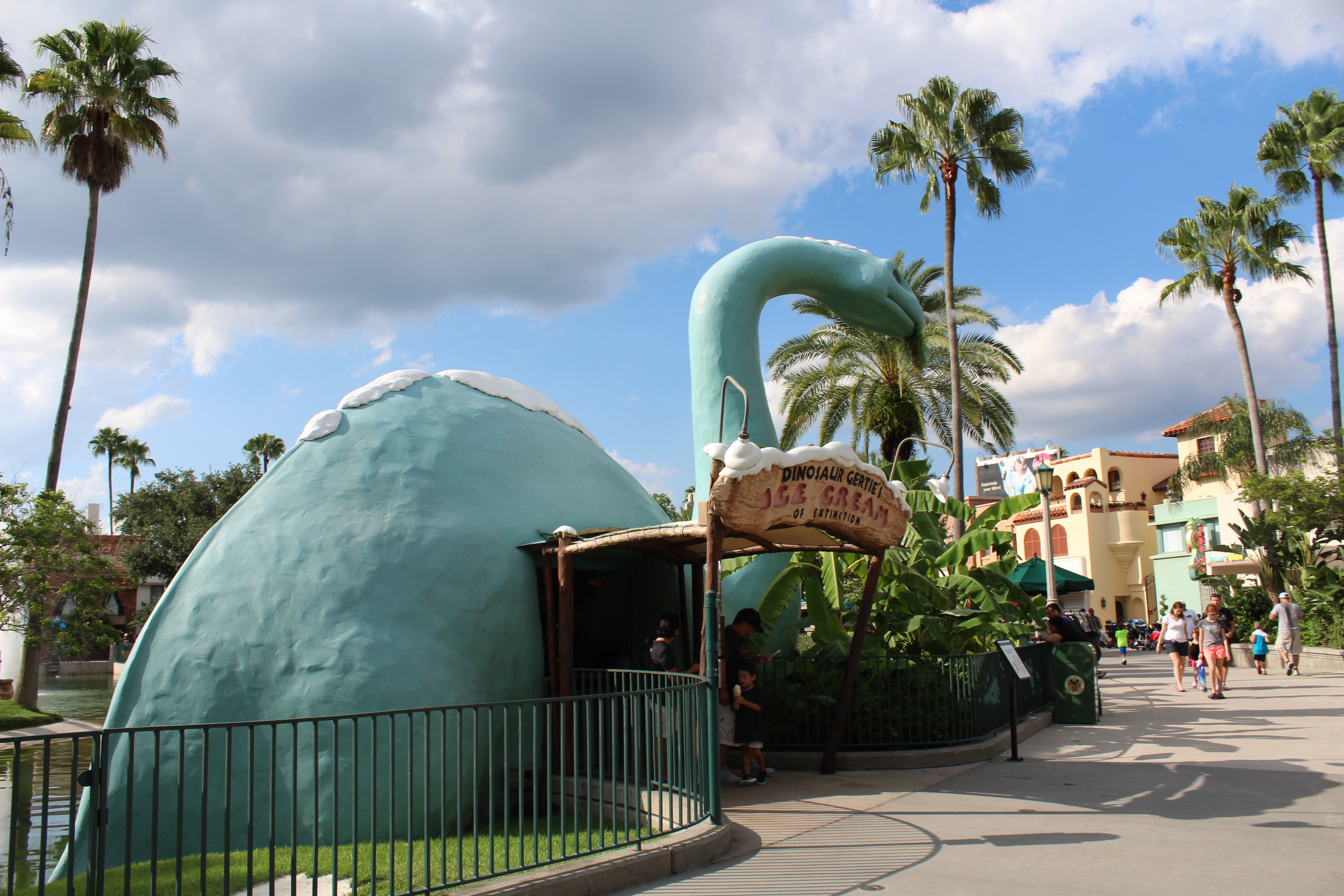
Gertie's ice cream stand at Disney's Hollywood Studios

McCay's son Robert unsuccessfully attempted to revive Gertie with a comic strip called Dino. He and Disney animator Richard Huemer recreated the original vaudeville performance for the Disneyland television program in 1955; this was the first exposure the film had for that generation. Walt Disney expressed to the younger McCay his feeling of debt, and gestured to the Disney studios saying, "Bob, all this should be your father's." An ice cream shop in the shape of Gertie sits by Echo Lake in Disney's Hollywood Studios at Walt Disney World. The first known specimen of the dinosaur Chindesaurus, discovered in Arizona's Petrified Forest National Park in 1985, has been nicknamed Gertie after the cartoon, although unlike Gertie, Chindesaurus is not a sauropod.

== See also ==
- Animation in the United States during the silent era
- Film preservation
- List of films featuring dinosaurs
- List of animated films in the public domain in the United States
- The Enchanted Drawing
- The Land Before Time
