= Sol Hess (writer) =

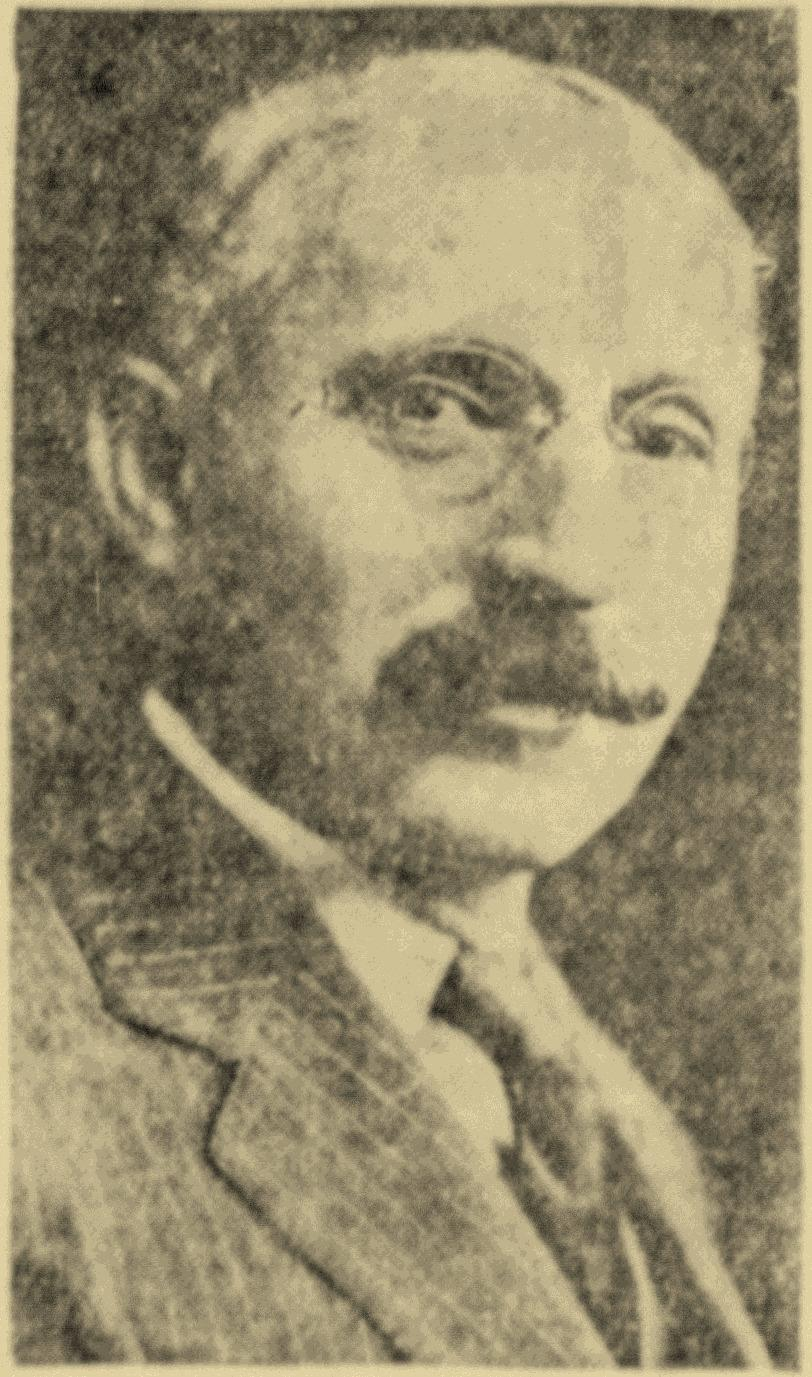

Sol Hess (October 14, 1872 – December 31, 1941) was a comic strip writer best known for creating the long-run strip The Nebbs with animation artist Wallace Carlson.

Born on an Illinois farm, Hess moved with his parents to Chicago, where a short time later, his father died. He took a job as a traveling salesman for a wholesale jewelry company and became a successful jeweler with Rettif, Hess & Madsen, a prominent firm. The company office was located near the Chicago Tribune, and Hess became friendly with the Tribune journalists and comic strip cartoonists.

He entered the comics field as an amateur writer, receiving no pay for the gags he supplied to the cartoonists. Sidney Smith created The Gumps in 1917, and two years later, he started using Hess' dialogue and ideas.

== The Nebbs ==
In 1922, after Smith signed a million-dollar contract ($100,000 per year for ten years), Hess felt he was due a significant share as writer. When Smith offered him only $100 a week, a bitter Hess decided to create his own comic strip, earning $800 a week after he teamed with cartoonist Carlson to launch The Nebbs on May 22, 1923. Carlson had been animating The Gumps for John Randolph Bray in 1919, and while the series was not successful, it brought Carlson in contact with Hess, and the two struck up a friendship. Carlson's career as animator ended with his last Gumps short, Fatherly Love (1921). The Nebbs closely paralleled The Gumps, although the character of Junior Nebb bore a strong resemblance to an earlier Carlson character, Dreamy Dud. With a situation and characters not unlike The Gumps, the strip caught on with readers and quickly became popular, enabling Hess to leave the jewelry business in 1925.

Comics historian Don Markstein described the characters:

Even the name was Gumps-like. "Gump" was a word Tribune Syndicate chief Joseph M. Patterson used for a member of the Unwashed Masses. The name Nebb was short for "nebbish", a Yiddish word for the sort of person who doesn't stand out in any way. Dad Rudy (no relation) wasn't a loser type, but he did think more highly of himself than an objective observer would be likely to do. Mom Fanny was a typical domestic type, the family power center but in a low-key way. Young son Junior was a lot like Chester Gump, but he did have an occasional fabulous adventure, such as joining a circus and touring with them for months. Teenage daughter Betsy, a typical young woman of the flapper era, was the only one who didn't have an analog in the other strip. Despite its similarity to an established property, The Nebbs caught on and appeared in about 500 papers. In fact, it was in most of the Hearst papers, despite being distributed by a rival of Hearst's King Features Syndicate, because William Randolph Hearst himself liked it. But it never reached the stellar heights of The Gumps. There were a few Big Little Books in the 1930s, a short-lived radio show in the mid-'40s, and not much else in the way of merchandising or media spin-offs.

Interviewed in 1929, Hess talked about his characters and finding humor in real-life situations:

Where does he get his ideas? From life, he said, and for that reason he must be very observing at all times to see the little things that happen at home, on the streets, among his friends, that may be incorporated into a strip of Nebbs. "The characters! Oh, they are entirely imaginary," he declared. "I haven't taken them from life at all. It is just the things that they do that are little glimpses of real life."

== Reprints ==
Cupples & Leon collected The Nebbs into a 1928 book. Dell published The Nebbs comic book in 1941, and four years later, Croydon Publishing printed a single issue of The Nebbs comic book (1945). Through Chicago's Artists and Creators Guild, Hess issued a Nebbs Bridge Scorepad in 1932. Other merchandising included bisque statuettes and a Nebbs board game.

== Radio ==
Heard on the Mutual Broadcasting System in 1945, The Nebbs radio series aired on Sunday afternoons. It featured Gene Lockhart as Rudy Nebbs and Kathleen Lockhart as Fanny Nebbs. Others in the cast were Ruth Perrott, Francis "Dink" Trout and Dick Ryan.

== The Toodle Family ==
With Hess's death in 1941, the scripts for The Nebbs were taken over by his daughter, Betsy Hess, and her husband, Stanley Baer. They ran another strip called The Toodle Family. In 1955, the two strips merged into a single series.

== Death ==
Hess died at his apartment at the Shoreland Hotel, in Chicago, of a heart attack, on December 31, 1941.

== See also ==
- The Nebbishes
