= Wallace Carlson =

American cartoonist

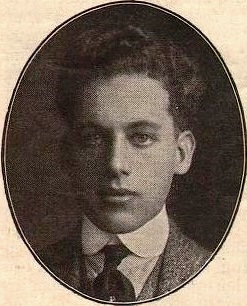
Carlson in 1915

PLAY: Dreamy Dud – He Resolves Not to Smoke (1915); running time 05:06.

PLAY: Dud Leaves Home (1919); running time 04:59.

PLAY: How Animated Cartoons Are Made (1919); running time 09:52.

PLAY: Andy's Dog Day (1921), which features the character Andy Gump, who is repeatedly harassed by dogs; running time 05:54.

Wallace A. Carlson (March 28, 1894 – May 9, 1967) was a pioneering American animator and comic strip artist based in Chicago. Known to his friends as Wally Carlson, he usually signed his work as Wallace Carlson.

== Biography ==
Born in St. Louis, Missouri, Carlson moved with his family in 1905 to Chicago, where he took a job at the Chicago Inter Ocean newspaper as a copy boy. Soon he was contributing cartoons to the paper. Some time after the newspaper folded, Carlson created his first animated cartoon, Joe Boko Breaking Into the Big League (1914) completely on his own, the same year as Winsor McCay's Gertie the Dinosaur. The success of this short gained the attention of the Essanay Film Manufacturing Company, who engaged Carlson to create a series, Canimated Nooz Pictorials, that was combined into their newsreels. At first the character Joe Boko continued from the older subject, but shortly Carlson introduced Dreamy Dud, a winsome lad whose daydreams gets him into various troublesome situations. Carlson's Dreamy Dud pictures remain his best known work in posterity.

In 1917, Carlson began to work for John Randolph Bray and developed other characters, including Otto Luck and Goodrich Dirt, the latter being a short, squat bearded hobo in ragged clothes who seemed to have perpetual bad luck. When Carlson introduced the Us Fellers series at Bray in 1919, it provided him the opportunity to bring back Dreamy Dud, who was the main focus of these subjects.

== The Nebbs ==
Carlson took over animating the popular strip The Gumps for Bray in 1919, and while the series was not successful, Carlson struck up a friendship with writer Sol Hess, a close friend to The Gumps' cartoonist Sidney Smith. Carlson's career as animator ended with his last Gumps short, Fatherly Love (1921). In the spring of 1923, he and Hess rolled out The Nebbs, a strip modeled very closely on The Gumps, although Junior Nebb bore an uncanny resemblance to Dreamy Dud. Although not as well remembered today as The Gumps, The Nebbs was an extremely successful strip and ran in more than 500 newspapers, spawning a short-lived radio series in the 1940s.

With Hess' death in 1941, the scripts for The Nebbs were taken over by his daughter, Betsy Hess and her husband, Stanley Baer. They ran another strip called The Toodle Family, and by 1947, The Nebbs had been folded into the newer comic as subsidiary characters. Shortly before that, Carlson had gone into retirement. He died in Chicago in 1967.

== Legacy ==
Although Wallace Carlson's early and late careers as a newspaper cartoonist added up to some 30 years of activity, it is for his animation that he is remembered; in just seven years Carlson made over 100 cartoons, albeit short ones of the split-reel variety. Most of these are either lost or otherwise unaccounted for, though several of his titles were circulated in the home 16mm market of the 1920s and 30s and newly discovered ones continue to be located periodically. The earlier, freely drawn Essanay titles tend to be more interesting than later Bray subjects as the recycled cel backdrops and the demand of producing cartoons at the rate which Bray preferred tended to compromise their quality. Nevertheless, Carlson belongs to the first generation of American animators and his work retains considerable interest in its close visual relationship to comic strip art and imaginative flights of fancy, particularly in the Dreamy Dud series.

== Confirmed extant films ==
- Dreamy Dud. He Resolves Not to Smoke (1915)
- Dreamy Dud Sees Charlie Chaplin (1915)
- Otto Luck to the Rescue (1917)
- Goodrich Dirt, Cow Puncher (1918)
- Goodrich Dirt, the Cop (1918)
- Goodrich Dirt, Coin Collector (1918)
- Goodrich Dirt, Hypnotist (1919)
- Goodrich Dirt Sleeps and Spot Goes Romeo-ing (1919)
- Dud, the Circus Performer (1919)
- Ol' Swimming Hole (1919)
- Dud's Home Run (1919)
- Dud Leaves Home (1919)
- A Chip Off the Old Block (1919)
- Dud, the Lion Tamer (1920)
- Wim and Wiggor (1920)
- Mixing Business with Pleasure (1920)
- Andy's Cow (1921)
- At least one unidentified Gumps short (1920–1921)

== Sources ==
- Donald Crafton, Before Mickey. University of Chicago Press, 1993.
- Jeff Lenburg, Who's Who in Animated Cartoons. Applause, 2006.
