= The Loose Nut =

- Directed by: James Culhane
- Story by: Ben Hardaway; Milt Schaffer
- Produced by: Walter Lantz
- Starring: Ben Hardaway; Will Wright
- Music by: Darrell Calker
- Animation by: Laverne Harding; Emery Hawkins; Pat Matthews; Grim Natwick; Les Kline; Paul Smith
- Backgrounds by: Terry Lind
- Color process: Technicolor
- Production company: Walter Lantz Productions
- Distributed by: Universal Pictures
- Release date: December 17, 1945
- Running time: 6:53
- Country: United States
- Language: English

The Loose Nut is an animated short film directed by James Culhane. It was released on December 17, 1945, and features Woody Woodpecker. It was produced by Walter Lantz Productions and distributed by Universal Pictures.

The short is the first cartoon to pin Woody against a burly man named Bull Dozer. Dozer would later reappear as Woody's foe in Woodpecker in the Rough from 1952 as a golfer, and in Wrestling Wrecks from 1953 as a wrestler.

== Plot ==
A construction worker named Bull Dozer is cementing a sidewalk and is pretty proud of himself. Meanwhile, Woody is playing golf in a tree. He putters the ball which lands in the wet cement. Dozer, furious, gives Woody his golf ball back. It turns out that Woody made foot tracks in the cement, and Dozer forces Woody to smooth them out. He takes two of the spreaders and put on his feet like ice skates. Woody skates out the tracks he made. Dozer soon makes a ball of wet cement and throws it at Woody, causing him to crash. Woody then emerges from the ball, takes a mallet and putters the ball of cement into the Dozer's face. Dozer is now trapped in the wet cement. Woody then skates back over to the man and repeatedly hits him with a shovel.

Woody then tries to run Bull Dozer over with a steamroller. He runs in fear from the woodpecker and is chased out of the cement. He is chased into the construction office and hides, only to open the door and get run down. Dozer is completely flat and Woody rolls him up. He then takes him over to an advertisement for the gym with a picture of a fat woman on a billboard and pastes him on there like a sticker before running off. Dozer emerges from the billboard, but with the backside of the fat woman.

Bull Dozer tries to grab Woody's golf club, only to be accidentally knocked underground. Woody discovers the ball in the man's mouth. He putters it anyway and sends the man's dentures flying. Dozer chases Woody up a ladder, but is hit in the head by Woody with a mallet. He falls down and Woody drops a barrel on Dozer. He replaces Woody's golf ball with a bomb that looks the same as one and blows up both of the characters. Woody, now featherless, still holds a high spirit and does his trademark laugh before being chased through the wet sidewalk, ruining it once again.

== Voice cast ==
- Ben Hardaway as Woody Woodpecker
- Will Wright as Bull Dozer

== Production notes ==
The Loose Nut is notable for its climatic sequence, animated by Pat Matthews, in which Woody runs over Bull Dozer with a steam roller, which included haphazard camera angles, rapid jump cuts and stylistic explosion effects, depicted with red, blue and yellow paint strokes. Loyola Marymount University professor and Animation program Chair Tom Klein commented on the scene (as well as an explosion in the end of the cartoon) to be unusually avant-garde in style, saying "Culhane punked the Cartoonland status quo and slipped in flicker films of abstract art. These appeared as explosions during The Loose Nut, playing to millions of American moviegoers... The infectious spirit of the American Contemporary Gallery was pulsing its way into the Hollywood pipeline". Culhane was said to have been greatly influenced by avant-garde-like techniques by Russian filmmakers, as well as contemporary art and films by Fritz Lang and Jean Renoir, which resulted in him translating those influences into his cartoons.

Beginning with The Loose Nut, the "00's" in Woody's name in the opening log sequence have been changed to nut screws.
