= The Police Dog =

Short film series

The Police Dog is an animated cartoon series created by Bray Studios, who produced twelve shorts from 1914 to 1918.

== History ==
The series was created by Carl Anderson, a first-generation Norwegian-American cartoonist born in Madison, Wisconsin in 1865. He was one of the oldest staff members at Bray Studios and was 14 years older than the studio's owner.

Although Anderson had considered making an animated adaptation of his earlier comic strip The Filipino and the Chick (also known as Little Filipino and the Chick), nothing ever came of the idea and the Police Dog series was Anderson's main project at Bray Studios. Originally, Anderson made Pinkerton Pup a more realistic dog, but he got more anthropomorphic over time. The series ran from 1914-1918.

Anderson subsequently returned to his cartooning career, and in 1932 created the pantomime comic strip Henry, the work he is best remembered for today.

== Characters ==
- Pinkerton Pup - a police dog who always managed to get his owner Officer Piffles in trouble. He was described as "one of the most popular of comedians because he refuses to take life seriously".
- Officer Piffles - Pinkerton's owner who always gets in trouble.

== Filmography ==
The Police Dog ran from November 21, 1914 to February 25, 1918 with 12 shorts.

=== 1914 ===
- The Police Dog (November 21, 1914)

=== 1915 ===
- The Police Dog No. 2 (February 20, 1915)
- The Police Dog No. 3 (March 27, 1915)
- The Police Dog No. 4 (May 1, 1915)
- The Police Dog No. 5 (June 12, 1915)
- The Police Dog Gets Piffles In Bad (July 24, 1915)
- The Police Dog to the Rescue (September 25, 1915)

=== 1916 ===
- Police Dog On the Wire (January 27, 1916)
- Police Dog Turns Nurse (April 2, 1916)
- Police Dog in the Park (May 7, 1916)
- Working Out with the Police Dog (June 6, 1916)

=== 1918 ===
- The Pinkerton Pup's Portrait (February 25, 1918)
