= Shamus Culhane =

American animator (1908–1996)

- Born: James H. Culhane; November 12, 1908; Ware, Massachusetts, U.S.
- Died: February 2, 1996 (aged 87); New York City, U.S.
- Other names: James Culhane; Jimmie Culhane; Jimmy Culhane
- Years active: 1925–1996
- Employer(s): Bray Productions (1925–1928); Winkler Pictures (1928–1929); Fleischer Studios (1929–1932, 1939–1942); Animated Pictures (1932–1934); The Van Beuren Corporation (1934–1935); Walt Disney Productions (1935–1939); Leon Schlesinger Productions (1942–1943); Walter Lantz Productions (1943–1945); Shamus Culhane Productions (1945–66); Paramount Cartoon Studios (1966–1967)
- Spouses: Maxine Marx; Juana Hegarty
- Children: 2
- Awards: Winsor McCay Award, 1986

James H. "Shamus" Culhane (November 12, 1908 – February 2, 1996) was an American animator, film director, and film producer. He is best known for his work in the Golden age of American animation.

== Career ==
Culhane was a friend of Michael Lantz, whose brother Walter was working for Bray Productions as a director on the Dinky Doodle series. After graduating from high school, he found work at Bray under Michael's recommendation and animated until Lantz left. After Bray he served as an inker on Ben Harrison's and Manny Gould's Krazy Kat cartoons before moving to Fleischer Studios in 1929 after producer Charles Mintz did not retain him upon transferring the studio to Hollywood. Culhane is known for promoting the animation talents of his inker/assistant at Fleischer in the early 1930s, Lillian Friedman Astor, making her the first female studio animator. After serving as director on several Talkartoons and early Betty Boop shorts, Culhane moved to Hollywood to animate at Animated Pictures, operated by influential former Disney alumnus Ub Iwerks, under which he directed, alongside his longtime colleague and friend Al Eugster, several ComiColor Cartoons. On departing Iwerks's studio, Culhane briefly returned to New York to direct at the reorganized Van Beuren Corporation, then supervised by Burt Gillett, before opting to apply to Disney in 1935.

While at the Disney studio, he discovered while working on Hawaiian Holiday's crab sequence an animation method that involved stewing for multiple days, before drawing the entire thing in rough sketches all at once, straight ahead. He was a lead animator on Snow White and the Seven Dwarfs, animating arguably the most well-known sequence in the film, the animation of the dwarves marching home singing "Heigh-Ho". The scene took Culhane and his assistants six months to complete. During this time he developed his "High-speed" technique of animating with quick dashed-off sketches.

He also worked as an animator on Pinocchio, where he worked on Honest John and Gideon. However, he was left uncredited on the film. During the production of the film he left Disney for a second tenure at Fleischer Studios. While there, he worked as an animator on several crowd scenes in Gulliver's Travels and as the uncredited co-director on Mr. Bug Goes to Town. Following the completion of Gulliver, Culhane was assigned his own unit, which he attempted to instill with the artistic principles and ethos he had acquired at Disney, yielding shorts such as Popeye Meets William Tell, notable for their unusually fluid and expressive character animation relative to much of Fleischer's previous work.

A year following his departure from Fleischer, Culhane worked briefly in the units of Chuck Jones and Frank Tashlin at Leon Schlesinger Productions, before moving on to being a director for Walter Lantz Productions. At Lantz, he collaborated on The Greatest Man in Siam with the layout artist (and former Disney and Chuck Jones alumnus) Art Heinemann. In that animation, "the king of Siam bolts past doorways that are distinctly phallic in shape and peers at another that mimics a vagina." Later the same year he helmed Woody Woodpecker's classic The Barber of Seville. The cartoon debuted a new streamlined design for the woodpecker, and is also known for featuring one of the first uses of fast cutting, after taking the idea from Sergei Eisenstein. At Lantz, he sporadically introduced Russian avant-garde influenced experimental art into the cartoons; one example is briefly visible during an explosion in the Woody Woodpecker short The Loose Nut.

Culhane departed Lantz in October 1945 following a pay dispute. Following a succession of aborted projects, he returned to New York in 1948 to found Shamus Culhane Productions (Culhane had gone by his birthname of James up until this point, before going by its Irish variant Shamus), one of the first companies to create animated television commercials, among them an iconic Muriel Cigars commercial featuring a Mae West caricature stylized as a cigar. It also produced the animation for at least one of the Bell Telephone Science Series films. Shamus Culhane Productions folded in the 1960s, at which point Culhane became the head of the successor to Fleischer Studios, Paramount Cartoon Studios. He left the studio in 1967, ceding its creative supervision to a young Ralph Bakshi, and went into semi-retirement.

== Post-animation career ==
Culhane wrote two highly regarded books on animation: the how-to/textbook Animation from Script to Screen, and his autobiography Talking Animals and Other People. Since Culhane worked for a number of major Hollywood animation studios, his autobiography gives a balanced general overview of the history of the Golden age of American animation.

At his death on February 2, 1996, Culhane was survived by his fourth wife, the former Juana Hegarty, and by two sons from his third marriage, to Maxine Marx (the daughter of Chico Marx): Brian Culhane of Seattle and Kevin Marx Culhane of Portland, Oregon.
