= The Nebbishes =

American comic strip by Herb Gardner (1959–1961)

A panel from Herb Gardner's 1959-61 comic strip, The Nebbishes.

The Nebbishes was a syndicated Sunday comic strip by Herb Gardner, who is better known as a playwright and screenwriter. The strip was syndicated by the McNaught Syndicate from January 4, 1959, to January 29, 1961.

Gardner's characters were white blob-like creatures who expressed their attitude toward existence in mottos and quotes on greeting cards and statuettes. In the comic strip they engaged in dialogue in balloons in the standard comic strip format. Gardner first began drawing these characters while he was a student at Antioch College. As an English word from Yiddish, "nebbish" means an insignificant, pitiful person; a nonentity (from Yiddish interjection nebekh "poor thing!", and from Czech nebohý).

On local New York television, Gardner drew The Nebbishes on Shari Lewis' WPIX Kartoon Klub show, as noted by Kevin S. Butler:

Long before he became one of Broadway's most prolific playwrights, Herb Gardner was a comic strip artist for the New York Daily News. Mr. Gardner was invited to appear on Kartoon Klub where he engaged members of the studio audience and home viewers in chalk talks (he would draw pictures on a drawing pad to help illustrate his stories about an unusual group of creatures known as The Nebbishes). The segment was so successful that on Saturday evening, September 23, 1956, the program's title was changed to Shari & Her Friends.

Even before syndication, the Gardner characters were a national craze, appearing on studio cards, matchbook covers, barware (including cocktail napkins) and wall decorations. In 1954, Bernad Creations published Gardner's characters on greeting cards, posters and figurines. The most famous of these showed two slacker Nebbishes relaxing with feet on a table and the line, "Next week we've got to get organized!" First a greeting card and then a poster, the cartoon was so popular that the gagline soon became a national catchphrase independent of the image.

Gardner's autobiographical novel, A Piece of the Action (1958), has a thinly-disguised recounting of the creation and marketing of his characters.

Gardner's comic strip was picked up by the Chicago Tribune and syndicated to 60-75 major newspapers. The strip ran Sundays only from 1959 to 1961.

In 1960, after "the [speech] balloons were getting larger and larger, and there was hardly any drawing left", Gardner dropped the strip when he began writing plays.

== See also ==
- The Nebbs
