= The Debut of Thomas Cat =

1920 film

- Produced by: Earl Hurd
- Production company: Bray Pictures
- Release date: February 8, 1920
- Country: United States
- Language: Silent

The Debut of Thomas Cat (also spelled Kat and Katt in various sources) was the first color animated cartoon made in the United States. It was produced by Earl Hurd for Bray Pictures using the Brewster Color film process, and was released on February 8, 1920. This film is lost.

== Plot ==
The plot involves a kitten encountering a rat for the first time, rather than the mice it is used to.

== Reception ==
Despite favorable reviews, Bray Pictures deemed the process to be too expensive, and did not employ it again.

== Availability ==
The film is lost. No visual evidence of it is known to have survived.
