= Andy Luckey =

American animator, designer and writer (born 1965)

- Born: Andrew A. Luckey; October 7, 1965 (age 61); San Francisco, California, U.S.
- Education: California State University Northridge; Talbot School of Theology
- Occupations: Animator; artist; author; designer; director; illustrator; television producer
- Years active: 1989–present
- Parents: Bud Luckey (father); Constance Hurd Gerttula (mother)
- Relatives: Earl Hurd (cousin 2x removed)

Andrew A. Luckey (born October 7, 1965) is an American animator, artist, author, designer, director, illustrator and television producer, primarily of animated works. He also writes and illustrates children's books and Bible studies. Luckey has produced over 300 hours of programming, most notably as a producer on the animated series Teenage Mutant Ninja Turtles and Adventures from the Book of Virtues. He is the founder of Greater Family, LLC, and the author and illustrator of the children's book series Spin & Sparkle.

He is the son of animator, director and voice actor Bud Luckey (1934–2018) and a maternal cousin, twice removed, of animator Earl Hurd (1880–1940), who co-created and patented the process for cel animation.

== Early life and education ==
Luckey was trained in animation early in life by his father, animator Bud Luckey, at his family's studio in San Francisco. He attended Admiral Farragut Academy for one year with the ambition to pursue a career as a Naval Officer, but transferred to Redwood High School, where he was two years ahead of future California governor Gavin Newsom. After graduating in 1983, he began attending College of Marin, initially as a pre-med/biology student before deciding to pursue filmmaking and screenwriting instead after taking organic chemistry. In 1986, he enrolled at California State University Northridge, joining the Sigma Nu fraternity, Iota Upsilon chapter, and entering what was then known as the Radio-Television Film (RTVF) program. There, he was mentored by his faculty advisor Alan Armer and studied under Nat Perrin, Tom Burrows, Peter Stearn, Irving Pearlberg, and Sidney Salkow. Another key influence on Luckey while in school was Benjamin Brady, the former president of ABC Television. Luckey received his B.A. in Media Management in 1988.

After a decade in the workforce, Luckey enrolled in Biola University's Talbot School of Theology in 1998, earning his Master of Divinity degree in 2001. During this time, he worked as a youth pastor and college and career pastor for several churches in Southern California.

== Career ==
Following high school, Luckey briefly worked as a Visual Effects Designer for Audio Vision Projects. While there, he co-designed the visual effects for MTV's "Turn of the Century" music video, which featured Yes and Jon Anderson. After graduating college, Luckey worked for the Sunrise Company, KK of Japan, as Assistant Branch Manager of the Los Angeles office. There, he co-managed Japanese licensing of various western properties for the Asian market, including The Simpsons, The Adventures of Tintin, and Lone Wolf and Cub, as well as the properties of Mœbius and George Lucas's Lucasfilm. He also managed product placement of Japanese products in American films, most notably the placement of JVC's products in the Back to the Future and Beverly Hills Cop film series.

From 1989 to 1992, Luckey was a producer for the Burbank and Dublin studios of Murakami-Wolf-Swenson, the studio run by Jimmy Murakami and Fred Wolf. He worked on the animated TV series Teenage Mutant Ninja Turtles and Rockin' Through the Decades. From 1992 to 1998, Luckey was involved in the video game industry, including stints as a Director and Executive Producer for Virgin Interactive; President and CEO of Pure Interactive Entertainment; and Principal and Executive Producer-Interactive for the Krislin Company. He was part of the Virgin Interactive team that worked on the video game adaption of Aladdin. After finishing his M.Div in 2001, he served as the interim chief executive and as a corporate director of biometric science company Symaxxis. He held these positions until 2003, when he left to co-found Greater Family, LLC, a family-oriented media company headquartered in Ridgefield, Connecticut. He later joined the Connecticut Wing United States Air Force Auxiliary's Civil Air Patrol, holding the rank of officer.

Luckey is a frequent speaker at industry events, including SIGGRAPH and the Game Developer's Conference. He has co-authored and co-edited two white papers for the International Game Developers Association (IGDA) and is a founding member of the IGDA's committees on Intellectual Property Rights and Quality of Life in the Game Industry. He is a voting member of ASIFA Hollywood, ASIFA International, and the Institute of Electronic and Electrical Engineers (IEEE). He is a professional member of the Association for Computing Machinery (ACM) and of SIGGRAPH, ACM's special interest group on computer graphics and interactive technologies. Luckey was named Computer Graphics Pioneer by SIGGRAPH in 2006/2007.
