= Lists of feature film series =

The lists of feature film series vary by their number of entries including;

== By number of entries ==
- List of feature film series with more than thirty entries
- List of feature film series with 21 to 30 entries
- List of feature film series with 11 to 20 entries
- List of feature film series with ten entries
- List of feature film series with nine entries
- List of feature film series with eight entries
- List of feature film series with seven entries
- List of feature film series with six entries
- List of feature film series with five entries
- List of feature film series with four entries
- List of feature film series with three entries

== By country ==
- List of Indian film series

== By studio ==
- List of 20th Century Studios film series
- List of Columbia Pictures film series
- List of Metro-Goldwyn-Mayer film series
- List of Paramount Pictures film series
- List of TriStar Pictures film series
- List of Universal Pictures film series
- List of Walt Disney Pictures film series
- List of Warner Bros. Pictures film series

== See also ==
- List of highest-grossing films
- List of film serials
- List of short film series
- List of animated short film series
