= Bray Magazine =

Bray Magazine is a theatrical cartoon series consisting of three-minute shorts made by Bray Productions. It lasted from December 16, 1922 to 1923. The series was directed by Milt Gross.

== Filmography ==
=== 1922 ===
- Strap Hangers
- Bobby Bumps at School
- Taxes

=== 1923 ===
- If We Reversed
