= Bobby Bumps =

Series of silent animated short films (1915–1925)

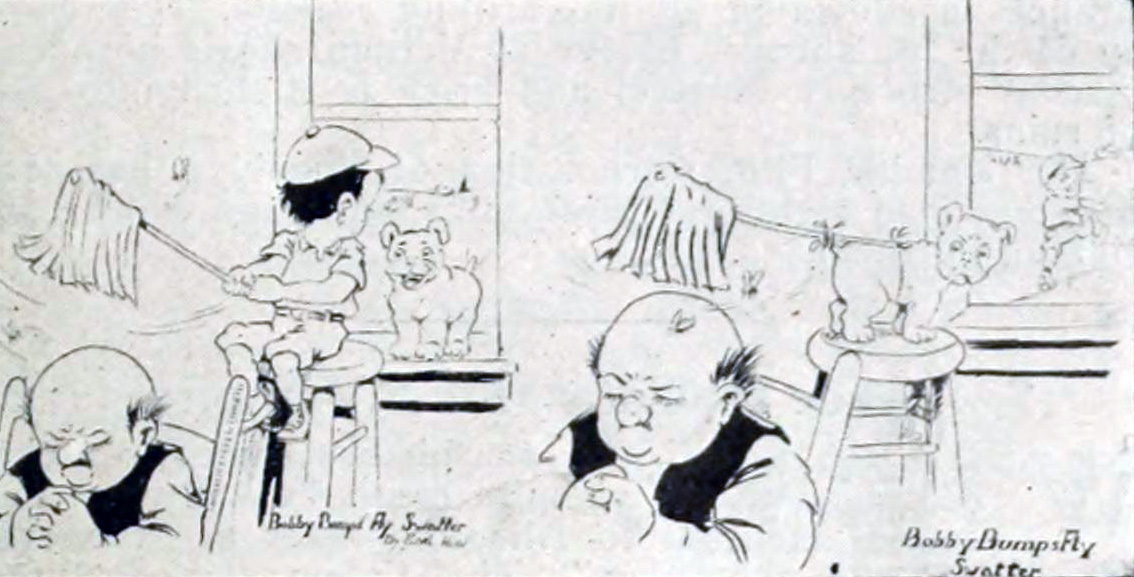
Bobby Bumps Fly Swatter (1916)

Bobby Bumps Chicken Dressing (1923)

Bobby Bumps is the titular character of a series of American silent animated short subjects created by Earl Hurd and produced by Bray Productions from 1915 to 1925. Inspired by R. F. Outcault's comic strip Buster Brown, Bobby Bumps was a little boy who, accompanied by his dog Fido, regularly found himself in and out of mischief. Each cartoon begins with a cartoonist's hand drawing Bobby, Fido and the backgrounds.

The first two cartoons were released in 1915 by Universal; the next few years' titles were released by Paramount Pictures as part of their Paramount Bray Pictograph and, later, Paramount Magazine short-subjects packages. Mid-1920s shorts were released by Educational Pictures.

The Bobby Bumps cartoons were the first to be produced using the cel animation process. Previously, animated cartoons were produced using paper animation: a new drawing was made for each frame of film. With cel animation, Bray drew his characters on clear sheets of celluloid, which he placed over still backgrounds during the photography process. Cel animation revolutionized the animation industry, and Hurd and his employer J.R. Bray held a patent for the process (and received licensing payments from all studios using the process) until 1932. Hurd directed and animated most of the films.

A 1918 short, Bobby Bumps Becomes an Ace, reflects the country's concerns about World War I. In this short, Bobby dreams that he shoots down German fighters and tries to sink a U-boat.

In 2019, a comprehensive Blu-ray/DVD collection from animation researcher/restorer Tommy José Stathes, Cartoon Roots: Bobby Bumps and Fido, was released, containing fifteen shorts and much background material.

== Filmography ==
1915

- Bobby Bumps Gets Pa's Goat
- Bobby Bumps Adventures

1916

- Bobby Bumps and His Pointer Pup - first Bobby Bumps cartoon produced at Bray Productions.

Bobby Bumps Gets a Substitute, 1916

- Bobby Bumps Gets a Substitute
- Bobby Bumps and His Goatmobile
- Bobby Bumps Goes Fishing
- Bobby Bumps' Fly Swatter
- Bobby Bumps and the Detective Story
- Bobby Bumps Loses His Pup
- Bobby Bumps and the Stork
- Bobby Bumps Starts a Lodge
- Bobby Bumps Helps Out a Book Agent
- Bobby Bumps Queers a Choir
- Bobby Bumps at the Circus

1917

- Bobby Bumps in the Great Divide
- Bobby Bumps Adopts a Turtle
- Bobby Bumps, Office Boy
- Bobby Bumps Outwits the Dogcatcher
- Bobby Bumps Volunteers
- Bobby Bumps, Daylight Camper
- Bobby Bumps, Submarine Chaser
- Bobby Bumps' Fourth
- Bobby Bumps' Amusement Park
- Bobby Bumps, Surf Rider
- Bobby Bumps Starts to School
- Bobby Bumps' World "Serious"
- Bobby Bumps, Chef
- Fido's Birthday Party
- Bobby Bumps, Early Shopper
- Bobby Bumps' Tank

1918

- Bobby Bumps' Disappearing Gun
- Bobby Bumps at the Dentist
- Bobby Bumps' Fight
- Bobby Bumps On the Road
- Bobby Bumps Caught in the Jamb
- Bobby Bumps Out West
- Bobby Bumps Films a Fire
- Bobby Bumps Becomes an Ace
- Bobby Bumps on the Doughnut Trail
- Bobby Bumps and the Speckled Death
- Bobby Bumps, Incubator
- Bobby Bumps in Before and After
- Bobby Bumps Puts a Beanery on the Bum

1919

- Bobby Bumps' Last Smoke
- Bobby Bumps' Lucky Day
- Bobby Bumps' Night Out with Some Night Owls
- Bobby Bumps' Pup Gets the Flea-enza
- Bobby Bumps: Eel-ectric Launch
- Bobby Bumps and the Sand Lizard
- Bobby Bumps and the Hypnotic Eye
- Bobby Bumps Throwing the Bull - final Bobby Bumps cartoon produced at Bray Productions.
- Their Master's Voice

1920

- Bobby Bumps' Non-Stop Flight
- The Doughnut Lifter
- Captain Kiddlets
- Oh, What a Knight
- Bobby Bumps, Cave Man
- A Trip to the Moon
- Pot Luck
- Bobby Bumps' Orchestra (sometimes listed as Bobby Bumps, Conductor)

1921

- Pen and Inklings
- Mixed Drinks
- Checkmated
- Bobby Bumps Joins the Band
- Bobby Bumps Working on an Idea
- Shadow Boxing
- Hunting and Fishing

1922

- One Ol' Cat
- Railroading
- Bobby Bumps at School
- Fresh Fish (includes a live-action Bobby)

1923

- The Movie Daredevil
- Their Love Grew Cold
- Chicken Dressing

1925

- Bobby Bumps and Company
