= Colonel Heeza Liar =

Series of animated films produced by J. R. Bray Studios

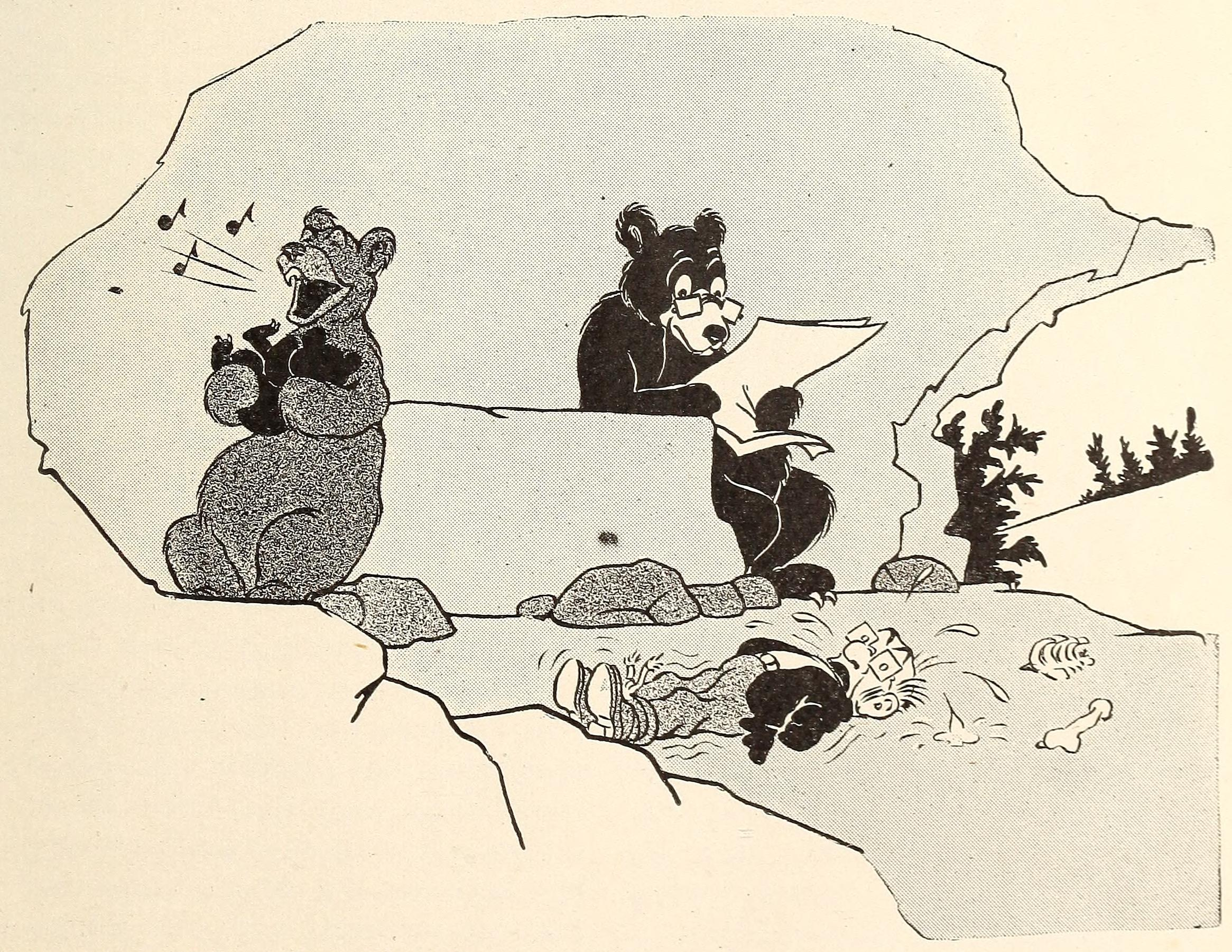
Colonel Heeza Liar's Waterloo (1916)

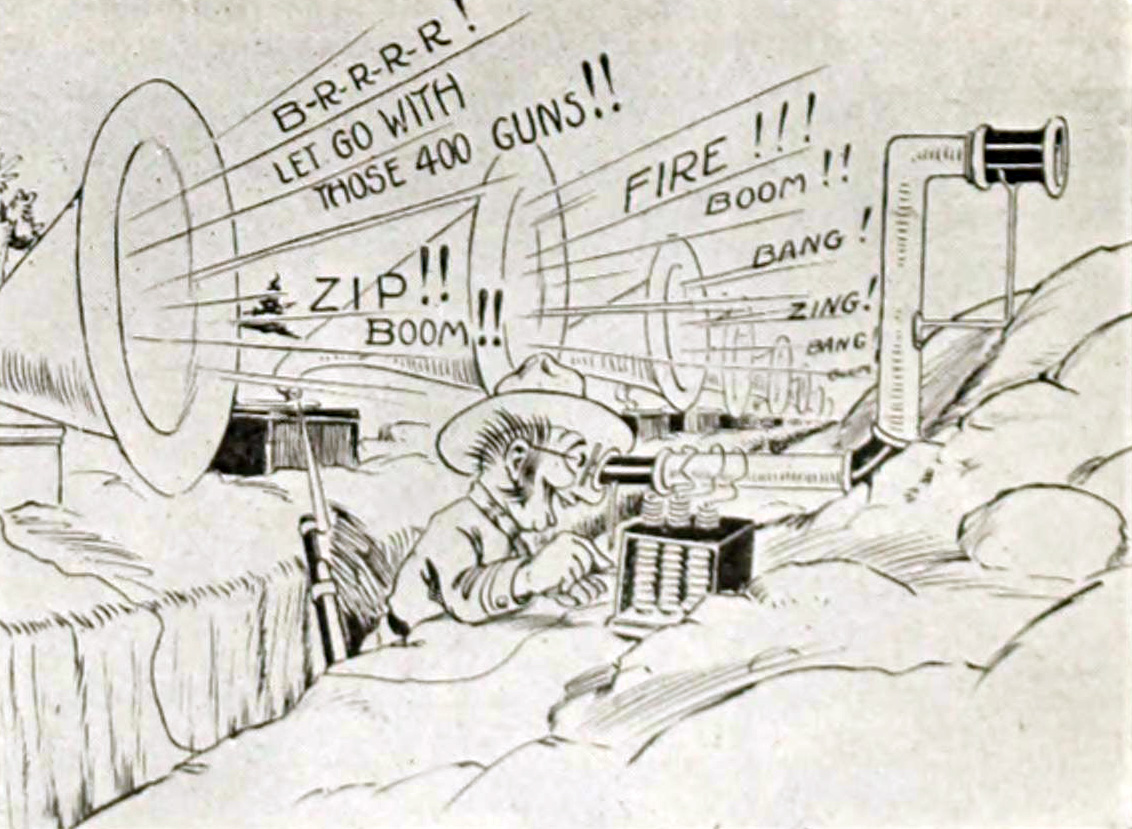
Colonel Heeza Liar and the Bandits (1916)

Colonel Heeza Liar at the Bat (1915)

Colonel Heeza Liar On the Jump (1917)

Colonel Heeza Liar is the star of the second animated series featuring a recurring character and the first featuring a recurring character created specifically for an animated film. Sidney Smith's Old Doc Yak appeared in 3 lost films in 1913 before Colonel Heeza Liar appeared. Smith's series though was based on his Old Doc Yak comic strip. Smith did 13 additional cartoons in 1914 and 2 in 1915. Colonel Heeza Liar was created by the American animator J. R. Bray and is mainly based on Theodore Roosevelt and the general stereotype of the 19th and early 20th century former adventurer and lion hunter. The series ran from 1913 to 1917 and restarted in 1922 until 1924. It was produced by Bray Productions and directed by Vernon Stallings. The series was animated by Walter Lantz from 1922 to 1924 and featured live-action segments interacting with the animation, much like the popular contemporary series Out of the Inkwell.

== Filmography ==
#	Title	Release date
1	Colonel Heeza Liar in Africa	November 23, 1913
2	Colonel Heeza Liar's African Hunt	January 10, 1914
3	Colonel Heeza Liar Shipwrecked	March 14, 1914
4	Colonel Heeza Liar in Mexico	April 18, 1914
5	Colonel Heeza Liar, Farmer	May 18, 1914
6	Colonel Heeza Liar, Explorer	August 15, 1914
7	Colonel Heeza Liar in the Wilderness	September 26, 1914
8	Colonel Heeza Liar, Naturalist	October 24, 1914
9	Colonel Heeza Liar, Ghost Breaker	February 6, 1915
10	Colonel Heeza Liar in the Haunted Castle	February 20, 1915
11	Colonel Heeza Liar Runs the Blockade	March 20, 1915
12	Colonel Heeza Liar and the Torpedo	April 3, 1915
13	Colonel Heeza Liar and the Zeppelin	April 10, 1915
14	Colonel Heeza Liar Signs the Pledge	May 8, 1915
15	Colonel Heeza Liar in the Trenches	May 13, 1915
16	Colonel Heeza Liar at the Front	May 16, 1915
17	Colonel Heeza Liar, Aviator	May 22, 1915
18	Colonel Heeza Liar Invents a New Kind of Shell	June 5, 1915
19	Colonel Heeza Liar, Dog Fancier	July 10, 1915
20	Colonel Heeza Liar Foils the Enemy	July 31, 1915
21	Colonel Heeza Liar, War Dog	August 21, 1915
22	Colonel Heeza Liar at the Bat	September 4, 1915
23	Colonel Heeza Liar, Nature Faker	December 28, 1915
24	Colonel Heeza Liar's Waterloo	January 6, 1916
25	Colonel Heeza Liar and the Pirates	March 5, 1916
26	Colonel Heeza Liar Wins the Pennant	April 27, 1916
27	Colonel Heeza Liar Captures Villa	May 25, 1916
28	Colonel Heeza Liar and the Bandits	June 22, 1916
29	Colonel Heeza Liar's Courtship	July 20, 1916
30	Colonel Heeza Liar on Strike	August 17, 1916
31	Colonel Heeza Liar Plays Hamlet	August 24, 1916
32	Colonel Heeza Liar Bachelor Quarters	September 14, 1916
33	Colonel Heeza Liar Gets Married	October 11, 1916
34	Colonel Heeza Liar, Hobo	November 15, 1916
35	Colonel Heeza Liar at the Vaudeville Show	December 21, 1916
36	Colonel Heeza Liar on the Jump	February 4, 1917
37	Colonel Heeza Liar, Spy Dodger	March 19, 1917
38	Colonel Heeza Liar's Temperance Lecture	August 20, 1917
39	Colonel Heeza Liar's Treasure Island	December 17, 1922
40	Colonel Heeza Liar and the Ghost	January 14, 1923
41	Colonel Heeza Liar, Detective	February 1, 1923
42	Colonel Heeza Liar's Burglar	March 11, 1923
43	Colonel Heeza Liar in the African Jungles	June 3, 1923
44	Colonel Heeza Liar in Uncle Tom's Cabin	July 8, 1923
45	Colonel Heeza Liar's Vacation	August 5, 1923
46	Colonel Heeza Liar's Forbidden Fruit	November 1, 1923
47	Colonel Heeza Liar, Strikebreaker	December 1, 1923
48	Colonel Heeza Liar's Mysterious Case	February 1, 1924
49	Colonel Heeza Liar's Ancestor	March 1, 1924
50	Colonel Heeza Liar's Knighthood	April 1, 1924
51	Colonel Heeza Liar, Sky Pilot	May 1, 1924
52	Colonel Heeza Liar, Daredevil	June 1, 1924
53	Colonel Heeza Liar's Horseplay	July 1, 1924
54	Colonel Heeza Liar, Cave Man	August 1, 1924
55	Colonel Heeza Liar, Bull Thrower	September 1, 1924
56	Colonel Heeza Liar the Lyin' Tamer	October 1, 1924
57	Colonel Heeza Liar's Romance	November 1, 1924
58	Colonel Heeza Liar, Nature Faker	December 1, 1924

== Reception ==
Considering the first film, Colonel Heeza Liar in Africa, Leonard Maltin writes, "Technically, the film is adequate. Bray is true to perspective and proportions; when the character runs in circles, his drawings remain consistent and accurate. Movement is not smooth, but it's more than adequate to put over the simple story and gags."
