= Vernon Stallings =

American animation director and writer

George Vernon Stallings (September 9, 1891 – April 9, 1963) was an American animation director and writer. He started working for Bray Productions in 1916 where he directed the Colonel Heeza Liar series of shorts, and the Krazy Kat shorts.

He invented "the animation disk placed in the centre of the drawing board" in the 1920s. Its primary use by 1930 was as an aid in inking cels. He then worked for Van Beuren Studios from 1931 through 1934.

In 1938, Stallings directed the Silly Symphonies short Merbabies, and worked in story development for the Disney studios on the feature films Fantasia (1940), Dumbo (1941), Bambi (1942) and Song of the South (1946).

He wrote the Uncle Remus and His Tales of Br'er Rabbit comic strip from 1946 to 1963.

He was the son of famous baseball manager George Stallings.
