= Dinky Doodle =

Cartoon character

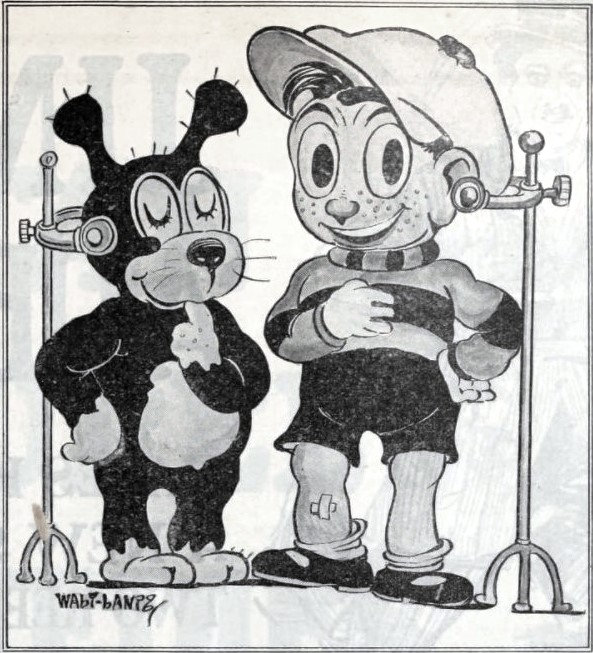
- from a 1924 publication
- First appearance: Dinky Doodle and the Magic Lamp (1924)
- Last appearance: Dinky Doodle in the Army (1926)
- Created by: Walter Lantz

In-universe information
- Species: Human
- Gender: Male
- Family: Weakheart (pet dog)

Dinky Doodle was a cartoon character created by Walter Lantz for Bray Productions in 1924. It was also distributed through the Standard Cinema Corporation (SCC).

== Description ==
Dinky was a standard boy character, sporting a flat cap, a striped shirt, and dark shorts. He and his dog Weakheart appeared alongside Lantz himself (as the cartoonist) in a series of cartoons that combined live-action and animation, similar in style to Max Fleischer's Out of the Inkwell series. Walter Lantz not only acted in this series, but also wrote and directed it. The character of Weakheart, Dinky's black and white pet dog, was based on the 1920s canine film star Strongheart. The series was originally silent. In the early sound era, Bray reissued some with synchronized sound and music but little true speech; some scenes simply employed a gibberish sound when someone talked, or added basic sound effects for objects and animals. Many episodes were parodies of fairy tales such as the Pied Piper or Jack and the Beanstalk; the first episode was a parody of Aladdin and the Wonderful Lamp.

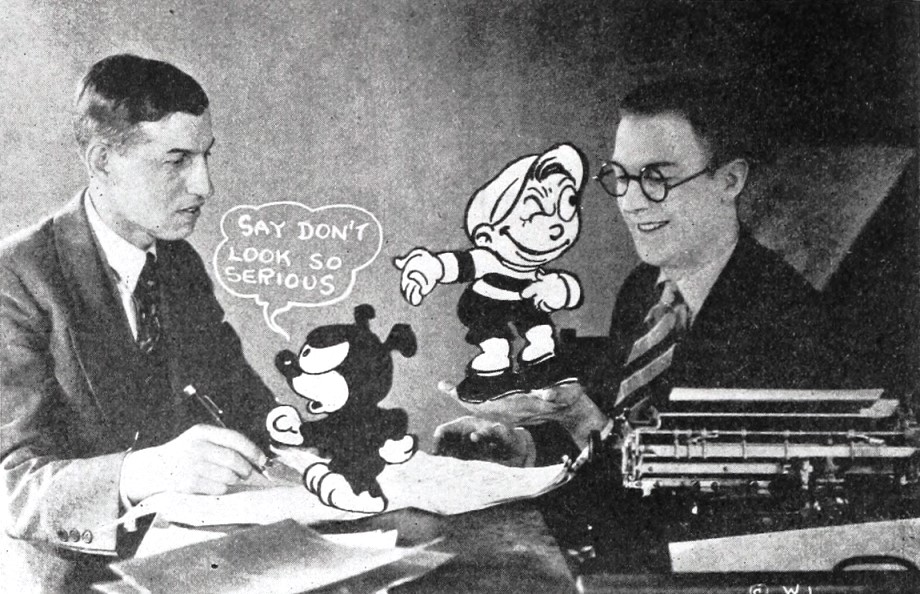
Dinky Doodle and Walter Lantz (right) in 1925

The character enjoyed a degree of popularity among audiences. Contemporaneous reviews stated that Dinky Doodle had become a famous figure in the cinema world and was loved by millions, but was retired from the screen in 1926 after Lantz left Bray for Winkler Pictures.

== Plot format ==
An average short was about eight minutes long and consisted of Dinky and Weakheart hanging out with Walter Lantz in his apartment. A problem would come, and Lantz got Dinky and Weakheart to deal with it. The story had them go on a wacky, fun adventure that caused a bigger problem in the end, mainly for Lantz. For example, they might lead a giant into Lantz's apartment and have it fight him, or lead a group of mice away, only for them to return and tackle Lantz.

== Dinky Doodle Shorts (Incomplete) ==
All films were directed and written by Lantz.

No.	Title	Release Date
1	Dinky Doodle and the Magic Lamp	Sept. 15, 1924
2	Dinky Doodle the Giant Killer	Oct. 15, 1924
3	Dinky Doodle the Pied Piper	Dec. 1, 1924
4	Red Riding Hood	Jan. 4, 1925
5	The Captain's Kid	Feb. 1, 1925
6	Dinky Doodle & Cinderella	Mar. 1, 1925
7	The House That Dinky Built	Mar. 29, 1925
8	Peter Pan Handled	Apr. 26, 1925
9	The Magic Carpet	May 24, 1924
10	Robinson Crusoe	June 21, 1925
11	Three Bears	July 19, 1925
12	Babes in the Woods	Aug. 16, 1925
13	Just Spooks	Sept. 13, 1925
14	Dinky Doodle and the Bad Man	September 20, 1925
15	Dinky Doodle in the Hunt	November 1, 1925
16	Dinky Doodle in the Circus	November 29, 1925
17	Dinky Doodle at the Restaurant	December 27, 1925
18	Dinky Doodle at the Studio	Jan. 24, 1926
19	Dinky Doodle in Lost and Found	February 19, 1926
20	Dinky Doodle in Uncle Tom's Cabin	February 21, 1926
21	Dinky Doodle and the Arctic	March 21, 1926
22	Dinky Doodle in Egypt	April 8, 1926
23	Dinky Doodle in the Wild West	May 16, 1926
24	Dinky Doodle's Bedtime Story	June 12, 1926
25	Dinky Doodle and the Little Orphan	July 4, 1926
26	Dinky Doodle and the Magician	Aug. 1, 1926
27	Dinky Doodle in the Army	August 15, 1926

== In popular culture ==
The character was mentioned as someone supposedly kidnapped when Angelo mocks Eddie Valiant for working for a toon in the 1988 film Who Framed Roger Rabbit.
