= Bray Studios =

Defunct American animation studio

Bray Productions
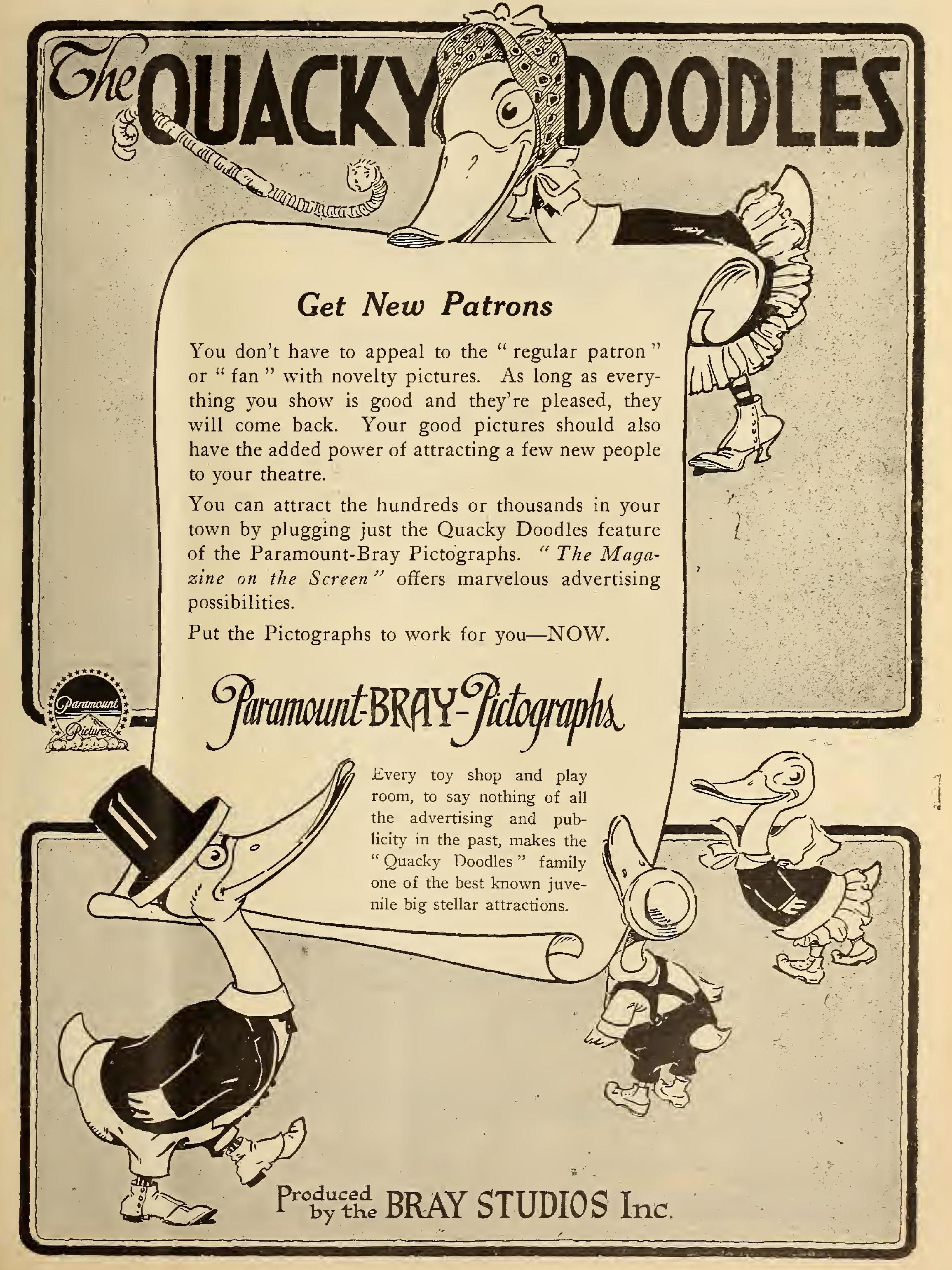
- Type: Animation
- Industry: Motion pictures
- Predecessor: Emile Cohl Pictures
- Founded: 1912; 114 years ago
- Founder: John Randolph Bray
- Defunct: 1928; 98 years ago
- Fate: Bankruptcy
- Successor: Walter Lantz Productions; Out of the Inkwell Studios; Fleischer Studios; Library: Skydance Corporation (through Melange Pictures, Turner Entertainment Co., and DC Entertainment)
- Headquarters: New York City, New York, United States
- Key people: John Randolph Bray; Earl Hurd; Paul Terry; Max Fleischer; Dave Fleischer; Walter Lantz
- Owner: John Randolph Bray

Bray Studios also known as Bray Productions was a pioneering American animation studio that produced several popular cartoons before and during the years of World War I and the early interwar era, becoming a springboard for several key animators of the 20th century, including the Fleischer brothers, Walter Lantz, Paul Terry, Shamus Culhane and Grim Natwick among others.

== History ==
The studio was founded sometime before 1912 by John Randolph Bray. It was perhaps one of the first studios entirely devoted to serial animation at the time instead of one-off experiments. Its first series was Bray's Colonel Heeza Liar, but from the beginning, the studio brought in outsiders to direct promising new series. Carl Anderson, later known for the comic strip Henry, directed The Police Dog from the beginning of the company.

The year 1915 brought Earl Hurd and Paul Terry; the former became J. R. Bray's business partner and directed Bobby Bumps, the latter was employed under duress and directed Farmer Al Falfa. The brothers Max and Dave Fleischer joined in 1916. In 1918, the rival International Film Service studio folded and owner William Randolph Hearst licensed Bray to continue the IFS series, which included Jerry on the Job films adapted from Walter Hoban's comic strip. Many staff members of the former studio transferred to Bray, and most of the new cartoons were directed by the same man who directed them for IFS, Gregory La Cava.

Bray's goal was to have four units working on four cartoons at any one time; since it took a month to complete a film, four units with staggered schedules produced one cartoon a week for use of the "screen magazines" (a one-reel collection of live-action didactic pieces and travelogs in addition to the cartoon, that was played before the feature). Bray started with Pathé as his distributor, switched to Paramount in 1916, and then switched to Goldwyn Pictures in 1919.

Of the units, one produced his Colonel Heeza Liar, one produced Hurd's Bobby Bumps, and one produced non-series cartoons, usually topical commentaries on the news directed by Leighton Budd, J. D. Leventhal, and others. The fourth unit was the one that kept changing hands. It produced Terry's Farmer Al Falfa in 1916, until Terry left a year later, and the Farmer went with him. It then produced Max Fleischer's Out of the Inkwell until 1921, when Fleischer left, taking Koko the Clown with him. The influx of IFS series at the same time broke up the four-unit system — in 1920 there were ten series going simultaneously, with Heeza Liar in hiatus from 1917.

Bray was constantly looking to expand his studio. He financed the semi-independent studio of C. Allen Gilbert to create a series of serious Silhouette Fantasies on classical themes (he actually did some of the animation work for this series). In 1917 he bought out his distributor's screen magazine to produce one of his own, moving him into the realm of live-action shorts producer. During World War I, he assigned Leventhal and Max Fleischer's units to create training and educational cartoons for the U.S. Army. These did so well that after the war, Bray was swamped with orders from the government and big business to make films for them.

Over a period of years, Bray moved the focus of his company from entertainment to education, putting Leventhal and E. Dean Parmelee in charge of the technical department. Dr. Rowland Rogers became educational director, while Jamison "Jam" Handy was put in charge of a Chicago–Detroit branch for creating films for the auto industry, Bray's largest private client.

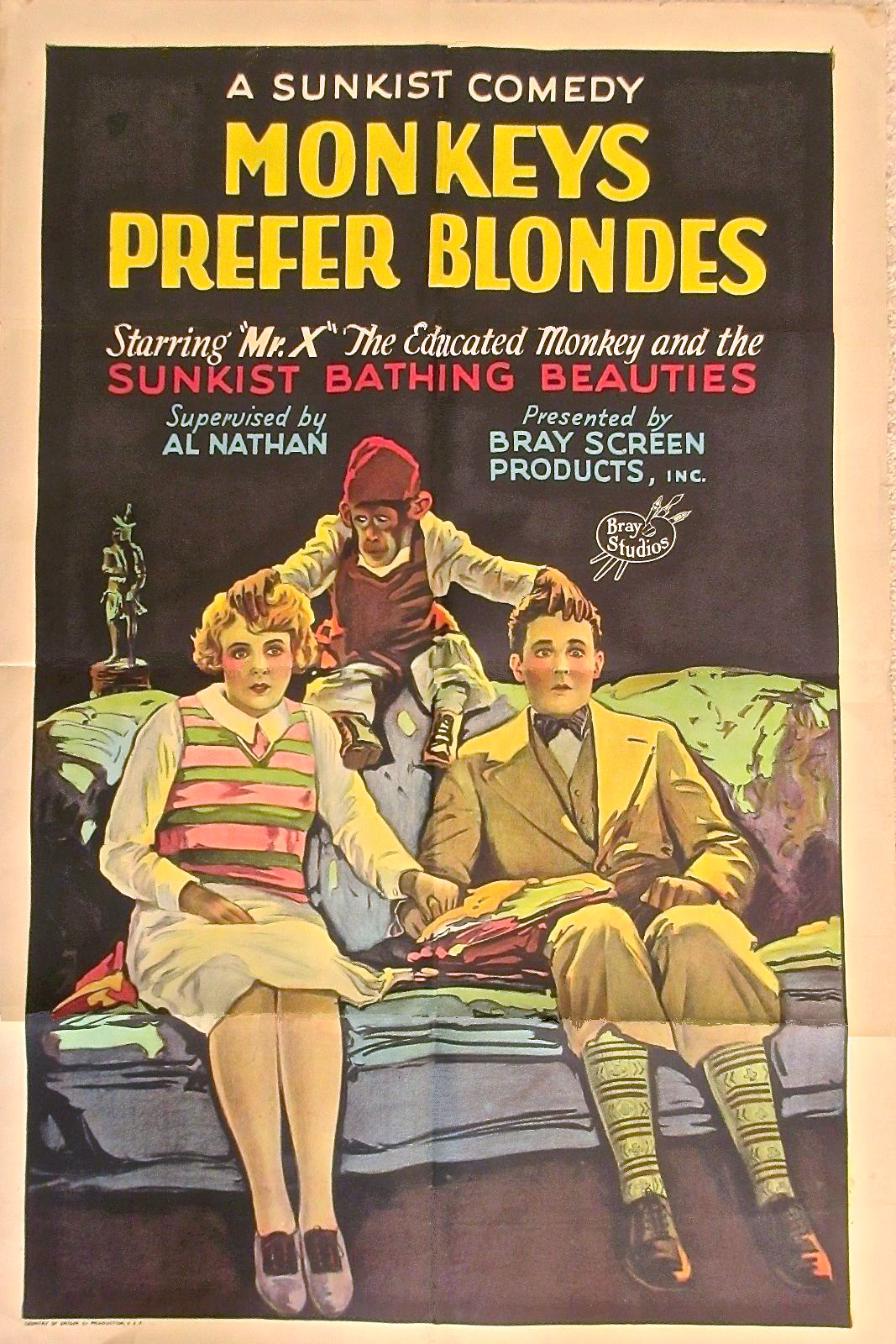
Poster for a 1926 Bray Studios film short, Monkeys Prefer Blondes

The 1919 move from Paramount to Goldwyn also included a re-incorporation of the studio, now called Bray Pictures Corporation. The studio was putting out more than three reels of screen magazines per week, as well as educational and training films. Bray Pictures also made the first cartoon made in color, The Debut of Thomas Cat, shot in Brewster Color and released on February 8, 1920 (although some claim the first animated short was the British In Gollywog Land, a stop motion/live-action hybrid shot in Kinemacolor and made in 1912 or the animation/live-action hybrid Pinto's Prizma Comedy Revue made by Pinto Colvig in 1919 and shot in the Prizma process) and was apparently involved in an unnamed sound-on-film cartoon by Walt Lantz (co-producer/director) and Hugo Riesenfeld (composer) in 1927 for Movietone, in between the releases of Don Juan and The Jazz Singer and coincidentally shortly before Bray Pictures' demise.

The expenses quickly outweighed the revenue, and in January 1920, Samuel Goldwyn bought a controlling interest in Bray Pictures and ordered a massive reorganization. Max Fleischer and J. D. Leventhal became supervising directors of the entertainment and technical branches of the studio respectively, and the company was streamlined to work more like Goldwyn Picture Corporation, with two cartoons released a week, which meant a much bigger workload than most were willing to take.

The result was a massive exodus of talent, including Max Fleischer and even Earl Hurd, which also led to an increasingly poor output which led Goldwyn to drop Bray Pictures. In the wake of this setback, Vernon Stallings took over as Bray's entertainment production supervisor, being replaced by Walter Lantz by 1924. Stallings directed Krazy Kat and the revival of Heeza Liar, while Lantz directed Dinky Doodle. Among the big names who passed through the studio were Wallace Carlson, Milt Gross, Frank Moser, Burt Gillett, Grim Natwick, Raoul Barré, Pat Sullivan, Jack King, David Hand, Clyde Geronimi and Shamus Culhane.

J.R. Bray paid little attention to the animation side of things during the 1920s, focusing instead on beating Hal Roach as the king of two-reel comedy, with the disastrous series "The McDougall Alley Kids". When this adventure failed, he slipped out of the business. Meanwhile, Walter Lantz practically became a full-fledged producer as head of the cartoon division, with some trade publications referring to the studio as "Lantz-Bray" by the time the entertainment branch of Bray Pictures Corporation closed in 1928. The educational/commercial branch, Brayco, made mostly filmstrips from the 1920s until it closed in 1963. The Jam Handy Organization began life as a subsidiary of Bray Studios to fulfill its business contracts, making several thousand industrial and sponsored films and tens of thousands of filmstrips, mostly for the automobile industry, as an independent entity from 1928 until 1983. Max Fleischer, after being ousted from his own studio in the early 1940s, worked for Handy and later on Brayco in the 1940s and 1950s.

== Filmography ==
- Colonel Heeza Liar (1913–1917, 1922–1924): directed by J. R. Bray 1913–1917; Vernon Stallings 1922–1924
- The Police Dog (1914–1916, 1918): directed by C. T. Anderson
- The Trick Kids (1916): directed by Alexander Leggett
- Plastiques (1916): directed by Ashley Miller
- Bobby Bumps (1916–1922): directed by Earl Hurd
- Farmer Al Falfa (1916–1917): directed by Paul Terry
- Silhouette Fantasies (1916): directed by C. Allen Gilbert
- Miss Nanny Goat (1916–1917): directed by Clarence Rigby
- Quacky Doodles (1917): directed by F.M. Follett
- Picto Puzzles (1917): Sam Lloyd
- Otto Luck (1917): directed by Wallace A. Carlson
- Goodrich Dirt (1917–1919): directed by Wallace A. Carlson
- Out of the Inkwell (1918–1921): directed by Max Fleischer and Dave Fleischer
- Hardrock Dome (1919): directed by Pat Sullivan
- Us Fellers (1919–1920): directed by Wallace A. Carlson
- Jerry on the Job (1919–1922): directed by Gregory La Cava, Vernon Stallings, (Inherited from International Film Service)
- Lampoons (1920): directed by Burt Gillett
- Ginger Snaps (1920): directed by Milt Gross
- Shenanigan Kids (1920): directed by Gregory La Cava, Burt Gillett, and Grim Natwick (Inherited from International Film Service)
- Krazy Kat (1920–1921): directed by Vernon Stallings (Inherited from International Film Service)
- Happy Hooligan (1920–1921): directed by Gregory La Cava, Bill Nolan (Inherited from International Film Service)
- Judge Rummy (1920–21): directed by Gregory La Cava, Burt Gillett, Grim Natwick and Jack King (Inherited from International Film Service)
- Technical Romances (1922–1923): directed by J.A. Norling, Ashley Miller, and F. Lyle Goldman
- Ink Ravings (1922–1923): directed by Milt Gross
- Bray Magazine (1922–1923): directed by Milt Gross
- Dinky Doodle (1924–1926): directed by Walter Lantz
- Un-Natural History (1925–1927): directed by Walter Lantz and Clyde Geronimi
- Hot Dog Cartoons (1926–1927): directed by Walter Lantz and Clyde Geronimi
- A McDougall Alley Comedy (1926–1928): directed by Joe Rock, Stan DeLay and Robert Wilcox
