= Earl Hurd =

American animator and director (1880–1940)

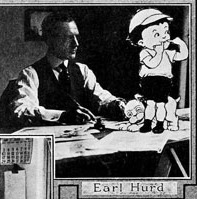
- Hurd in 1917, with Bobby Bumps superimposed
- Born: September 14, 1880; Kansas City, Missouri, U.S.
- Died: September 28, 1940 (aged 60); Burbank, California, U.S.
- Occupation(s): Animator, film director, comic strip cartoonist
- Years active: 1911–1940
- Relatives: Andy Luckey (cousin twice removed)

Earl Hurd (September 14, 1880 – September 28, 1940) was a pioneering American animator and film director. He is noted for creating and producing the silent Bobby Bumps animated short subject series for early animation producer J.R. Bray's Bray Productions. Hurd and Bray are jointly responsible for developing the processes involved in cel animation, and were granted patents for their processes in 1914.

Animator Andy Luckey is a maternal cousin, twice removed, of Hurd's.

== Career ==
Hurd, a native of Kansas City, Missouri, was a cartoonist for The Chicago Journal and The New York Herald. He then later worked for Bray Productions. Inspired by the cartoon character Buster Brown, Hurd invented the cartoon character Bobby Bumps, and his series of cartoons lasted from 1915 to 1925. The series is notable for the first example of a character appearing "out of the inkwell", years before the Fleischer Brothers. He and Bray developed and patented cel animation in 1914, which eliminated needs to redraw the background. They made a profit off of it with the Bray-Hurd Processing Co. until 1932, when the patent went into the public domain. After Bray, he worked for The Van Beuren Corporation, before ultimately making his own studio, making animations from 1922 to 1925.

He worked later at the Iwerks studio and the Walt Disney studio as a storyboard artist. Animation historian Giannalberto Bendazzi has called Hurd "probably the best American animator of his time" after Bray and said of his films that they "display an uncommon visual inventiveness, gentle humour and attention to drawing and scenography".

Hurd died on September 28, 1940, in his home in Burbank, California.

== Gallery ==
Bobby Bumps Starts a Lodge (1916)

Bobby Bumps and the Stork (1916)

Bobby Bumps Starts For School (1917)

Bobby Bumps' Fourth (1917)

Bobby Bumps puts a Beanery on the Bum (1918)

Bobby Bumps in Their Master's Voice (1921)
