= Out of the Inkwell =

1918-1929 American animated film series

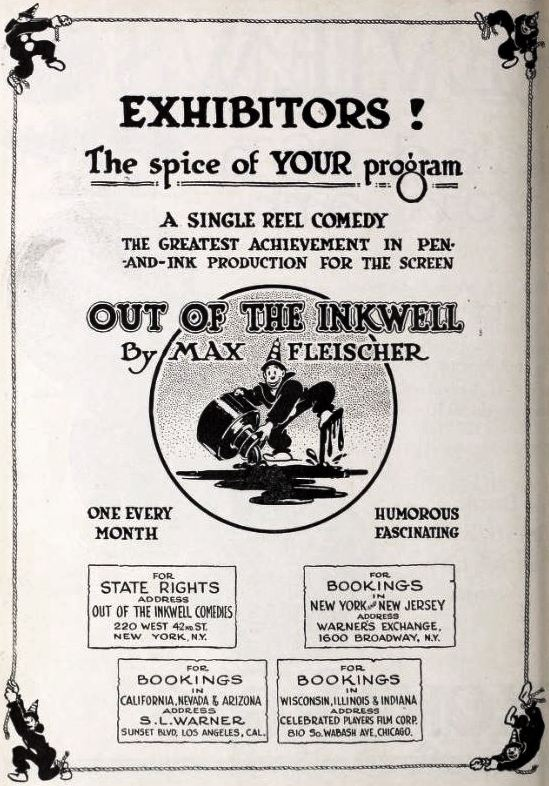
- Advertisement
- Directed by: Max Fleischer; Dave Fleischer
- Written by: Max Fleischer
- Produced by: Max Fleischer; J.R. Bray
- Production companies: Bray Pictures; Inkwell Studios
- Distributed by: Various; Winkler Pictures; Red Seal Pictures; Paramount Pictures
- Country: United States
- Language: Silent film

Rotoscoped sequence of Koko the Clown from the 1919 film The Tantalizing Fly: length 45 seconds, 410 kbit/s overall. Link to full size 480×320 pixels. Link to complete film.

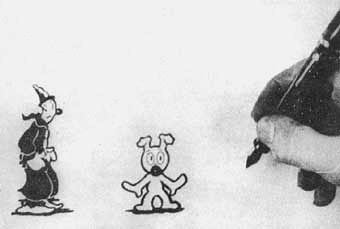
Still from an Inkwell Imps cartoon featuring Koko the Clown and Fitz the Dog.

The National Film Registry-preserved short Koko's Earth Control, featuring Koko the Clown and Fitz the Dog.

Out of the Inkwell is an American animated film series of the silent era created by Max Fleischer, which pioneered the use of several animation techniques during its run. The shorts were a mix between live-action and animation, with cartoon character Koko the Clown (initially known as "The Inkwell Clown" or simply "The Clown") interacting with the people around him, most notably Fleischer himself (referred to as "The Boss").

The series was first produced at Bray Pictures between 1918 and 1921, when Max and Dave Fleischer founded Inkwell Studios, releasing the series through various state-rights companies (including what would become Screen Gems) until 1924 when the Fleischers joined Red Seal Pictures. After Red Seal folded in 1927, Paramount Pictures picked up the series and renamed it The Inkwell Imps, which ran until 1929.

== History ==
The series was the result of three short experimental films that Max Fleischer independently produced from 1914 to 1916 to demonstrate his invention, the rotoscope, a device consisting of a film projector and easel used to achieve realistic movement for animated cartoons. The rotoscope projected motion picture film through an opening in the easel, covered by a glass pane serving as a drawing surface. The image on the projected film was traced onto paper, advancing the film one frame at a time as each drawing was made. Fleischer's younger brother Dave Fleischer, who was working as a clown at Coney Island, served as the model for their first famous character, eventually known as Koko the Clown, who in each cartoon popped out of the inkwell into the "real world".

The earlier shorts followed a rather simple formula: Fleischer would draw the clown who, driven by curiosity, ended up getting himself and the "Boss" as well into trouble. However, the arrival of animator Dick Huemer in mid-to-late 1922 triggered a number of important changes, beginning with the clown being redesigned to look more appealing and easier to animate, which not only helped reduce Fleischer's dependency on the Rotoscope for fluid animation, but also allowed for more complex and outlandish premises as well as giving the cartoons a newspaper comic-like look. Huemer also christened the still-unnamed clown as "Ko-Ko" in 1925 and, influenced by his work on the Mutt and Jeff cartoons (where he began his career in 1916), created a small canine companion named Fitz, who would become Ko-Ko's none-too-bright stooge and later evolved into Bimbo in the sound era. Nevertheless, the interaction of the live-action sequences with the artist/creator, Max Fleischer, and his pen and ink creations remained the foundation of the series.

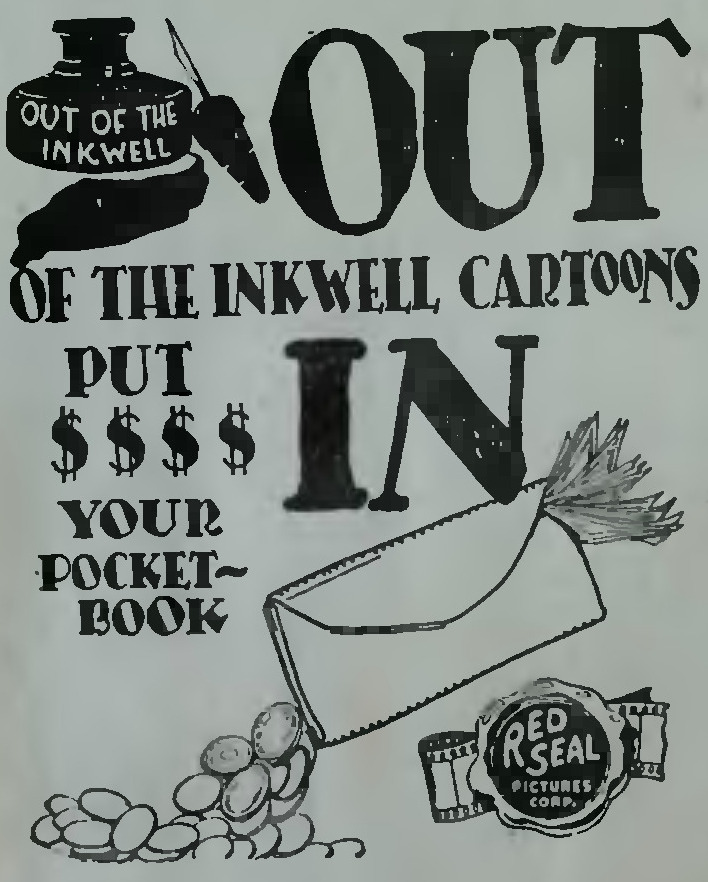
Advertisement to theater owners in The Film Daily, 1926.

The Out of the Inkwell series ran from 1919 to mid 1927, and was renamed The Inkwell Imps for Paramount, continuing until 1929. In all, 87 Out of the Inkwell and 52 Inkwell Imps films were produced in eleven years.

In late 1928, the Fleischers fell out with business partner Alfred Weiss and left Inkwell Pictures to establish a new studio. As a result, Weiss retained the Ko-Ko character, while the Inkwell Imps series continued under another staff until July 1929, when Paramount replaced it with Fleischer's Talkartoons, which became more successful alongside protagonist Bimbo, Fleischer's replacement of Koko. Weiss would re-issue a handful of 1921–26 Out of the Inkwell shorts with sound beginning in the fall of 1929.

Fleischer regained rights to Koko the Clown in 1931, adding him to the Talkartoons series as a supporting character to Bimbo and Betty Boop, but never gained significant popularity. Koko's last Fleischer theatrical appearance was in the Betty Boop cartoon Ha! Ha! Ha! (1934), a fully-animated remake of the silent Inkwell film The Cure (1924). Years later, Koko had a brief cameo in the Famous Studio-produced Screen Song entry Toys will be Toys (1949), his only theatrical appearance in color.

In 1950, Stuart Productions released a number of the Inkwell Studios Out of the Inkwell cartoons, and a selection of the Paramount Inkwell Imps cartoons to television. In 1955, the Inkwell Imps, along with 2,500 pre-October 1950 Paramount shorts and cartoons were sold to television packagers, the majority acquired by U.M. & M. TV Corporation.

In 1958, Max Fleischer revived his studio in a partnership with Hal Seeger, and in 1960 produced a series of one hundred Out Of The Inkwell five-minute cartoons. In the new color series, Koko had a clown girlfriend named Kokette, a pal named Kokonut, and a villain named Mean Moe. Larry Storch provided the voice for Koko and all of the supporting characters.

As of 2025, all of the shorts in the series are now in the public domain. One short in the series, 1922's The Hypnotist, was preserved by the Academy Film Archive in 2010. In 2024, the short Koko's Earth Control was selected for preservation in the United States National Film Registry by the Library of Congress as being "culturally, historically, or aesthetically significant".

== Filmography ==
The following is an attempt to list the complete filmography of the Out of the Inkwell/Inkwell Imps shorts, assembled from the best surviving documentation.

=== The Bray Studio Years (1918–1921) ===
- Experiment No. 1 (10 June 1918) (lost)
- Experiment No. 2 (5 March 1919) (lost)
- Experiment No. 3 (2 April 1919) (lost)
- The Clown's Pup (30 August 1919)
- The Tantalizing Fly (4 October 1919)
- The Boxing Kangaroo (2 February 1920)
- The Chinaman (19 March 1920)
- Slides (12 April 1920) (lost)
- The Circus (6 May 1920)
- The Ouija Board (4 July 1920)
- The Clown's Little Brother (6 July 1920)
- Poker (aka The Card Game) (2 October 1920) (lost)
- Perpetual Motion (2 October 1920)
- The Restaurant (6 November 1920)
- Cartoonland (2 February 1921) (lost)
- The Automobile Ride (20 June 1921)

=== Inkwell Studio: Out of The Inkwell years 1921–1927 ===
The Mechanical Doll (1922)

=== States Rights Distribution 1921-1923 ===
- Modeling (1 October 1921)
- November (1 November 1921)
- Fishing (21 November 1921)
- Invisible Ink (3 December 1921)
- The Fish (7 January 1922)
- The Dresden Doll (aka. The Mechanical Doll) (7 February 1922)
- The Mosquito (6 March 1922) (lost)
- Bubbles (20 April 1922)
- Flies (1 May 1922)
- Pay Day (8 July 1922)
- The Hypnotist (26 July 1922) (partially survives as a 3-minute excerpt)
- The Challenge (29 August 1922)
- The Show (21 September 1922)
- The Reunion (27 October 1922)
- The Birthday (4 November 1922)
- Jumping Beans (15 December 1922)
- Surprise (15 March 1923)
- The Puzzle (15 April 1923)
- Trapped (15 May 1923)
- The Battle (1 July 1923)
- False Alarm (1 August 1923)
- Balloons (aka. Koko's Balloons) (1 September 1923)
- The Fortune Teller (1 October 1923)
- Shadows (1 November 1923) (Lost)
- The Contest (1 December 1923)
- Bed Time (12 December 1923)

=== Red Seal Pictures 1924-1927 ===
- Masquerade (1 February 1924)
- The Cartoon Factory (21 February 1924)
- Mother Gooseland (21 March 1924)
- Trip To Mars (aka. The First Man on the Moon) (1 April 1924)
- A Stitch in Time (aka. Koko Needles the Boss) (1 May 1924)
- Clay Town (28 May 1924)
- The Runaway (25 June 1924)
- Vacation (23 July 1924)
- Vaudeville (aka Koko's Showtime) (20 August 1924)
- League of Nations (17 September 1924)
- Sparring Partners (1 October 1924)
- The Cure (13 December 1924)
- The Storm (aka. Koko's Storm) (20 December 1924)
- The Laundry (30 December 1924) (Lost)
- Thaddeeus and Arlene (2 January 1925)
- Ko-Ko's Lunch on a Cart (20 January 1925)
- Ko-Ko the Barber (25 February 1925)
- Big Chief Ko-Ko (2 March 1925)
- Ko-Ko Trains 'Em (aka. Koko's Pup Talent) (9 May 1925)
- Ko-Ko Sees Spooks (aka. Koko Haunted Hat) (13 June 1925)
- Ko-Ko Celebrates the Fourth (4 July 1925)
- Nutcracker Suite (1 September 1925)
- Ko-Ko Nuts (15 September 1925)
- Ko-Ko on the Run (26 September 1925)
- Ko-Ko Packs 'Em (17 October 1925)
- Ko-Ko Eats (15 November 1925) (Lost)
- Ko-Ko Steps Out (21 November 1925) (Lost)
- Ko-Ko's Thanksgiving (21 November 1925)
- Ko-Ko in Toyland (12 December 1925)
- Ko-Ko the Hot Shot (30 December 1925)
- Ko-Ko's Paradise (aka. Heavenly Daze) (27 February 1926)
- Ko-Ko Baffles the Bulls (6 March 1926)
- It's the Cat's (1 May 1926)
- Ko-Ko at the Circus (1 May 1926)
- Toot Toot (aka. Koko's Toot Toot) (5 June 1926)
- Ko-Ko Hot After It (12 June 1926)
- The Fadeaway (1 September 1926)
- Ko-Ko Kidnapped (26 October 1926) (Lost)
- Ko-Ko's Queen (1 October 1926)
- Ko-Ko the Convict (1 November 1926)
- Ko-Ko Gets Egg-Cited (1 December 1926)
- Koko Back Tracks (aka. Koko in Reverse) (1 January 1927)
- Koko Makes 'Em Laugh (10 February 1927)
- Koko in 1999 (10 March 1927)
- Koko the Kavalier (10 April 1927)

=== Inkwell Imps (1927–1929) ===
- Koko Plays Pool (6 August 1927)
- Koko's Kane (20 August 1927)
- Koko the Knight (3 September 1927)
- Koko Hops Off (17 September 1927)
- Koko the Kop (1 October 1927)
- Koko Explores (15 October 1927)
- Koko Chops Suey (29 October 1927)
- Koko's Klock (26 November 1927)
- Koko's Kicks (30 November 1927)
- Koko's Quest (10 December 1927)
- Koko the Kid (24 December 1927)
- Koko's Kink (7 January 1928)
- Koko's Kozy Korner (21 January 1928)
- Koko's Germ Jam (4 February 1928)
- Koko's Bawth (18 February 1928)
- Koko Smokes (3 March 1928)
- Koko's Tattoo (17 March 1928)
- Koko's Earth Control (31 March 1928)
- Koko's Hot Dog (14 April 1928)
- Koko's Haunted House (28 April 1928)
- Koko Lamps Aladdin (12 May 1928)
- Koko Squeals (26 May 1928)
- Koko's Field Daze (9 June 1928)
- Koko Goes Over (23 June 1928)
- Koko's Catch (7 July 1928)
- Koko's War Dogs (21 July 1928)
- Koko's Chase (11 August 1928)
- Ko-Ko Heaves Ho (25 August 1928)
- Ko-Ko's Big Pull (7 September 1928)
- Ko-Ko Cleans Up (21 September 1928)
- Ko-Ko's Parade (8 October 1928)
- Ko-Ko's Dog Gone (22 October 1928)
- Ko-Ko in the Rough (3 November 1928)
- Ko-Ko's Magic (16 November 1928)
- Ko-Ko on the Track (4 December 1928)
- Ko-Ko's Act (17 December 1928)
- Ko-Ko's Courtship (28 December 1928)
- No Eyes Today (11 January 1929)
- Noise Annoys Ko-Ko (25 January 1929)
- Ko-Ko Beats Time (8 February 1929)
- Ko-Ko's Reward (23 February 1929)
- Ko-Ko's Hot Ink (8 March 1929)
- Ko-Ko's Crib (23 March 1929)
- Ko-Ko's Saxophonies (5 April 1929)
- Ko-Ko's Knock Down (19 April 1929)
- Ko-Ko's Signals (3 May 1929)
- Ko-Ko's Conquest (31 May 1929)
- Ko-Ko's Focus (17 April 1929)
- Ko-Ko's Harem Scarum (14 June 1929)
- Ko-Ko's Big Sale (28 June 1929)
- Ko-Ko's Hypnotism (12 July 1929)
- Chemical Ko-Ko (26 July 1929)

=== Out of the Inkwell (1962 TV series) ===
The following is a list of Out of the Inkwell cartoons produced by Hal Seeger, which aired in first-run syndication starting in 1962. They were distributed by Seven Arts Television.

No.	Title	Animation Direction
Pilot	East Side, West Side	Myron Waldman
1	Balloon Blues	
2	Koko Gottum Injun Trouble	
3	Koko Meets Boobnik	
4	Baby Face	Shamus Culhane
5	Flying Saucery	
6	Knight Work	
7	Kononut, Private Eye	
8	Love in Bloom	
9	Mean Moe Means Well	
10	Now You See It...Now You Don't!	
11	Polar Bear Facts	
12	Pow-Wow-Wow!	
13	The Egg and Me	
14	The Mystery Guest	
15	The Refriger-Raider	Al Eugster
16	A Fishy Story	
17	A Haunting We Will Go	Orestes Calpini
18	A Queen for a Day	
19	Bluebeard's Treasure	
20	Comic Strip	
21	Fastest Pop Gun in the West	
22	Gigantical	
23	In the Army	
24	Koko Meets Robin Hood	
25	Koko Roams in Rome	
26	Mean Moe Takes Over	
27	Mean Moe's Money Mad	
28	Moving Madness	
29	Mummy's the Word	
30	Reflection Land	
31	Success Story	
32	That's Show Biz	
33	The Big Bank Robbery	
34	TV or Not TV	
35	Whale of a Story	
36	Which Witch is Which	
37	Irving the Indian Nut	
38	Mad Scientist Gets Madder	
39	Mean Moe Rain Maker	
40	Medicine Man	
41	No Soap	
42	On With the Show	
43	Rodeo	
44	So Long, Ceylon	
45	Wild West Story	Tom Golden
46	A Dog Gone Snooper	
47	Arabian Daze	James Tyer
48	Comic Book Capers	
49	Enchanted Prince	
50	Extra Special Delivery	
51	Footloose Fox	
52	Make Room for Moe	
53	Plane Stupid	
54	Pony Express	
55	Sing-Along with Moe	James Tyer
56	Station Breaks	
57	Strictly from Lumber	
58	The Invisible One	James Tyer
59	The River Robbers	
60	Arty Party	Shamus Culhane
61	Blunder Down Under	
62	Growing Pains	
63	Koko in a London Fog	
64	Koko Meets Barney Beatnik	
65	Mean Moe and Cleopatra	
66	Mean Moe Gets the Bird	
67	Mean Moe the Great	
68	Mean Moe the Star	
69	Moe Moves In	James Tyer
70	Rocket Ranger	
71	Sold on Manhattan	
72	The Cliff-Hanger	
73	The Fan Letter	
74	You Are Here	
75	A Lot of Bull	
76	Achilles is a Heel	
77	Bomb-y Weather	
78	Fearless Female	
79	Funnyland	
80	Gone Hollywood	
81	Having a Hex of a Time	Tom Golden, Arnie Levey
82	Jungle Bungle	Al Eugster
83	Let George Do It	
84	Mean Moe Day	Myron Waldman
85	Mean Moe Tells William Tell	Myron Waldman
86	Mean Moe the Lion Tamer	
87	Mean Moe's Fairy Tale	
88	Musketeer Moe	
89	Romance Machine Made	
90	Sahara Today, Gone Tomorrow	
91	The Hillbillies	
92	The Sleeping Beauty	
93	The Unwashables	Tom Golden, Arnie Levey
94	Tic-Tac-Moe	
95	Who's Napoleon?	
96	Down to Earth	
97	Mayor Mean Moe	Myron Waldman
98	Mean Moe Cools Off	
99	Mean Moe's Side Show	
100	Speak for Yourself, Mean Moe	
