= John Randolph Bray =

American animator (1879–1978)

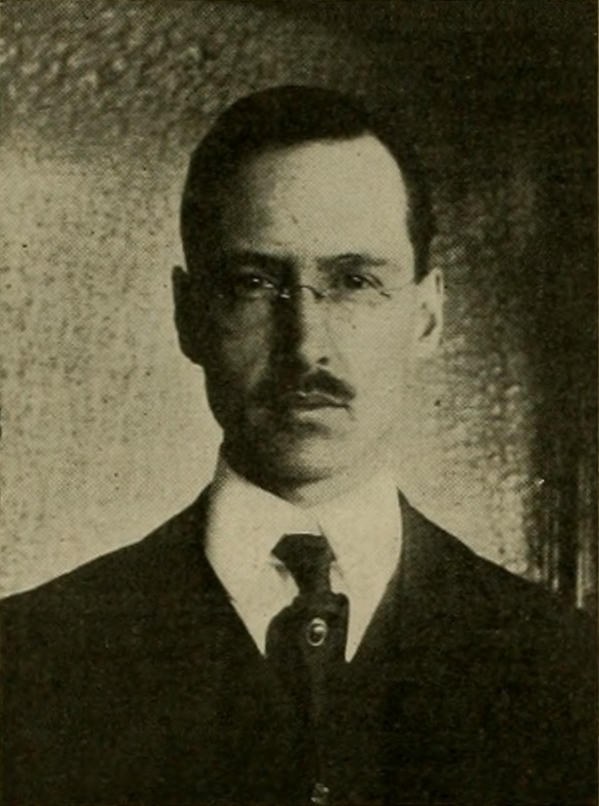
- Bray in 1915
- Born: August 25, 1879; Addison, Michigan, U.S.
- Died: October 10, 1978 (aged 99); Bridgeport, Connecticut, U.S.
- Occupation: Animator
- Spouse: Margaret Till (m. 1904; died 1967)

How Animated Cartoons Are Made (1919)

John Randolph Bray (August 25, 1879 – October 10, 1978) was an American animator, cartoonist, and film producer.

== Early life ==
John Randolph Bray was born in Addison, Michigan on August 25, 1879, to Methodist Presbyterian minister Edward Bray and his wife Sarah. He was educated at the Detroit School of Boys and the Detroit School of Art. Bray enrolled at the Michigan's Alma College for a degree in civil engineering, but dropped out after a year.

== Work ==
After he dropped out of college, Bray was a journalist for the Detroit Evening Press, however this proved fruitless. A couple years after this job, Bray landed a job for the Brooklyn Daily Eagle, in which he met his friend Max Fleischer. While he was in Brooklyn, he met an immigrant from Germany named Margaret Till, and they married in 1904. He worked for Judge from 1907 to 1909, drawing a comic named Little Johnny and the Teddy Bears, simply named The Teddy Bears in its first run.

Bray became interested in animation in the early years of moving pictures. In 1913, his first animated film was released, titled The Dachshund and the Sausage: A Comic Artist's Dream. By 1914, he opened a New York area studio specifically organized to make animated films. Unlike newspaper cartoonist Winsor McCay, who had been making short animated films for several years, Bray organized his studio according to the principles of industrial production, an approach that Raoul Barré, another animator, also adopted at around the same time.

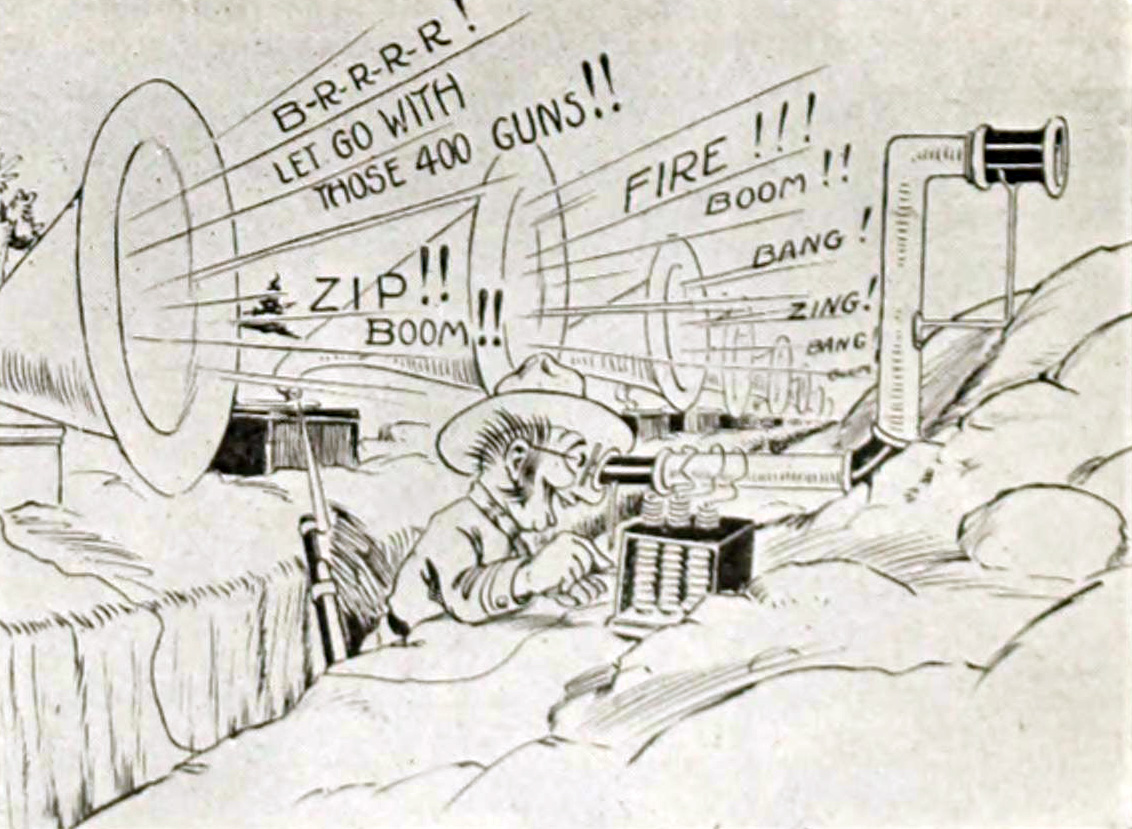
Colonel Heeza Liar and the Bandits (1916)

As the 1910s progressed, Bray's studio became a powerhouse in the early animation industry. The studio assembled a staff that included many accomplished animators, and it produced a steady and widely distributed stream of animated shorts. Bray contributed a series featuring his Colonel Heeza Liar series, which was among the most popular series of animated shorts in that era.

Bray Productions produced over 500 films between 1913 and 1937, mostly animation films and documentary shorts. Cartoonist Paul Terry worked briefly for Bray Studios in 1916. Bray produced the first animated film in color, The Debut of Thomas Cat (1920), in Brewster Color.

The entertainment branch of Bray Pictures Corporation closed in 1928. Documentary production for theatrical release continued through the late 1930s. The educational and commercial branch, Brayco, made mostly filmstrips from the 1920s until it closed in 1963. Bray Studios was still in operation in the 1990s due to his grandson Paul.

Jam Handy's company, the Jam Handy Organization, began as a Chicago-Detroit division of Bray Studios, to service the auto industry's need for industrial films. Jam Handy made several thousand industrial and sponsored films and tens of thousands of filmstrips, many for the auto industry, closed in 1973.

Bray visited Winsor McCay during his production of Gertie the Dinosaur and claimed to be a journalist writing an article about animation. McCay was very open about the techniques that he developed and showed all the details to Bray. John Randolph Bray later patented many of McCay's methods and unsuccessfully tried to sue the other animator; McCay prevailed, however, and received royalties from Bray for several years thereafter.

== Later life ==
Bray celebrated his 96th birthday at the Museum of Modern Art, which presented his films from August 25 to August 31, 1975. At the reception of the showings, he said, "I don't know what to say because it's been so many years since I've had to do with film. You'll have to excuse me a little bit, because my memory is pretty well gone."

J.R. Bray died at his home in Bridgeport, Connecticut on October 10, 1978, at the age of 99.
