= T. E. Powers =

American cartoonist (1870-1939)

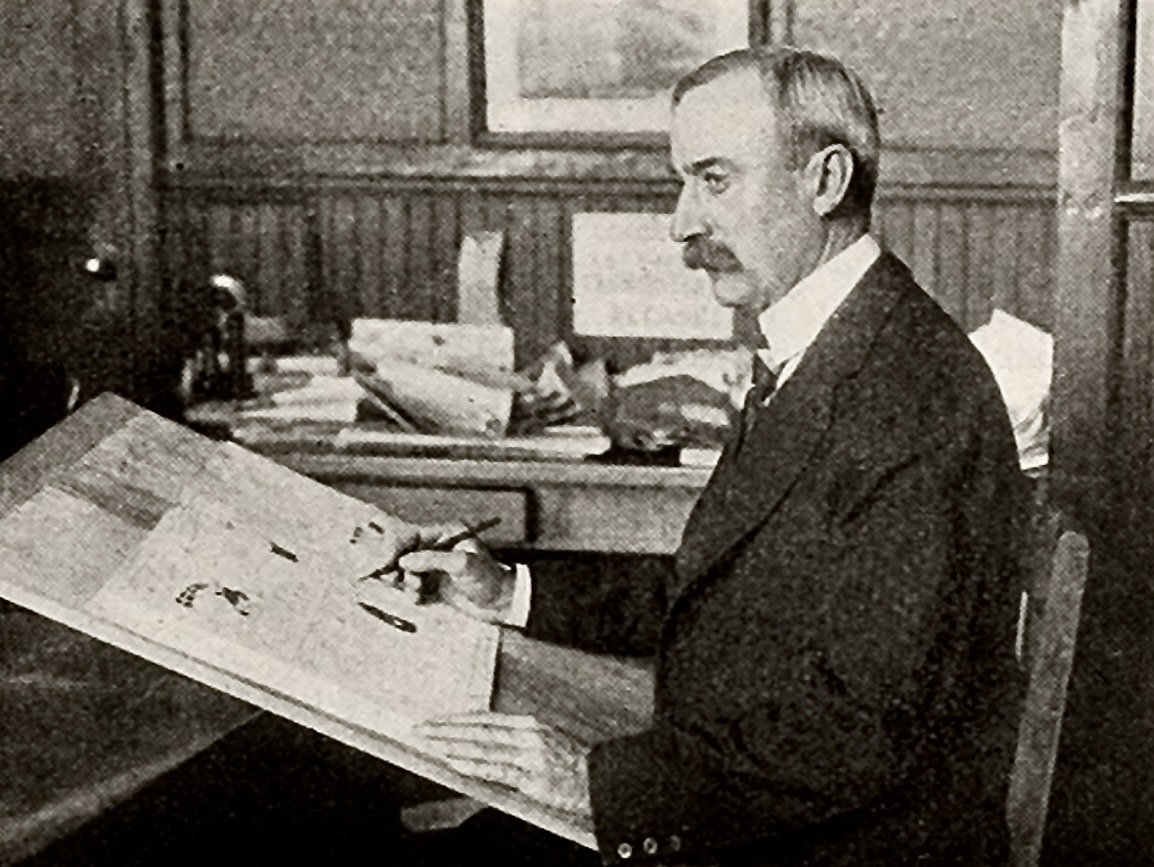
- The Moving Picture World, 1916
- Born: Thomas E. Powers; July 4, 1870; Milwaukee, Wisconsin; United States
- Died: August 14, 1939 (aged 69); Long Beach, New York; United States
- Occupations: Comic-strip artist, editorial cartoonist, caricaturist, animation supervisor, landscape and seascape painter
- Years active: 1889–1937
- Spouse(s): Louise Hyde Powers (m.1895–1939; his death)
- Children: None

Thomas E. Powers (most often identified and professionally credited as T. E. Powers, but also early in his career as Tom Powers, Tom E. Powers, and TEP; July 4, 1870 – August 18, 1939) was an American comic-strip artist, editorial cartoonist, and caricaturist whose drawings were published in newspapers across the United States between 1889 and 1937. The Wisconsin native, reported to be President Theodore Roosevelt's favorite "political cartoonist", spent four decades of his career employed by William Randolph Hearst's vast newspaper chain, initially joining the flagship of that chain, the New York Journal, in 1896.

Power's popular comic-strip characters were widely used as well in commercial advertisements in the early 1900s and later as themes in product lines of children's toys. Between 1915 and 1922, some his pen-and-ink creations would also "come to life" in animated shorts. Those comic films were presented in both domestic and foreign cinemas as part of Hearst-Vitagraph newsreels. Powers' body of work is enormous. It is estimated that he produced more than 15,000 drawings for newspapers and other publications during his long career. Given the scope of his work and his influence on American journalism, politics, and popular culture, T. E. Powers ranks among the leading satirical artists of the early twentieth century.

== Early life and initial jobs ==
Thomas Powers was born in 1870 in Milwaukee, Wisconsin. (Note: Thomas Powers' full middle name remains unverified either by his birth records, obituaries, or by the few available biographical sketches about him. With rare exceptions in period texts related to the cartoonist, he is referred to as either "T. E. Powers" or "Thomas E. Powers" without expansion of his middle initial. On Wikimedia Commons, one digital image of a cartoon page drawn by Powers and published in a 1901 issue of the World, has a cutline in modern typography along its bottom edge that attributes the page's drawings to "Ted Powers". The use of the familiar "Ted" implies that Powers' middle name was "Edward"; but Ted in this modern caption is very likely either a typo or was due to a misreading of Powers' handwritten credit signature. Even staff searches of the extensive collections held at The Billy Ireland Cartoon Library and Museum at Ohio State University and at The Wisconsin Historical Society have, as yet, not revealed Powers' middle name.) In his youth he moved with his family to Kansas City, Missouri, where he completed his secondary education and obtained his first jobs. Tom demonstrated at an early age a natural talent for drawing caricatures and other forms of cartoons, an ability that got him in trouble at school for decorating classroom blackboards with unflattering portraits of his teachers. His mischievous artwork also cost him his first paid position as a clerk in a local grocery, being fired there for sketching images of his boss on sheets of the store's wrapping paper. Tom was next employed by a Kansas City lithographer, although he soon quit that job. Nearly two decades later, in a 1906 interview with the news weekly The Editor and Publisher, he explained why he left that position:

"When I was about seventeen years of age [c.1887] I went to work for a lithographer who estimated that I was well worth $2 a week. I also received a goodly supply of advice on the subject of saving money. But, in spite of all he said, I squandered my money, with carelessness, recklessness and negligence...My employer said that I would never be able to draw. I was offended and resigned...."

By 1889, the self-taught artist had finally managed to save sufficient funds from another job to leave Kansas City and relocate to Chicago. There Powers enrolled in formal, part-time art classes and also secured employment as an illustrator and cartoonist. While attending school at night, he worked days for the Chicago Daily News under the direction of Victor Lawson, who hired the young man after seeing some of his sketches. Soon, at least by 1892, Chicago voting records document that Powers had already begun using the initials of his first and middle names –"T. E."–to identify himself and his drawings, a practice he continued to employ with relatively few exceptions for the remainder of his long career.

=== Move from Chicago to New York City, 1894 ===
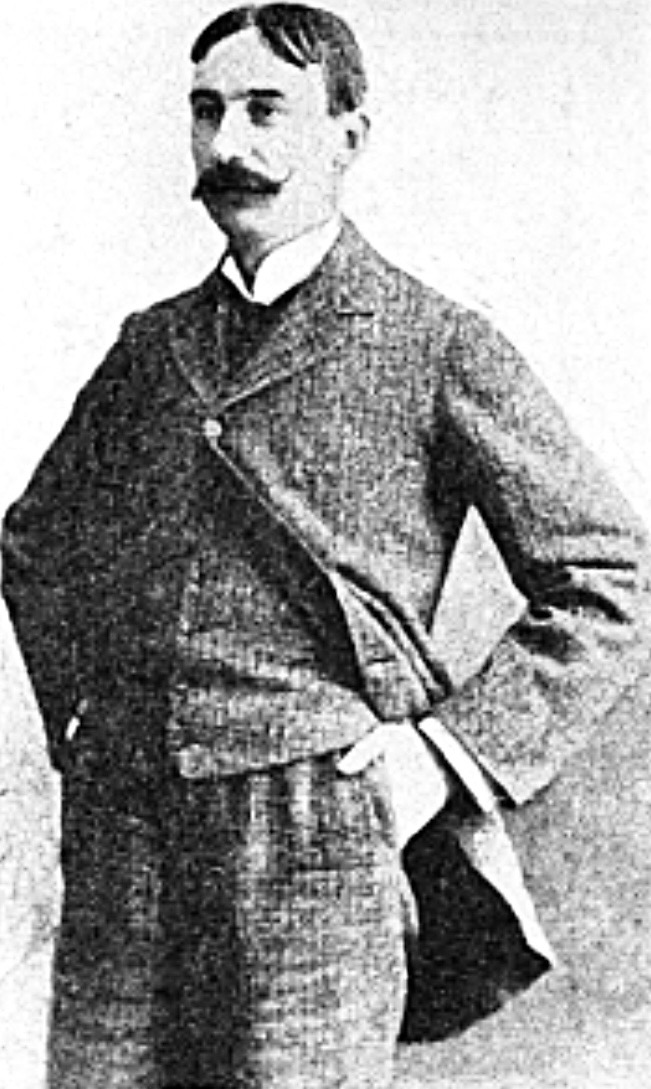
Powers, c. 1896

In Chicago, Powers did additional artwork for another newspaper, the Chicago Herald, before accepting a "lucrative offer" in 1894 from newspaper editor Arthur Brisbane to move to Manhattan to join the staff of the widely popular New York World. That newspaper was owned by Joseph Pulitzer, who at the time was recognized as "the foremost newspaper publisher in the world." That lofty status, however, began to be seriously challenged in November 1895, when William Randolph Hearst acquired the New York Journal, which would become the flagship of a network of newspapers he intended to establish across the United States. (Note: In 1901 the "original" New York Journal was renamed by Hearst as the New York American and remained a morning newspaper; the newly established New York Evening Journal then served as a late-afternoon paper. Both newspapers were published by Hearst from 1895 until 1937, when the American and Evening Journal merged.) Under Hearst's new management that year, the Journal experienced a remarkable increase in daily readership, rising from 30,000 to 100,000 in just a single month and then, after a year, to over 430,000. In order to sustain such growth and eclipse Pulitzer's success in the two publishers' fierce circulation war, Hearst implemented a plan to bring together at the Journal the finest editors, reporters, and illustrators in American journalism. In 1896 he lured Brisbane away from the World; and the following year Brisbane, now chief editor and noted columnist at the Journal, coaxed Powers to leave the World as well and to join a stellar group of cartoonists being assembled by Hearst, one that included such artists as Homer Davenport, Richard Outcault, Frederick Opper, and Jimmy Swinnerton.

== Powers' early years with Hearst, 1896-1913 ==
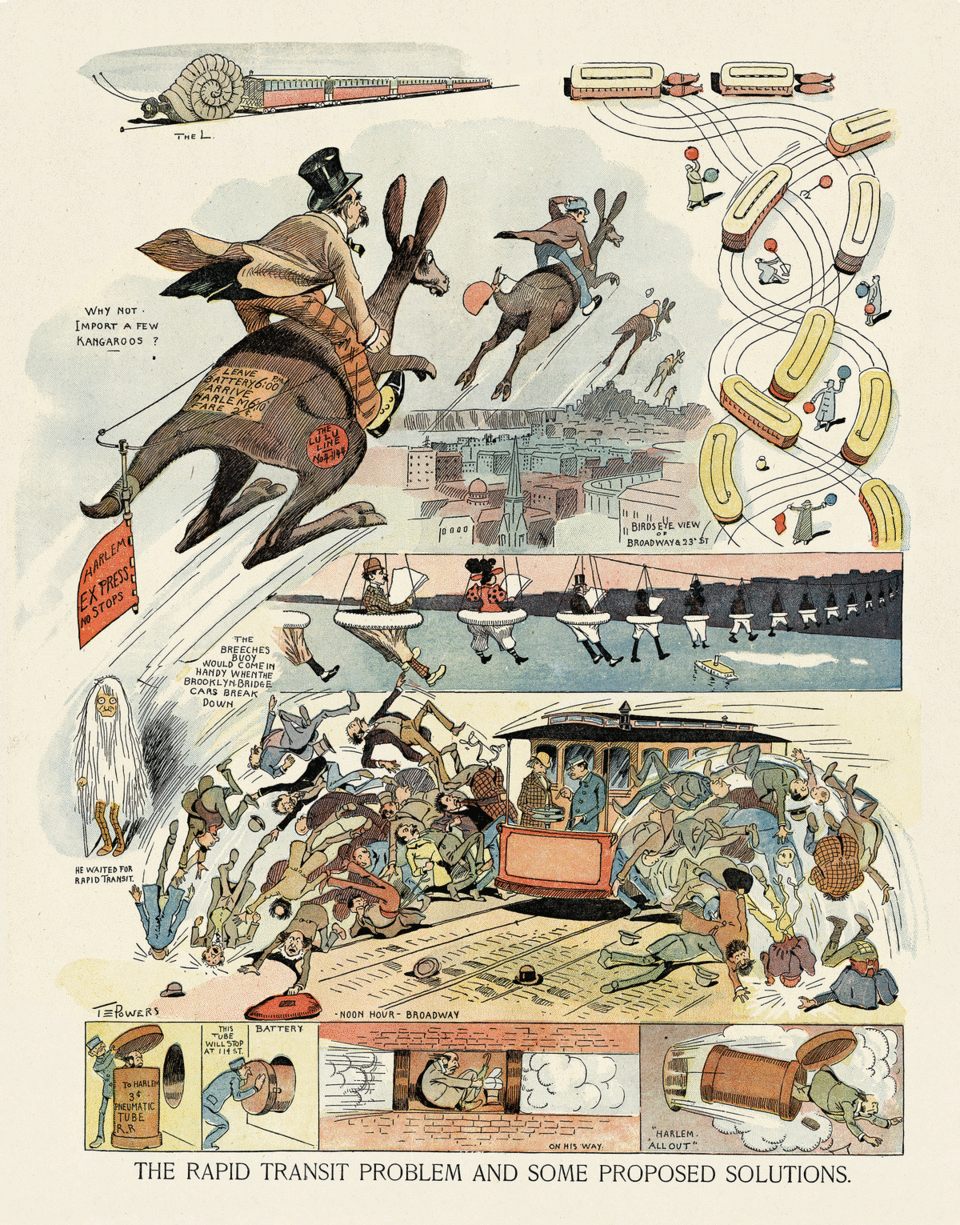
Powers' solutions for urban transit problems, New York World, 1896

After T. E. Powers joined Hearst's newspaper in 1896, Joseph Pulitzer soon convinced him to return to the World under a new, more generous contract. Like Hearst, Pulitzer knew that "Nothing attracted readers and distinguished a newspaper from its competitors like a brilliant cartoonist." Hearst, in turn, countered with an even more attractive offer for Powers to come back to the Journal. A court trial then ensued over this employment tug-of-war; and while those proceedings continued, Powers was prohibited from doing work for either publisher. Nevertheless, until the litigation's resolution, both Pulitzer and Hearst were required to pay the cartoonist the full salaries that each of them had specified in their contract offers to him. That trial condition, paying Powers two salaries "for doing nothing", made T. E. "the envy of newspaperdom". Ultimately, Hearst prevailed in court and secured the services of the 26-year-old artist. Powers from that point forward spent the remainder of his long career working for what became Hearst's vast newspaper empire. While the cartoonist's transfer to the Journal was legally upheld, Pulitzer still owned the exclusive rights to all of Powers' drawings that had been published while he was an employee of the World from 1894 to 1896. Also, the ongoing appearances of new content created by him and published in the World for the next decade indicate that Hearst's court victory over Pulitzer was neither entirely clearcut nor complete.

=== Continuing presence of Powers' work in the World ===
Given his corporation's legal battle to secure Powers' services, it seems unlikely that William Hearst would voluntarily permit his new staff artist on the Journal to publish any more original content for his greatest competitor. Yet, the continuing appearance of Powers' work in the World for a decade after 1896 and his repeated identification in that newspaper and in others as the Pulitzer daily's caricaturist and special-assignment interviewer raises many questions regarding the court's final ruling in Powers' employment trial. The cartoonist's ongoing associations with the World provide evidence that there were conditions and details in the judgment that allowed Powers, as a freelancer for prescribed periods, to provide material for publication in the World and credited specifically to that publication. Accordingly, many of his comic strips, front-page editorial panels, caricatures, interviews with prominent people, and investigative articles carrying the byline "T. E. Powers" can be found prominently featured in issues of the World until at least January 1906.

A 1904 news report in The Press, the local newspaper of Stafford Springs, Connecticut, confirms that Powers had service contracts with Pulitzer's World and that those contracts included restrictions on what work he could perform for Hearst's publications. (Note: Stafford Springs, Connecticut, is the birthplace of T. E. Powers' wife, Louise Hyde Powers. That is likely why news involving Louise's husband would be reported in The Press and would be of particular interest to that newspaper's readers.) Referring to Powers as "the cartoonist of the New York World", The Press reports in its April 20 issue that he was apparently "still in trouble", noting an earlier incident in Stafford Springs when Pulitzer-hired New York private detectives were spotted in the "village" following Powers to make sure he was not performing work for Hearst that would violate his contract with the World. The Press in the cited issue also provides a copy of a report published three days earlier in the Hartford Courant that pertains to a judicial action against Powers involving his existing contract with the World:

Bridgeport, April 17.–Judge Roraback of the superior court has granted a temporary injunction to the publishers of the New York World restraining Thomas E. Powers of Norwalk, (Note: According to U.S. census records and the reference to Norwalk in this report, sometime between 1900 and 1904, T. E. Powers and his wife Louise purchased a farmhouse in Norwalk, Connecticut, which is located approximately 45 miles northeast of mid-town Manhattan and about 95 miles south of Stafford Springs. That property was their principal residence for nearly three decades. The frequent comic strips and editorial cartoons drawn by Powers at his Norwalk home were delivered by couriers to the Manhattan-based offices of Hearst's Journal until the mid-1930s and to Pulitzer's World until at least February 1906.) a cartoonist, from performing any work in that line for William R. Hearst and S. G. Carvalho, (Note: Solomon G. Carvalho was an experienced editor and newspaper circulation expert who worked for Pulitzer before leaving the World to accept employment with Hearst's newspaper chain. See Swanberg, p. 183.) engaged in the publication of the Boston American at Boston, Mass. The complaint sets forth that Mr. Powers made a contract to give his time and professional skill to the petitioners for two years from January 29, 1904, for not less than $10,400 a year, and that, in spite of the agreement, Powers has failed to perform his part of the contract and intends to transfer his services to the Evening Journal Publishing Company. Galen A. Charter [sic] (Note: "Galen A. Charter" is very likely a typo and an actual reference to Galen A. Carter, a Connecticut politician and prominent Stamford lawyer.) of Stamford is counsel for the World. The injunction restrains Mr. Powers from performing any work for the Boston American, Mr. Hearst or Mr. Carvalho under a penalty of $10,000.

The following are a few examples of the type of assignments that Powers performed after 1896 under his service contracts with the World.

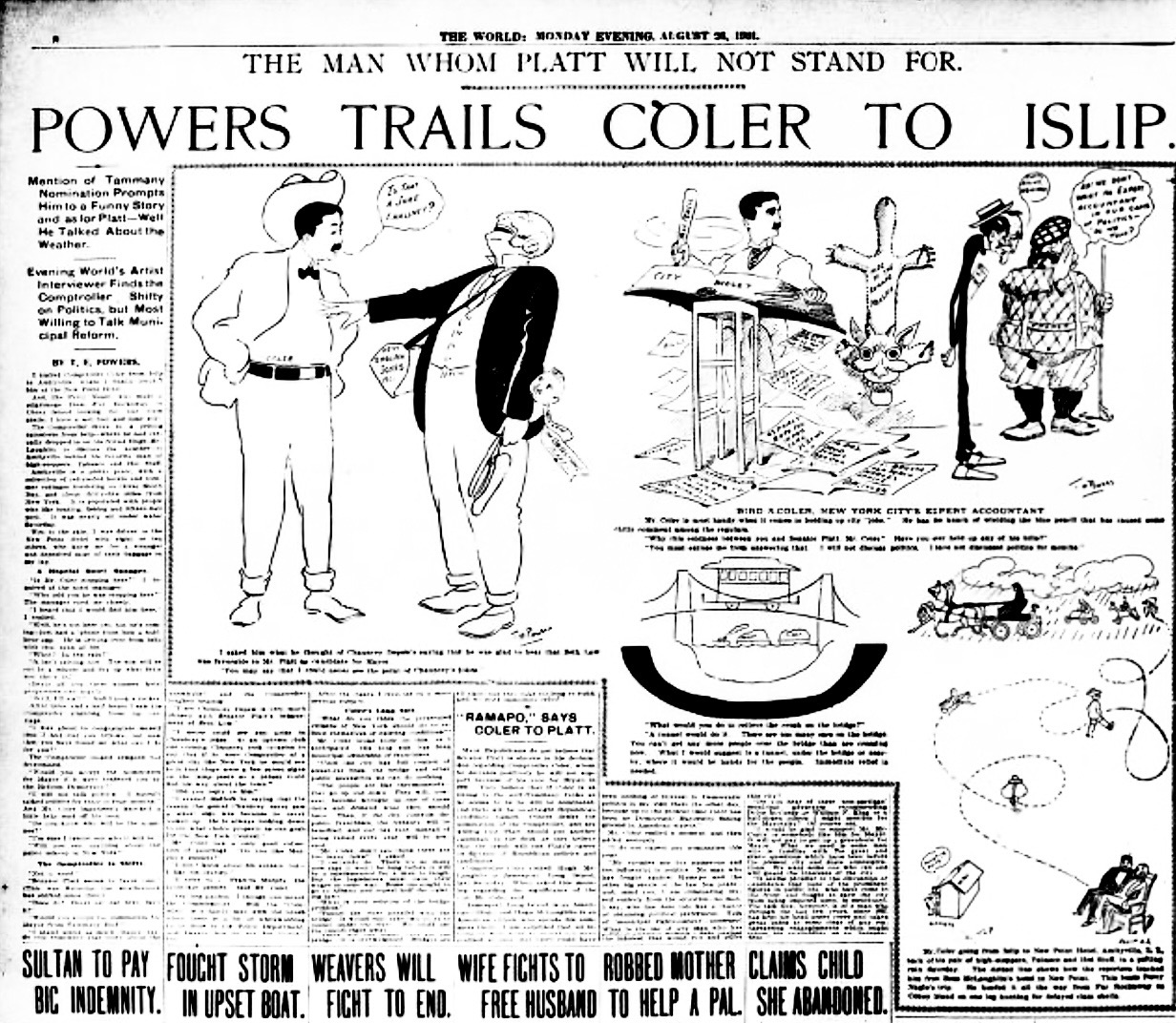
Investigative report written and Illustrated by Powers for the New York Evening World, August 1901

The August 26, 1901 issue of the World features a half-page news story credited to Powers, accompanied by his illustrations and under the very bold heading "POWERS TRAILS COLER TO ISLIP". The cartoonist, who is identified in the article as the "Evening World's Artist Interviewer", recounts in detail how he had recently followed New York City's "shifty" comptroller Bird Sim Coler for 15 miles on Long Island, from Amityville to Islip, in order to obtain for Pulitzer's newspaper an exclusive interview with the controversial official. Powers is once again identified as the "World's famous caricaturist" in a May 2, 1902 promotion for another interview he conducted on behalf of the newspaper, one with the "astonishingly successful Wall street millionaire" John W. Gates. The resulting article, titled "John W. Gates Interviewed by T. E. Powers", promised to reveal the "secret of Mr. Gates's success". Illustrated again with "Powers's pictures", the feature was scheduled for release in the next Sunday edition of the World.

Yet another example of Powers' continuing work for the World relates to the 1905 Wall Street scandal and its associated trials involving James Hazen Hyde, then the vice president of the prestigious financial services and insurance company Equitable Holdings. During one of the trials, Powers attended the proceedings to sketch full- and half-figure caricatures of Hyde. Those images are accompanied by the artist's comments regarding the young man's dapper attire and his physical appearance while testifying on the witness stand. Those images can be viewed on two pages in the November 15, 1905 edition of the World.

A fourth and final example of Powers' work appearing in the World relates to another high-profile trial involving Standard Oil executive Henry Huttleston Rogers, who served as a key witness in a lawsuit concerning an alleged monopoly conspiracy by Standard Oil in the state of Missouri. In a very large single-panel editorial cartoon, Powers depicts in caricature a cavalier Rogers seated in court in the witness chair and being cross-examined by Missouri Attorney General Herbert S. Hadley as a trio of other lawyers look on with wide-eyed interest. Powers' cartoon also shows John D. Rockefeller, the founder of Standard Oil, with a small halo above his head as he sits next to Rogers. As Hadley simply asks Rogers the question, inside a dialog bubble, "What is Your Name?", Rockefeller interjects and responds on Rogers' behalf, proclaiming "We Refuse to Answer". In another chair behind Rockefeller sits his nephew William G. Rockefeller, who at the time was treasurer of the giant oil company. Mocking the exceedingly slow pace of the trial, Powers shows all the characters in his cartoon with extremely long white beards, visually implying that the tedious proceedings might take years to conclude.

Less than a month after the publication of the caricature of Henry H. Rogers in the cited Standard Oil trial, the trade weekly The Editor and Publisher announced Powers' return to full-time employment with the Hearst chain's flagship newspaper the Journal. That announcement, titled "Journal Gets T. E. Powers", is in the February 3, 1906 issue of The Editor and Publisher and states the following:

T. E. Powers, for some time cartoonist on the New York Evening World, is now drawing for the New York Evening Journal. The Journal's wagons [newspaper delivery vehicles] were at once plastered with posters announcing the acquisition. Mr. Powers was with the Evening Journal before he went to the World.

=== Comic strips and single-panel cartoons under Hearst ===
Until Power's retirement from the Hearst Corporation in 1937, all of his published drawings for the company reflected the political, economic, and social opinions of his employer and aligned with the established editorial policies of his principal New York-based newspapers, the Journal and the American. Powers' cartoons and those created by his colleagues were seen each day by millions upon millions of readers, not only by Hearst-owned newspapers but also through Hearst's syndication network of client newspapers. That network consisted of hundreds of other independent, third-party newspapers and other publications that paid fees for the rights to republish news articles, opinion columns, editorial cartoons, comic strips, and other content produced by Hearst's employees. At its height in the 1920s and early 1930s, the Hearst Corporation owned 28 newspapers in every major American city, and those papers, combined, had a daily circulation of nearly 13 million readers. The addition of the network-affiliated newspapers increased the total readership to nearly 20 million Americans who received all or much of their news and other daily print information from Hearst sources.

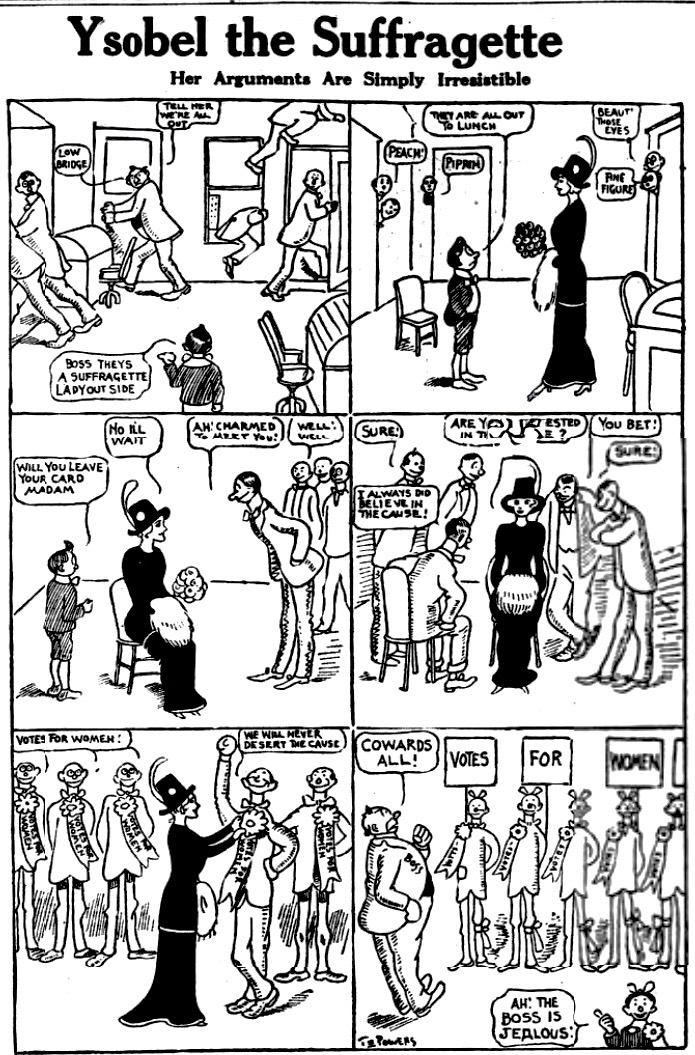
One of Powers' popular comic-strip series, Ysobel the Suffragette, 1911

Powers over time became one of William Hearst's favorite staff artists as T. E.'s comic strips and single-panel cartoons gained a large and loyal following for Hearst's newspapers and for the steadily rising number of client newspapers under syndication. By 1916, Hearst-Vitagraph advertisements in trade journals were announcing that "Five hundred newspapers today are using the great Tom Powers cartoons." The commercial and critical success of those pen-and-ink creations were perhaps due to how relatable their themes were to many readers. Powers' drawings regularly portrayed and lampooned the everyday challenges facing the inhabitants of New York City and in other cities where residents coped with the rigors of parenthood set in urban environments, dealing with troublesome neighbors, balancing tight family budgets, commuting woes, keeping up with changing fashion trends, as well as with a host of other local social, economic, and political issues. Some of the titles of Powers' comic-strip series are How'd You'd Like to be Charlie?; Home, Sweet Home; Mr. Nobody Holme; Mrs. Trubbell; Ysobel The Suffragette; Never Again; The Down-and-Out Club; Sam the Drummer; Married Life From the Inside; The League of Husbands; and The Nut Club. (Note: The cited cartoon titles, as well as many others created by Powers, can be seen by searching "T. E. Powers" between the years 1900 and 1937 in the Library of Congress online database Chronicling America, which is referenced herein.)

=== "Joy" and "Gloom" ===
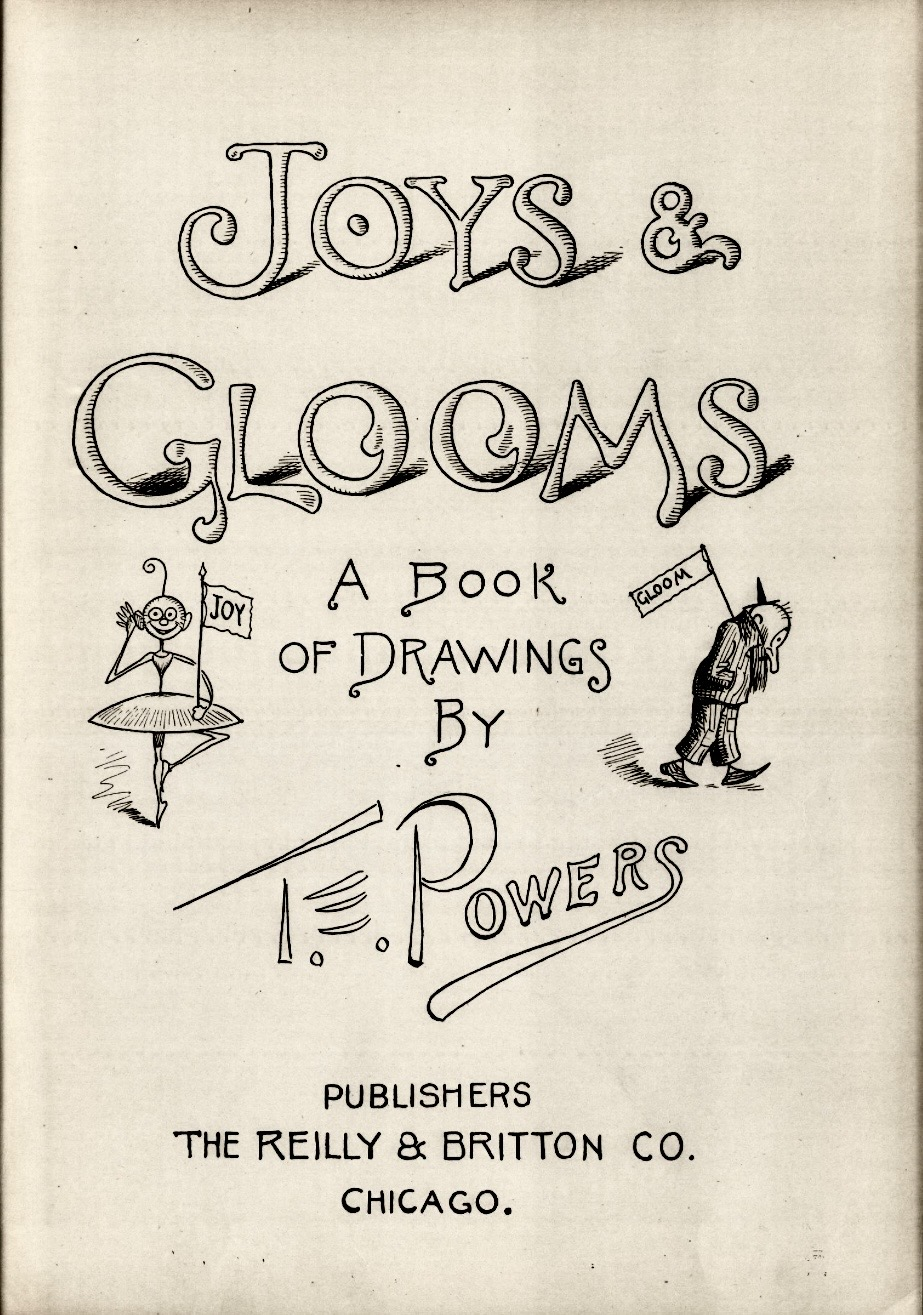
Title page of Powers' 1912 book showing the characters "Joy"and "Gloom"

To enhance the theme of his drawings and to underscore the emotional tone of their storylines and intended messaging, Powers began adding to his cartoon panels two little, very simply drawn, pixie-like characters. One is a round-headed female stick figure he named "Joy". Ever-smiling, she wears a stylized tutu and ballet slippers and has a single strand of hair curling upward from the top of her head. The other character, "Gloom", is Joy's relentless enemy. A dour male figure, he wears a small black pointed hat, often a coat and long pants, and has a face dominated by a long nose and straight black whiskers. Joy and Gloom often appear together in Powers' cartoons; at other times separately, occupying spaces in the foreground of his comic strips or frolicking in the bottom corners of panels. The two diametric emotions also occasionally mobilize and lead their respective groups of equally joyful or gloomy allies, who when acting in unison within Powers' cartoon panels serve as "miniature Greek-chorus characters". Joy and Gloom and their comrades quickly became recognized by the public at large as trademarks of Powers' artwork; and before long their appearances began to expand beyond the bounds of his comic strips, being "generally employed", as The New York Times describes it, "as pictorial footnotes to his editorial cartoons."

The first appearance of Joy and Gloom in a published drawing by Powers remains undetermined, although the two figures began to be seen with increasing frequency in his newspaper strips and editorial panels in 1910. Joy and Gloom quickly became popular, so much so that the Chicago publishing firm Reilly and Britton sought to capitalize on the cartoon characters broad appeal and in January 1912 announced the release of a 72-page book titled Joys and Glooms: A Book of Drawings by T. E. Powers. In the foreword of this compilation of drawings, readers are greeted with the following upbeat message from Powers, a greeting that also summarizes the constant battles between the forces of Joy and Gloom:

May this book cause the Joys to banish the Glooms from among those who turn these pages. When old Field Marshal Gloom and his staff meet you in the street and General Despair hisses in your ear, “I'll Get You Yet!" remember the brave and gallant army of General Joy, always within call. . . . Beat the drum; and troops of Joy will scatter the regiments of Misery, Anguish, Revenge, Worry, Jealousy and Envy. Optimism will pluck handfuls out of the beard of Old Grouch. Good Cheer will send Jinx Hoodoo on the run. Don't be a Gloom. Be a Joy. It is so easy.

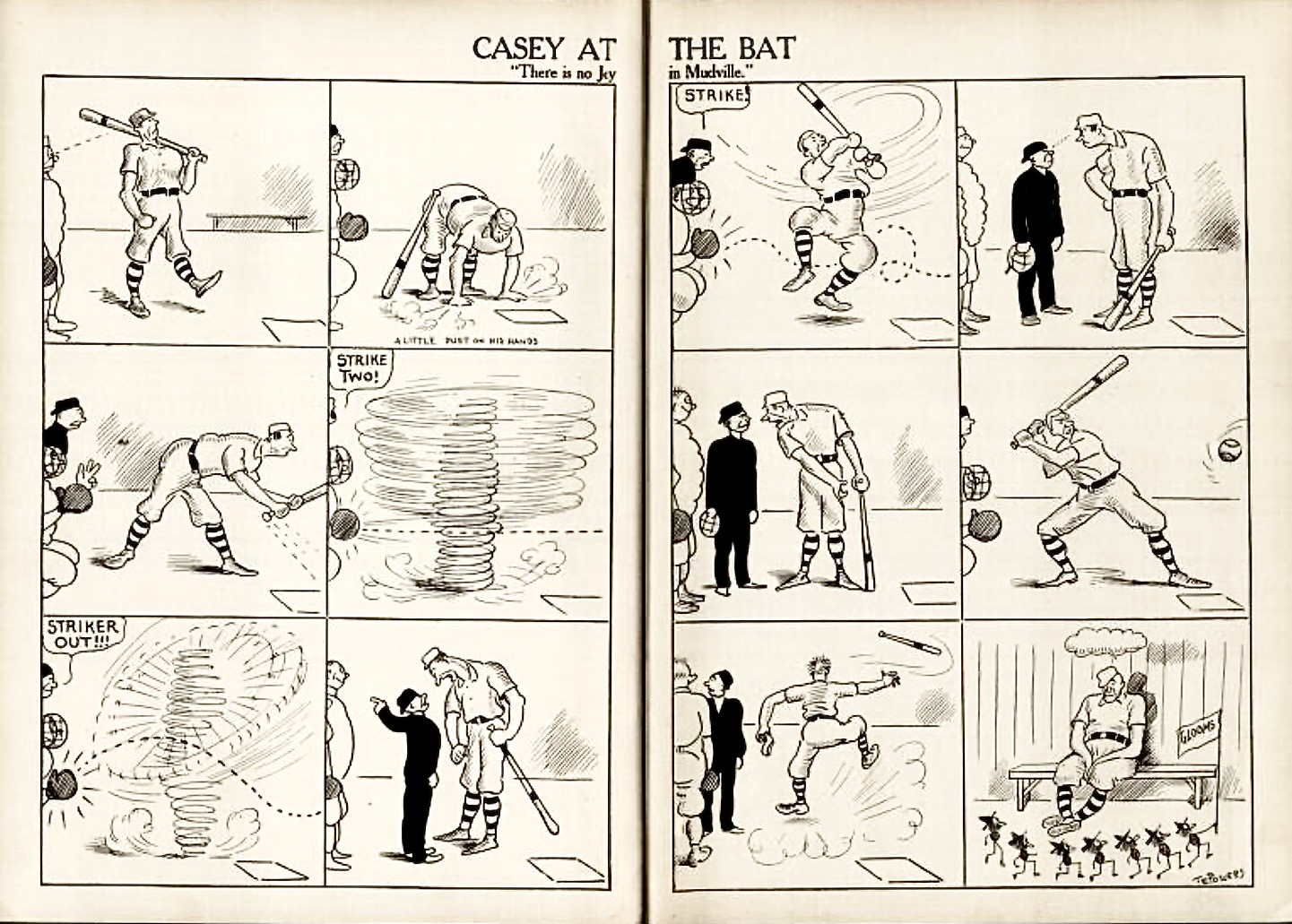
Powers' 1912 portrayal of the 1888 poem "Casey at the Bat"

Selections of Powers' cartoon panels in his 1912 book portray with both slapstick action and wry humor a wide range of subjects, such as con men, superstitions, job and marriage frustrations, the campaign for women's suffrage, daily life in urban and rural settings, health issues, and sports. One highlight in the book is Powers' 12-panel illustration of Ernest Thayer's 1888 mock-heroic poem "Casey at the Bat". In the final panel of Powers' depiction of that poem, the "mighty" baseball player Casey sits despondently on his Mudville team's bench after striking out and losing the game. Above his head is a small raincloud, while in the panel's foreground a troop of seven Glooms marches triumphantly in celebration of his failure.

==== Joy and Gloom toys ====
Powers' use of Joy and Gloom in many of his published drawings continued for another 25 years, until the cartoonist's retirement from Hearst in 1937. Later examples of his little characters' ongoing popularity are the "Joy & Gloom" fabric novelty dolls and wooden pullstring toys marketed by manufacturers from 1926 through 1928. In the August 1926 edition of the wholesale toy catalog Playthings, the Unique Novelty Company of New York advertises its Joy and Gloom "Flapper" dolls "Designed by the Celebrated Cartoonist, T. E. Powers". The cloth dolls were being offered at wholesale for $16 per dozen ($290 today).

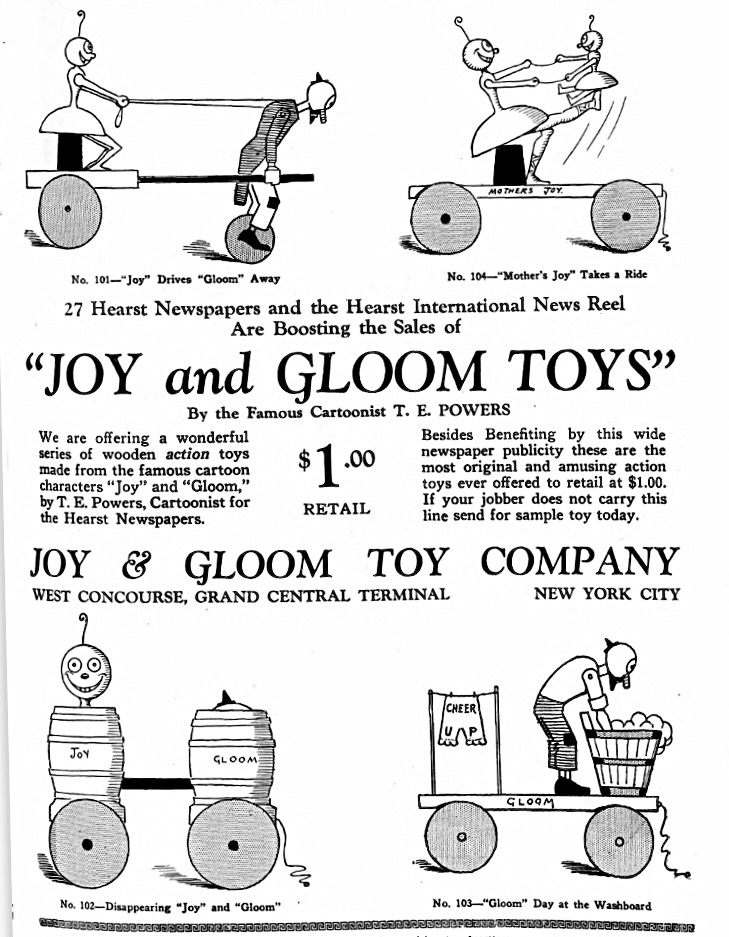
Ad for pullstring toys based on Joy and Gloom, 1926

Powers soon partnered with businessman H. L. Rollens to establish the Joy and Gloom Toy Company to produce a line of "very clever wooden action pull toys", complete with moving jointed figures of the two tiny creations. Advertisements for Joy and Gloom pullstring toys can also be found in 1926 issues of Playthings. One advertisement in the catalog grandly states that "these are the most original and amusing action toys ever offered to retail at $1.00" ($20 today). The four different versions of the toy were initially sold at the company's offices in the West Concourse of Grand Central Terminal and then elsewhere in New York. By October 1926, however, Powers and Rollens had appointed the Strobel-Wilken Company, also headquartered in New York City, to be the "Sole Selling Agents in the United States" of Joy and Gloom Toys. The wooden amusements were also promoted personally by Powers, "praised" in the print media by actor-humorist Will Rogers, and marketed nationally to adults as well as to children in news items and advertisements repeated in 400 Hearst-affiliated newspapers.

=== Political caricatures and editorial cartoons ===
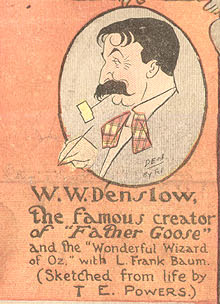
Caricature of fellow artist W. W. Denslow, 1900

T. E. Powers' comic strips were admired for decades by his colleagues, not only for their sheer comedy but also for their uncomplicated style in execution. The Washington Times attempts in its February 23, 1927 issue to focus some attention on and appreciation for that aspect of Powers' work, more specifically for its patrons with little or no knowledge of artistic techniques. In a brief commentary in the cited issue, The Times directs its readers to turn to that day's editorial page to examine the featured cartoon by the "master draughtsman". "Notice how few lines he uses, instructs The Times, "to get the action, the expression, the impression." It adds, "Powers is as solemn as an owl. A few quick strokes and you've caught his meaning." Twelve years later, after the cartoonist's death in August 1939, The Sun newspaper in Baltimore, Maryland reviewed his career and also commented on the deceptive simplicity of his drawings. The Sun revealed too which one of Powers' caricatures was his personal favorite:

Using a relatively simple line-drawing technique, which looked easy to duplicate but was not, Mr. Powers had a gift for caricature. His own favorite cartoon was one he drew of President Calvin Coolidge sawing wood. Mr. Coolidge liked the drawing and his request for the original, on White House stationery, was one of the cartoonist's most cherished mementos...While conceding that few caricatures were flattering, Mr. Powers once observed that he had encountered few men who objected to being caricatured. "In fact," he said, "most of them seem to like it."

As Powers' career progressed, his "simple" caricatures were increasingly employed in Hearst newspapers and magazines to underscore the chain's political opinions and to illustrate news items, investigative reports, and human-interest stories. Powers' output of editorial cartoons began to rise steadily in the early 1900s, especially during the presidential term of Theodore Roosevelt.

==== Cartoon support for President Roosevelt's "progressive thought", 1901-1909 ====
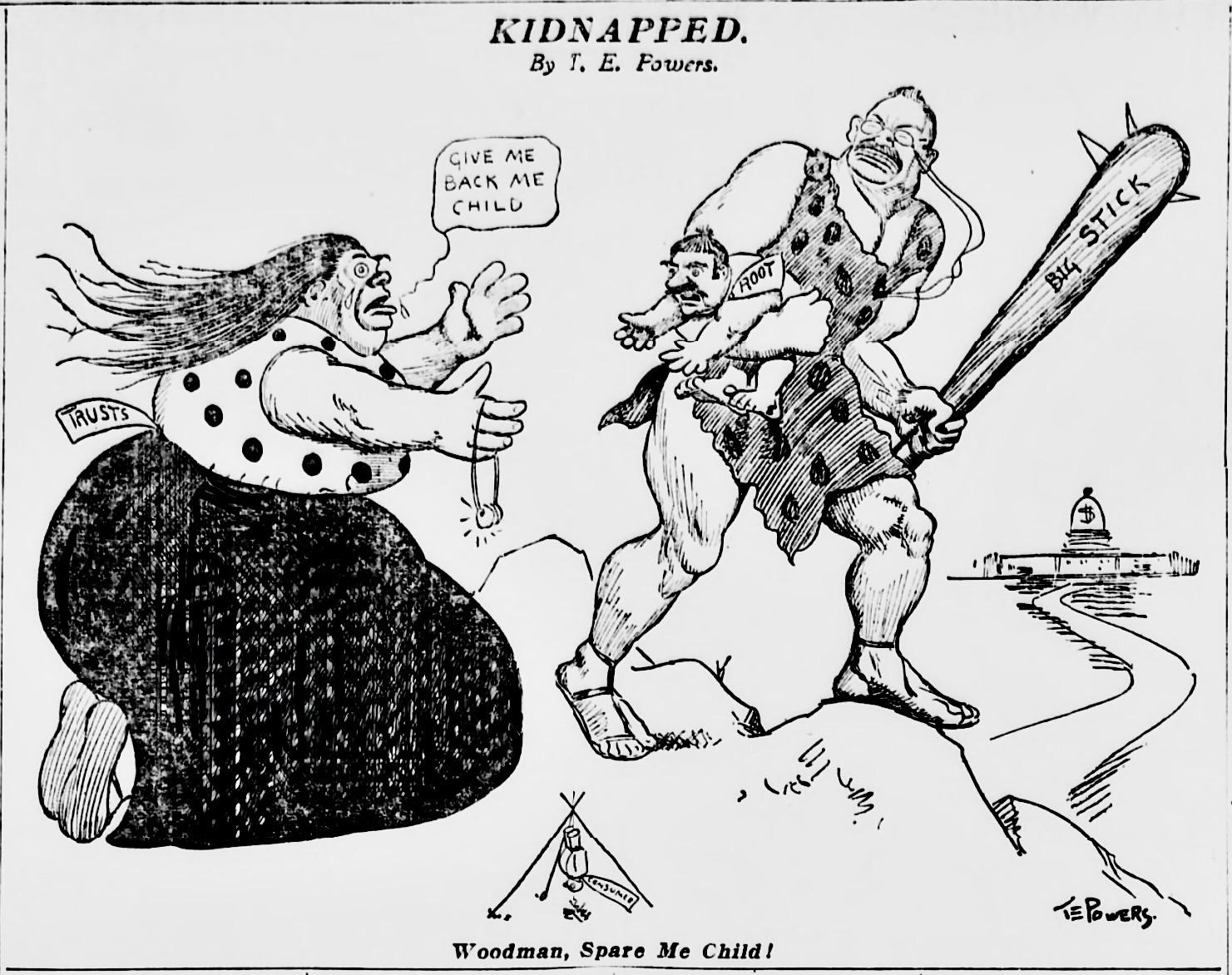
President Roosevelt with his trust-busting "Big Stick", 1905

William Hearst's newspapers and many other American dailies enthusiastically supported the United States' war with Spain in 1898. In their extensive press coverage of that brief conflict, Colonel Theodore Roosevelt became a subject of keen public interest for his role as the "intrepid leader" of the "Rough Riders" and that cavalry regiment's actions against Spanish troops in Cuba. All the sensational publicity surrounding Roosevelt's military exploits elevated him from being a formerly "obscure Cabinet assistant" in the McKinley Administration to becoming a war hero and rising star in American politics. Yet, "T. R.'s" celebrity did not guarantee continuing support on the opinion pages and comic panels of Hearst's newspapers. Later in 1898, when Roosevelt ran as the Republican Party's gubernatorial candidate in the State of New York, Hearst, a pro-Democrat, backed instead his opponent in that election, Augustus Van Wyck. Roosevelt still won the contest, although narrowly.

While Hearst and his newspaper staff did not support Roosevelt's New York campaign in 1898, they did support much of his progressive agenda as governor, including the Republican's efforts to curb government and corporate corruption and enact policies to curb increasing monopolistic business practices. Later, in 1901, when Roosevelt as vice president of the United States succeeded to the presidency after William McKinley's assassination, the new president once again found support for his "Square Deal" progressive policies in the investigative reports, editorials, and in the political cartoons and comic strips featured in Hearst's publications. It was during this period when it was reported that Powers had become Roosevelt's favorite newspaper cartoonist, especially after the artist portrayed the chief executive "threatening fat, silk-hatted figures labeled 'The Trusts' with the then famous 'big stick'".

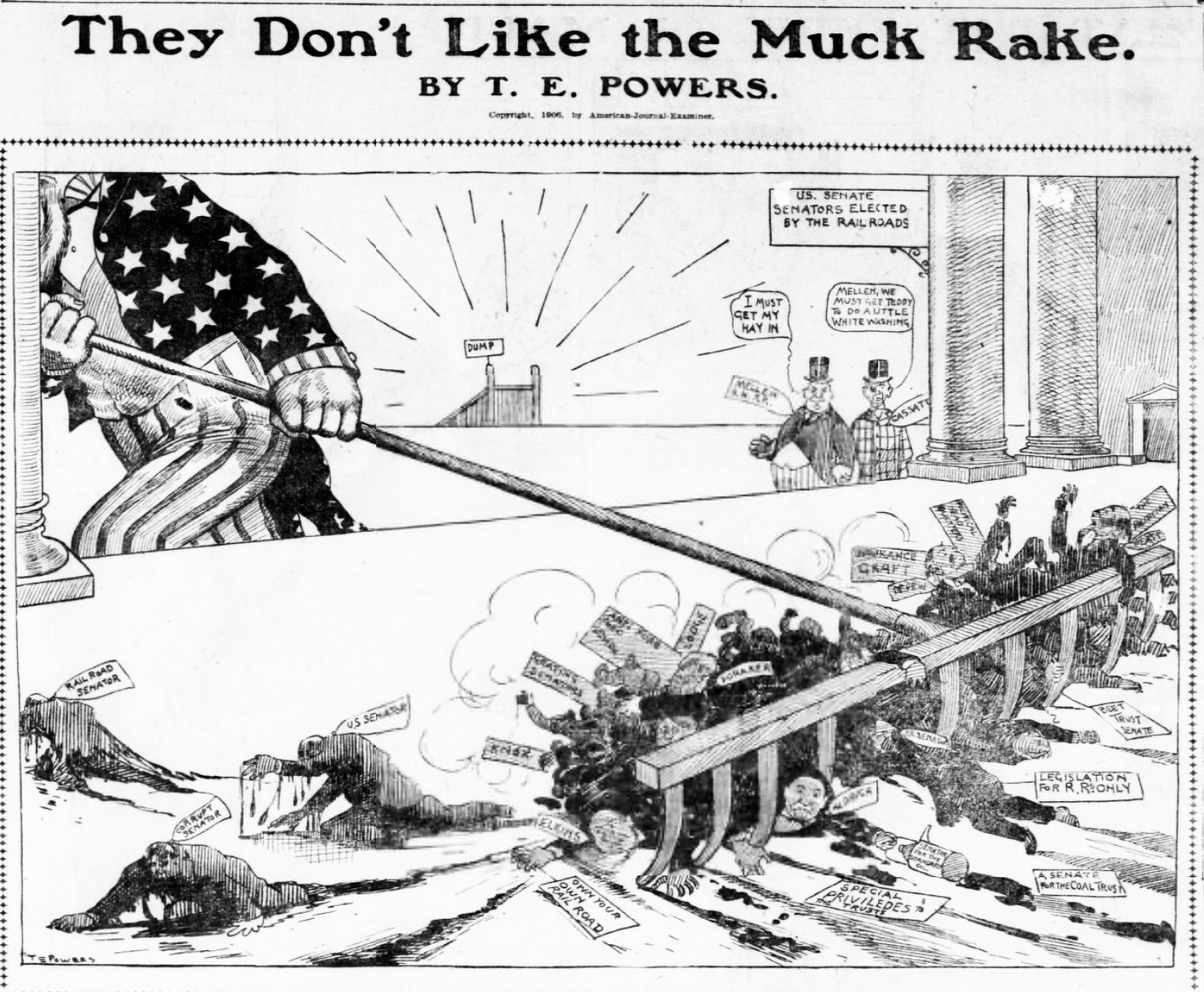
Powers' editorial drawing promoting the work of the muckrakers, 1906

Throughout Roosevelt's presidency, Powers and other Hearst staff artists regularly produced panels that championed or alluded to the president's efforts to advance his progressive policies domestically and to project internationally the United States' emerging military and economic power. His editorial drawings also illustrated the opinion columns of Hearst's reform-minded writers and reporters or "muckrakers", who sought to uncover and highlight corruption in both governmental offices and corporate boardrooms. In his 2007 book William Randolph Hearst: Final Edition, 1911-1951, historian Ben H. Proctor summarizes the objectives of the newspaper publisher's ongoing journalistic "crusade" and touches on Powers' part in promoting its ideals:

The Hearst crusade technique, which advocated "moral and progressive thought in the community", appeared daily. Editorials and pronouncements, coupled with political cartoons by such talented artists as Frederick Opper, Winsor McCay, and T. E. Powers, crusaded for such important local and national issues as municipal subways, public school reforms, a fair and judicial enforcement of laws by city and state officials, food safety and public health issues, women's suffrage, child labor laws, an aggressive foreign policy by the United States, and the expansion and modernization of the nation's naval fleet.

==== "The Political Round-Up", 1913 ====
T. E. Powers also drew illustrations for other Hearst publications outside the corporation's growing newspaper division. During the latter half of 1913, he provided all the editorial cartoons for "The Political Round-Up" section of Hearst's Magazine. That section in the monthly periodical features essays that comment on notable personalities and events at the forefront of discussions in American political circles. In the magazine's July issue that year, Powers' drawings complement texts covering voting rights, including women's suffrage; the "tariff wars" being debated in D.C. in the summer of 1913; the blatant excesses of "pork-barrelism" by both the Democratic and Republican parties; and the alleged diplomatic overreach by William Jennings Bryant, who at the time was secretary of state in President Woodrow Wilson's administration.

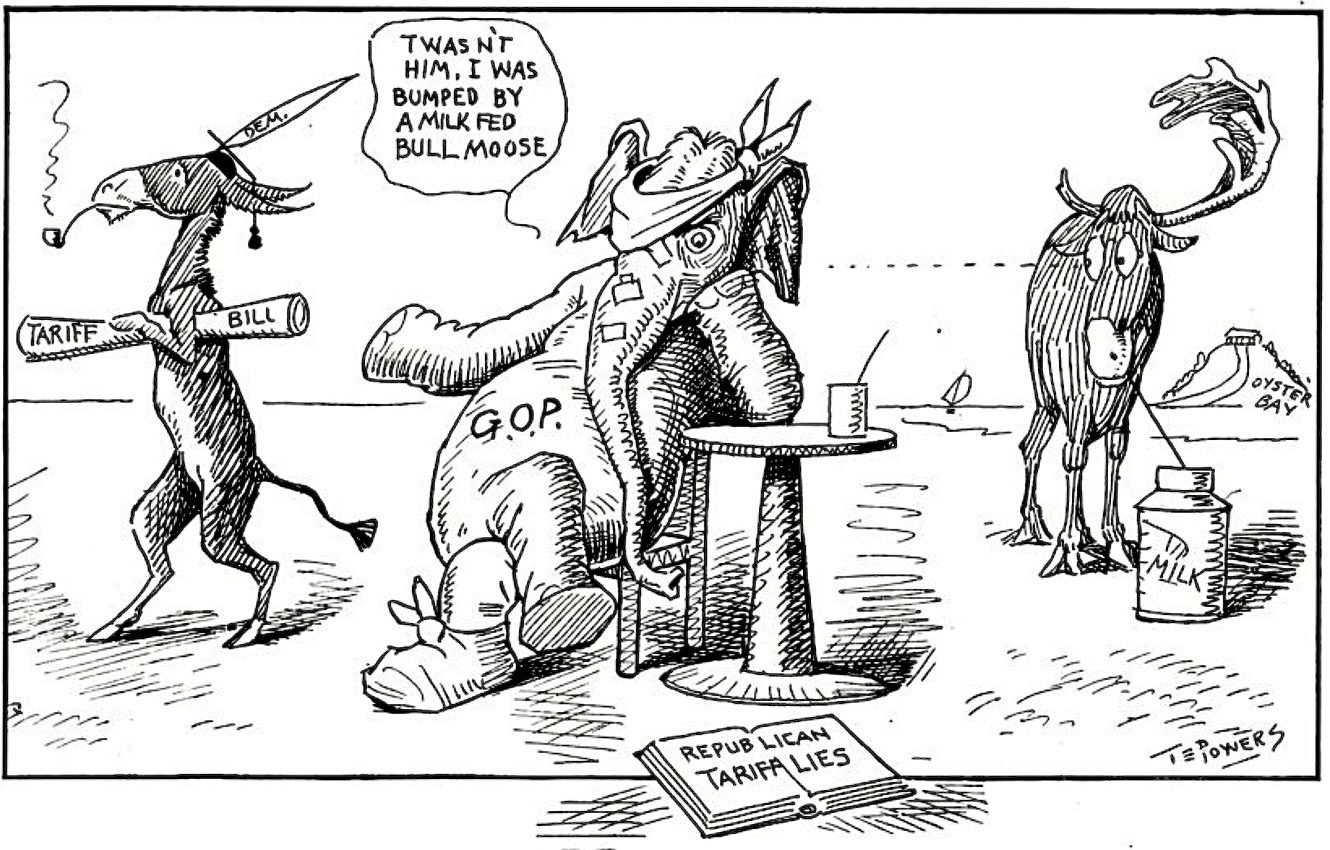
Powers portrays the battered Republican elephant and moose of the Bull Moose Party after the Democratic donkey's victory on the Tariff Bill of 1913.

When compared to T. E.'s comic strips and to his earlier caricatures and political drawings in newspapers, Powers' editorial cartoons in Hearst's Magazine appear to show greater attention to line, detail, and composition. The magazine's July 1913 issue includes, for example, Powers' editorial cartoon subtitled "Republican Tariff Lies", which shows three anthropomorphic animals representing the three principal political parties at the time: the Democrats' donkey smokes a tobacco pipe while confidently strolling away from the scene and carrying a scroll marked "Tariff Bill"; the Republicans' elephant–his left foot, trunk, and right eye bandaged–sits in a chair in a battle-weary pose, resting his front-left leg on a table; and a milk-fed moose, representing Theodore Roosevelt's Bull Moose Party and missing its entire right antler, stares at the departing donkey with a "shell-shocked" expression. Far away in the background there is a house on a hill with the label "Oyster Bay". This is a visual reference to Roosevelt's private home in New York, Sagamore Hill, which is situated along the north shore of Long Island near Oyster Bay. In this cartoon, Powers not only captured the dynamics of the pro- and anti-tariff debates in the U.S. Congress in 1913, he also captured the realities of the nation's political climate and landscape in the aftermath of the previous year's presidential campaign, which saw a Democrat reoccupy the White House. For the newspaper readers in 1913 who did not appreciate all the subtleties in the adjacent drawing, Powers added a typewritten caption beneath the panel that reads, "If Mr. Wilson would have his own and his party's days long in the land which the gods of politics have given them, he must not forget that the Democrats didn't win the election; the Republicans lost it."

== Powers continues with Hearst, 1914-1937 ==
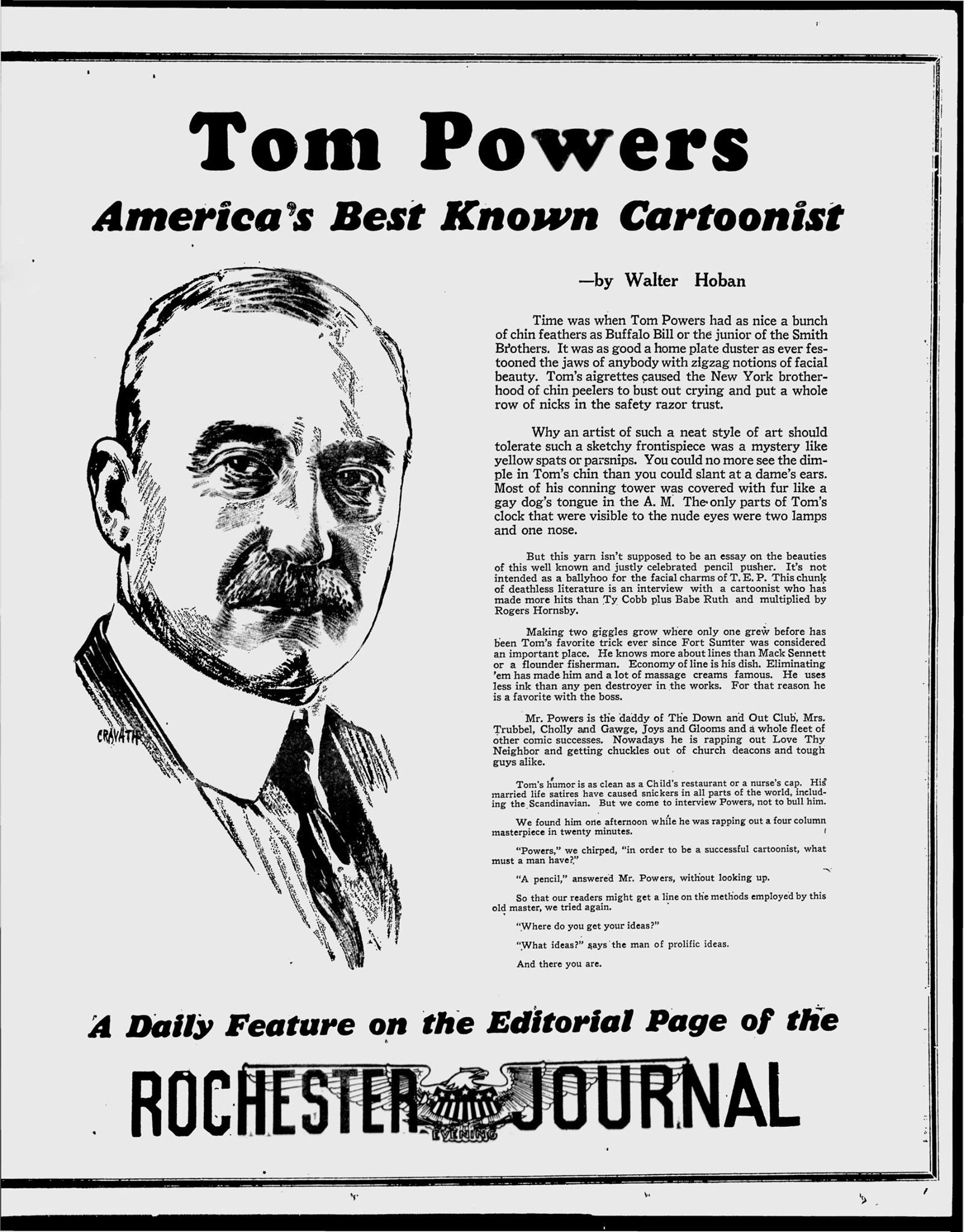
Promotion of Powers in Rochester Journal (New York), 1928

After over two decades working as a professional cartoonist, T. E. Powers spent the final half of his career continuing to produce many thousands of drawings for comic strips, editorial columns, and news stories in Hearst publications and for reprintings in the ever-growing number of independent newspapers subscribing to Hearst content. As a body of work, his single-panel cartoons and their messaging on a range of issues provide insight into a cartoon journalist's influence on and reactions to American public opinion. His drawings also continued for the next 23 years to be a mix, often subtly, of seriousness and wry humor. That humor is succinctly demonstrated in a transcription of an interview conducted with Powers in 1928. When the reporter posing questions asked him what a person needed "'in order to be a successful cartoonist'", Powers replied, "'A pencil.'"

=== Animated shorts ===
By 1915, Powers' characters—including Joy and Gloom—remained so popular with the general public that they started to appear in an entirely different medium outside the pages of newspapers and magazines. Beginning in December that year, Powers' original pen-and-ink creations were brought to "life" in animated shorts presented semi-weekly to movie theater audiences as entertaining additions to Hearst newsreels. The cartoons, with varying run times less than three minutes, were developed by the International Film Service (IFS), an animation studio established by the Hearst Corporation earlier in 1915. (Note: While many sources cite 1916 as the year Hearst established his International Film Service, Hearst Communication's website in 2026 confirms that IFS was founded in 1915. The entry for 1915 in the timeline "A Brief History of Hearst" on the site reads, "Hearst’s International Film Service is formed. Among the pioneer animation studios, the company made movie stars out of characters from Hearst newspaper comic strips, including “Bringing Up Father,” “Happy Hooligan,” “Maud the Mule,” “Krazy Kat” and more." See Hearst Communications.) In staffing the new service, as in the past for his newspapers, Hearst lured top talent away from other companies with more lucrative salaries, in this case hiring experienced artists like Gregory LaCava, Bill Nolan, and Frank Moser away from their jobs at the studio of animation pioneer Raoul Barré.

One of the 1916 animated shorts adapted from Powers' drawings and featuring Joy and Gloom

After the depletion of his studio staff by Hearst, Raoul Barré found it necessary to accept, at least for a short time, contracted animation work or "'farmed out'" projects from IFS. Barré and his cartoonists, under La Cava's direction and Powers' supervision, produced a series of eight Hearst-Vitagraph newsreel cartoons based solely on the "Phables" comic strip characters created by Powers. That series, according to film historian Leonard Maltin in his 1980 volume Of Mice and Magic: A History of American Animation, replicated faithfully the "stylishly simple fashion" of Powers' drawings as well as the newspaper cartoonist's "impish sense of humor". The first of Barré's Hearst-Vitagraph newsreel cartoons, one currently considered to be lost, was The Phable of Sam and Bill, which was released by IFS on December 17, 1915. Two weeks later, on December 31, Feet Is Feet: A Phable premiered, while the remaining animated shorts by Barré were all released during the early months of 1916. Their titles are as follows: The Phable of a Busted Romance, The Phable of the Phat Woman, Mr. Nobody Holme–He Buys a Jitney, Never Again! The Story of a Speeder Cop, A Newlywed Phable, and Cooks vs. Chefs: The Phable of Olaf and Louie.

Four weeks after the release of Barré's first Powers-inspired cartoon, the American film-industry magazine Motion Picture News announced the animated series in its January 15, 1916 issue. In the article titled "Cartoonist Powers to Draw for Hearst-Vitagraph", the periodical provides examples of what cartoon characters theatergoers could expect to see in upcoming newsreels:

TOM POWERS, the cartoonist, is presented as one of the main features of the Hearst-Vitagraph News Pictorial. "Joys" and "Glooms," which have appeared in the Hearst newspapers, will scamper across the screen as a part of the Hearst-Vitagraph semi-weekly news film. "Mrs. Trubbel" [sic] will continue to stir up domestic discord, but in thousands of theatres, in addition to the columns of the Hearst papers. "Powers' Phables" will bring in motion on the screen the weaknesses of human nature. "Never Again!" the "Down and Out Club" and "Charlie and George" will be other features to be seen in motion from the pen of Powers.

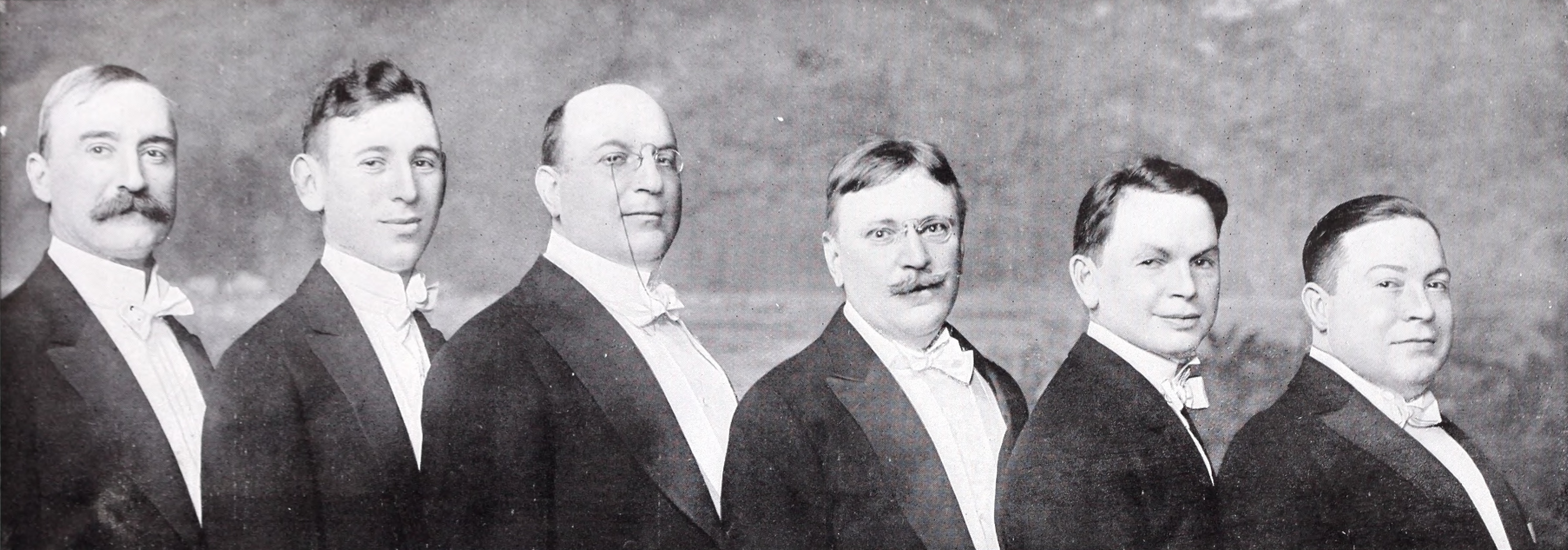
Powers (left) with fellow American cartoonists in 1915: Rube Goldberg, Henry Mayer, Richard Outcault, Clare A. Briggs, George McManus

Throughout the rest of 1916 and 1917, IFS continued to produce either in-house or contract with outside animators more newsreel cartoons based on Powers' characters and on comic strips drawn by some other Hearst artists, such as the series Bringing Up Father by George McManus, Happy Hooligan by Frederick Opper, and Krazy Kat by George Herriman. Later financial problems facing IFS forced Hearst in 1918 to reorganize his expanding newspaper and wire services, including the establishment of the International Newsreel Corporation (INC) under the management of E. B. Hatrick. Hearst's new entity continued to arrange licensing agreements and the production of additional "amusement films", including the resumption of animated cartoons featuring Powers' characters Joy and Gloom. To "serve as an amusing conclusion of the news events of the day", the first new Joys and Glooms cartoon was on the Hearst newsreel distributed to theaters by Universal Pictures on November 3, 1921. Their appearances in Hearst newsreels continued into 1922, often alternating in release dates with cartoons based on the comic-strip series Indoor Sports and Outdoor Sports by Tad Dorgan, one of Powers' fellow cartoonists at the Journal and the American.

=== War, women's suffrage, and the "Raw Deal" ===
Many momentous events occurred internationally and nationally between 1914 and Powers' retirement in 1937. Some of them dramatically affected the course of the United States' development in the short term; others, for generations to come. Overall, Powers' editorial drawings in this period and those of his colleagues on the Journal and the American remained reflective of the priorities of William Hearst's thinking on such important issues as the war in Europe, the Nineteenth Amendment, and the federal policies of President Franklin Roosevelt's "New Deal" during the Great Depression in the 1930s.

==== World War I ====
The titanic military struggle ignited by an assassin's bullet in Europe in 1914 quickly enveloped the entire continent and affected nation states around the globe. The brutal battles of World War I and the severe economic, political, and social upheavals caused by the international conflict dominated press coverage well beyond the armistice in November 1918, including the news headlines and editorial pages of Hearst's newspapers. Prior to the United States' formal entry into the war in April 1917, his publications generally opposed America's involvement in what Hearst viewed as exclusively a European concern, promoting instead the idea that the United States should remain a neutral party and not enter into "entangling alliances" with either the Allies or the Germany-led Central Powers. Harboring a great distrust for Great Britain's and France's self-interests and the veracity of their wartime propaganda, Hearst opinion columns and editorial cartoons professed an "America First" position in the early stages of the conflict, although it was a position that often had a decidedly pro-German slant.

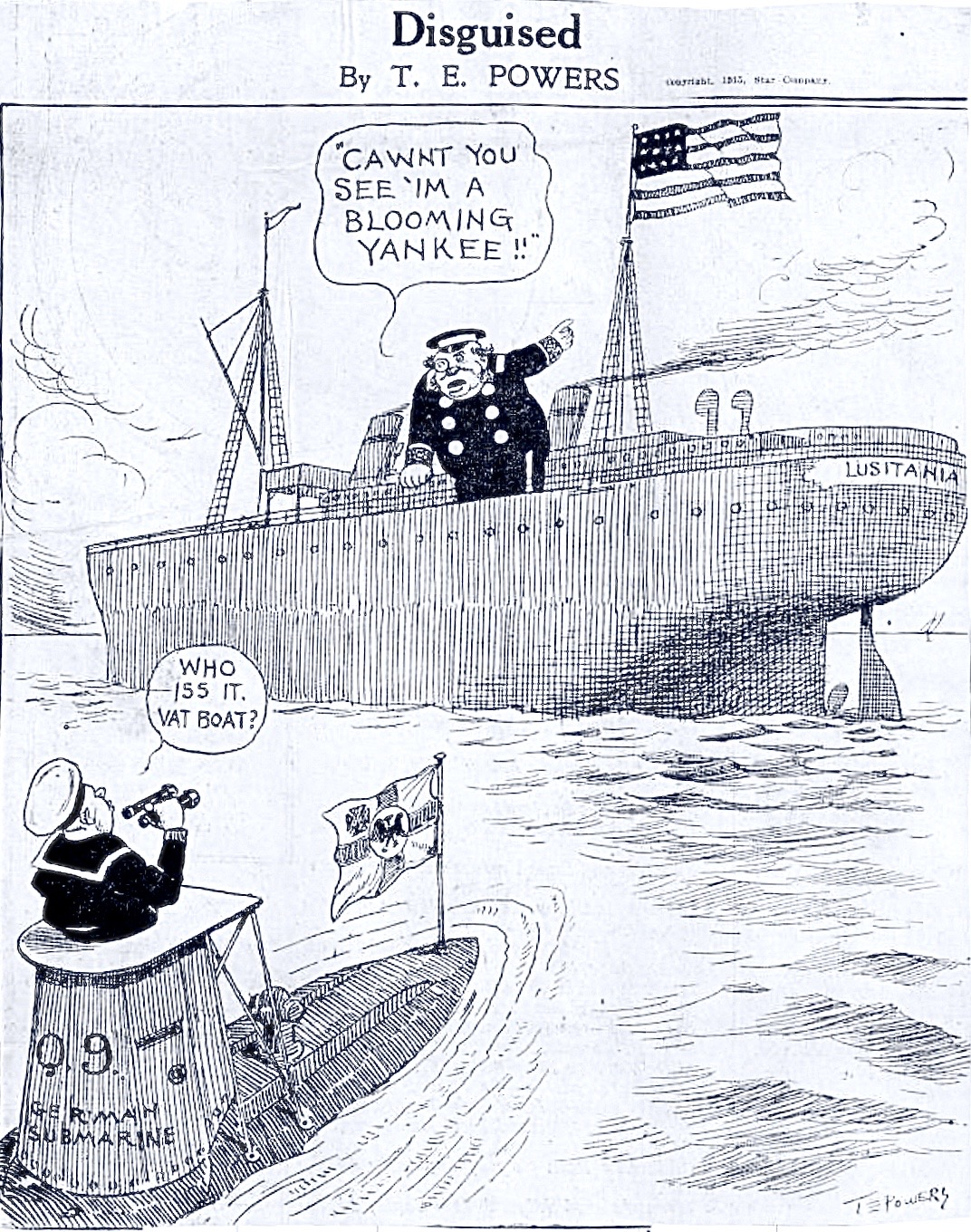
Powers' view of the flag-flying incident three months prior to the Lusitania being sunk on May 7, 1915

Under a licensing agreement with the Hearst Corporation, the New York Tribune was another newspaper that was able to reprint drawings by Powers, including one published on February 10, 1915 that epitomizes William Hearst's suspicions concerning Britain's early anti-German propaganda and the maritime tactics employed by some British ships to avoid being targeted by German submarines or "U-boats". Among the chain of events leading up to the United States declaring war on Germany in 1917 was the sinking of the British ocean liner RMS Lusitania off the coast of Ireland on May 7, 1915. Powers' editorial cartoon was published three months prior to the ship's destruction by a German torpedo, a disaster that would kill 1,195 people, including 123 Americans. His cartoon depicts a reported incident at sea involving the Lusitania flying the American flag. That incident and subsequent investigations by the U.S. State Department prompted Secretary of State William Jennings Bryan to dispatch a telegram to London expressing Washington's "grave concern" that the Lusitania and other British vessels, acting upon instructions from their government, had flown the "neutral" flag of the United States rather the Red Ensign of the United Kingdom as required by maritime law.

Powers' cartoon of this international incident portrays the Lusitania stopped at sea near a surfaced U-boat. Titled "Disguised", the drawing also shows the ocean liner flying a large American flag and the ship's British captain shouting at a confused but wary crewman aboard a German submarine. In a dialogue bubble above his head, the crewman, who is holding binoculars, asks the ship's captain in broken English and with eye dialect to simulate a German accent, "Who Iss It. Vat boat?" The captain, pointing up to the American flag at the top of his liner's aft mast, responds, with Powers again using non-standard spelling and punctuation to convey a British accent, "'Cawnt You See `Im A Blooming Yankee!!'".

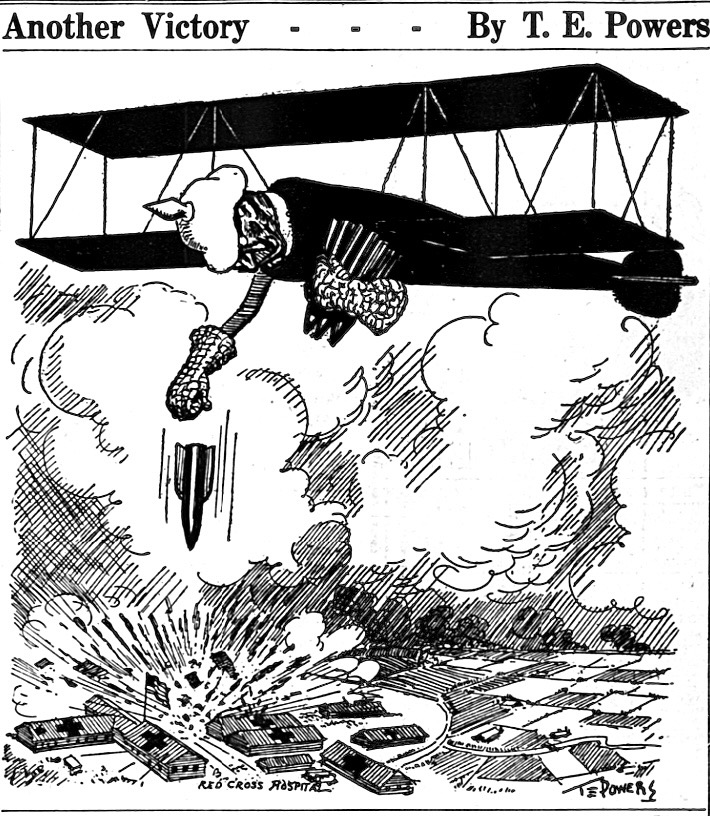
Anti-German editorial cartoon depicting enemy pilot dropping bombs on American Red Cross hospital, September 1917

Despite the United States' reluctance to commit militarily to the war, the sinking of the Lusitania and a series of other international incidents and controversies from the latter half of 1915 until early 1917 began increasingly to sway American public opinion against Germany and its autocratic kaiser, Wilhelm II. Once America finally declared war on the Imperial German Government in April 1917 and entered the conflict on the side of the Allies, Hearst and his staff of newspaper editors, columnists, and cartoonists ardently supported the nation's war effort. To that end, T. E. Powers produced a wide assortment of anti-German drawings and American patriotic images for publication.

The following are descriptions of two of the many patriotic themes that Powers used during the war for his editorial cartoons. One drawing from January 1918 is titled "On the Job" that depicts a colossal American soldier, a "doughboy" with a shouldered rifle, marching ashore in France. Warmly greeting him with outstretched arms are two miniature figures representing French Marshal Joseph Joffre and Liberté, while on the horizon two other small caricatures of Kaiser Wilhelm II and German General Paul von Hindenburg observe the gigantic American's arrival with shock and dismay. The other drawing, titled "Pulling His Teeth: The Kaiser's New American Dentist", was published just three days before the ceasefire ending World War I. Powers shows Uncle Sam in a dentist's short lab coat and using a hefty pair of pliers labeled "Peace Terms" to pull out three of Wilhelm II's molars. One of the extracted teeth is inscribed "Militarism", another is marked "Submarines", and the last one, in partial German, reads "God punish America". The dialogue bubble above Uncle Sam's head reads, "They Had To Come Out Bill."

==== The Nineteenth Amendment, 1920 ====
Within two years after the end of World War I, two important additions were made in close succession to the United States Constitution. The mandates of one of those additions–the Eighteenth Amendment prohibiting the production, transportation, and sale of alcoholic beverages–would officially end 14 years after its ratification in January 1919; the other remains in force to the present day. In August 1920, the required number of the nation's state legislaures approved and thereby ratified a proposal by the U.S. Congress for the Nineteenth Amendment, prohibiting the denial of the right to vote to citizens on the basis of sex. In effect, this amendment extended the right to vote to women nationally. It was a right that William Hearst had long supported personally and, as part of his broader progressive agenda, had advocated for since 1899 in many pro-suffrage articles and editorials published in the Journal and in his other newspapers. Hearst's own views on the issue of women's rights and the evolution of his social and political activism had been heavily influenced and encouraged by his mother Phoebe Apperson Hearst, who was widely recognized for her philanthropy and for early work on behalf of women's suffrage.

T. E. Powers, for his part in representing Hearst publications' support for women voting, drew many editorial panels and comic strips over the years that promoted suffrage and stirred recurring debates on the issue. A decade before the passage of the Nineteenth Amendment, the cartoonist created Yosobel the Suffragette, a comic-strip series that kept the expansion of the nation's voting population in the minds of millions of newspaper readers. The character Ysobel is depicted by Powers as a physically beautiful and engaging young woman, who is fashionably dressed, poised, and thoroughly dedicated to enticing and converting misguided and impressionable men of all ages to join the "cause".

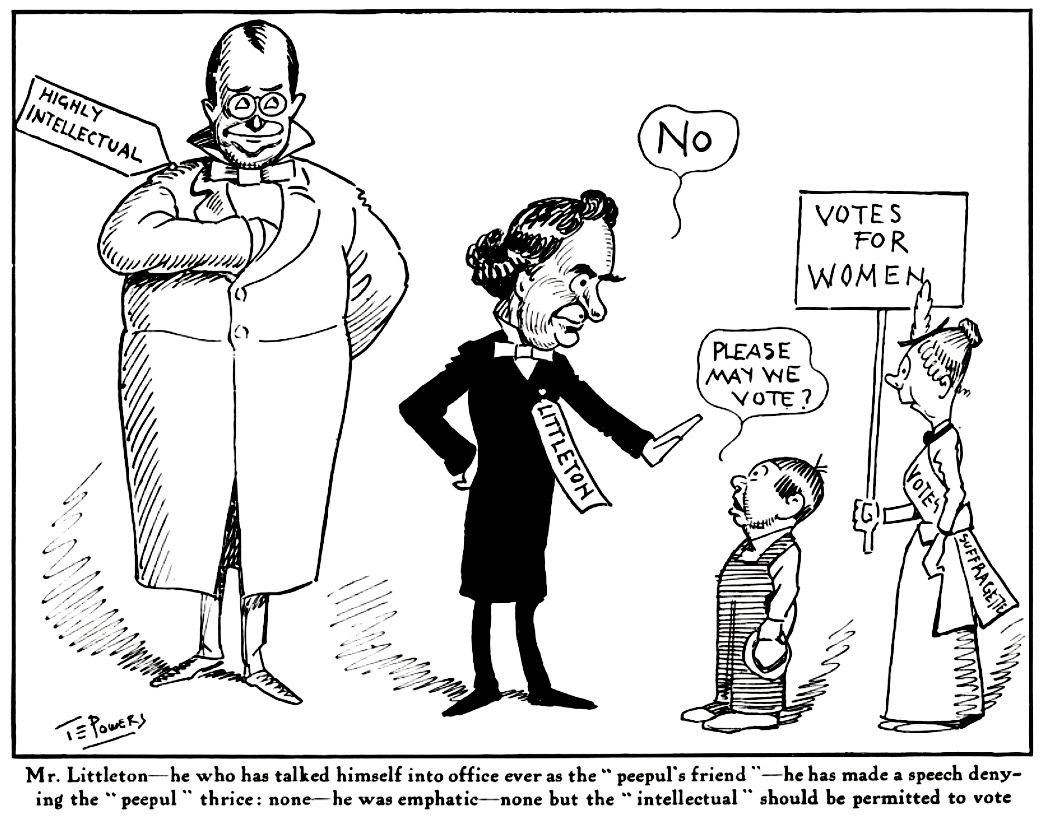
One of Powers many cartoons promoting women's suffrage, 1913

Among Powers' pro-suffrage editorial cartoons is one he penned seven years before the ratification of the Nineteenth Amendment. The single-panel drawing in the July 1913 issue of Hearst's Magazine was intended as a counterpunch to a "most unfortunate speech" made recently in Boston by Martin W. Littleton, the Democratic U.S. Representative from New York's 1st congressional district. Opposed to the extension of voting rights to women through a federal constitutional amendment, Littleton was skeptical of universal suffrage, of having mass democracy until the population as a whole was better educated, insisting that ideally "none save the 'intellectual' should be permitted to vote". The magazine's opinion section, "The Political Roundup", denounced that idea and others expressed by Littleton as being "sixteenth, not twentieth century sentiments" and that the congressman "should have avoided giving them voice". Emphasizing those points, Powers' cartoon accompanying the editorial shows a large caricature of Littleton literally talking down to two befuddled figures: a small man, hat in hand, wearing the bib-and-brace overalls of a common laborer; and a prim older woman holding a "Votes For Women" sign and wearing a sash printed with "Votes Suffragettes". The small man, with a dialogue balloon above his head, asks Littleton, "Please May We Vote?" To which the congressman simply replies, "No". Behind Littleton and observing the conversation is a towering, well-dressed man striking a Napoleonic pose and identified with a tag labeled "Highly Intellectual".

==== The "Raw Deal", 1930s ====
William Hearst strongly opposed many of the "New Deal" economic, political and social reforms established and advanced by Franklin D. Roosevelt's administration during the Great Depression in the United States. Initially, Hearst supported and promoted Roosevelt in his 1932 presidential campaign, but soon after FDR occupied the Oval Office, Hearst became one of the fiercest critics of the new president's policies. Reviewing the content of the editorial cartoons by T. E Powers and his fellow artists with Hearst's newspapers in the 1930s provides one means of tracking and literally illustrating their employer's philosophical shift from his zealous social progressivism at the turn of the century to far more conservative positions by the early 1930s. Hearst viewed the increasing concentration of power at the federal level and the policies of FDR's New Deal programs as being direct threats to the long-term survival of the nation's basic economic structure and its democratic foundations. Of particular concern to Hearst were the government's expanding taxation policies, which he deemed a "bastard product of Communism" under the guidance of "Stalin Delano Roosevelt".

Drawings produced by Powers' during the Depression, as expected, remained in line with the opinions and directives of William Hearst, who began instructing his editors and staff of cartoonists to begin using the terms "Raw Deal" in place of "New Deal" in their opinion columns and on related drawings. One of Powers' pen-and-ink commentaries criticizing federal taxation policies and the massive outlays on government jobs programs was published in Hearst newspapers on various dates in October 1934 and incorporates the noted change in terminology. The cartoon, titled "Busy Bees–Raw Deal for The Bees", presents a swarm of honey bees flying back to their huge, dome-shaped hive, which is its overall appearance resembles the United States Capitol. Each bee is labeled "Tax Payer" and carries money in its forelegs. Far below, on the ground, are entrances on every side of the hive. Above the front entrance are the words "U.S. Government", "Come And Get It!", and "$ The Pay Off $". Funneling into all the entrances are long, winding lines of people who are identified by various signs labeled "Govt. Employees", "Army of Govt. Job Holders", "An Army On The Pay Rolls", "Government Men", and "City Job Holders".

In another example of his many Depression-era cartoons, one from July 1935 and titled "A Big Job for Little New Dealers", Powers shows three professors dressed in their full academic regalia positioned around a very large tree. On its trunk is printed "The Constitution of the United States". The men in the scene represent FDR's "brain trust", which was composed largely of academic professionals who assisted the Roosevelt Administration in formulating its economic and social policies. They appear focused on the tree and determined to topple it. One of the professors holds a scroll marked "New Deal". Beside him stands another academic, who grips the handle of an ax labeled "Congress". The third professor, also armed with an axe, has already begun to chop down the tree.

== Retirement and personal life ==
By the mid-1930s, after decades of drawing thousands upon thousands of images for publication, Powers began to curtail his work substantially due to failing health. He finally retired from the Hearst Corporation in 1937 and retreated to his primary New York residence located on Long Island, in Long Beach. There he continued to produce an occasional cartoon until September the following year.

Powers married only once, in 1895, to Louise Hyde, a native of Stafford, Connecticut. (Note: The spelling of Louise's name varies in some records, at times being cited "Louisa", such as in the United States Census of 1900 for Manhattan, New York.) Subsequent federal census records and the cartoonist's obituaries indicate that the couple had no children, and that during their 44-year marriage the Powers resided at various locations in New York as well as in Connecticut. While they resided in New York City during the early years of their marriage, T. E. and Louise by 1910 had moved to Norwalk, Connecticut, to a farm situated approximately 50 miles northeast of downtown Manhattan. There Powers continued to produce his drawings and send them to the city for printing and release. The rural atmosphere of Connecticut provided the cartoonist with welcomed distractions and relief from his relentless publication schedules. The New York Herald Tribune later quoted Powers' comments about the personal enjoyment he derived from living in Norwalk, along with his awareness that he was also providing veteran farmers in the area with amusement as they watched him "work the soil":

"My favorite recreation is farming. It's the best kind of sport in the world and is real fun, not only for myself but for the neighbors as well. They seem greatly amused. I don't know why but that's the status of the situation."

The couple maintained their Connecticut farm for another two decades, even after they later purchased another house in Long Beach, New York, the same property where T. E. would spend his final months in retirement.

=== Landscape artist ===
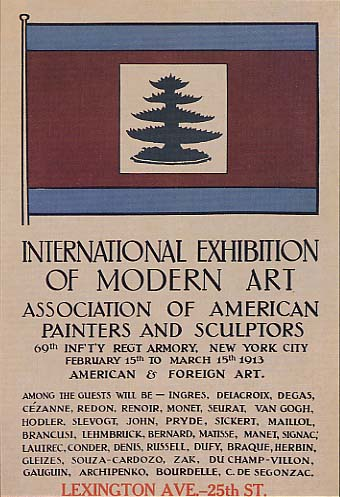
Armory Show poster, New York City, 1913

Cartoons and caricatures were not Powers only interests artistically. He was also an accomplished oil painter, particularly of landscapes and maritime-related scenes. Over the years his works were accepted for display in both national and international exhibitions, including the prestigious International Exhibition of Modern Art, which was presented in New York City from February 17 to March 15, 1913. Also known as the "Armory Show", the event opened "informally" on February 15 on Lexington Avenue, between Twenty-fifth and Twenty-sixth streets, and showcased 1,500 contemporary works by American painters and sculptors as well as 400 pieces by European masters in those same branches of the visual arts. The New York Times in its coverage of the extensive exhibition lists "T. E. Powers" among the painters selected by the "committee of domestic art" to present their works. A few of the other American artists represented at the Armory Show were Max Weber, Kathleen McEnery, Albert P. Ryder, Philip Hale, Leon Dabo, and George Bellows. Two of Powers' landscapes were selected by the committee for display and are listed in the show's catalog as entry numbers 968 and 969. A supplement to the catalog later documents that Powers' two paintings were actually not displayed due to their not being delivered to the Armory.

With few exceptions during his career, Powers consistently signed his pen-and-ink creations with "T", followed by three horizontal bars symbolizing "E", and followed then his surname. His paintings, on the other hand, are consistently signed at the lower-right corner of his canvases in all capital letters “TOM POWERS". Periodically, original drawings and oil-on-canvas works by Powers still become available through various concerns such as Heritage Auctions and Eldred's Auction House, which in the past have sold on consignment some of Powers' paintings and pen-and-ink works. (Note: Some additional information about T. E. Powers' paintings and drawings can be gleaned from company websites that specialize in tracking sales of artworks, storing images of purchased pieces, and gathering basic information about the artists. Two such concerns are MutualArt.com and askART.)

== Death ==
By early 1939, Powers had quit drawing entirely and spent his days confined to a wheelchair when not in bed. Then on the morning of August 14, 1939—after battling what Powers' obituaries describe as a "two-year illness"—he died at home in his sleep. Obituaries also report that his butler and caretaker, Nicholas Russell, found the retired artist dead in bed. After a brief memorial service, Powers' body was cremated at the New York and New Jersey Crematory in Union City, New Jersey. He was survived by his wife Louise, two brothers, and his sister. Louise continued to reside in New York City until her death in the Bronx on December 27, 1944.

== Preservation of Powers' work ==
It is estimated that Powers produced more than 15,000 drawings for publication during his long career. Many of those works survive in printed form in numerous period newspapers, journals, and magazines preserved in their original formats in library archives or in digital form in online references. Thousands of Powers' comic strips and editorial cartoons can be examined over decades through the open-access online database Chronicling America: Historic American Newspapers hosted by the Library of Congress (LC). In the LC's Prints and Photographs Division, among the holdings of The Caroline and Erwin Swann Collection of Caricature & Cartoon, over a dozen of Powers' original drawings for his editorial cartoons are also preserved. Drawn with India ink over pencil onto Bristol boards, some of those originals contain the cartoonist's own notations along the boards' margins. One of the most elaborate drawings, drawn between 1913 and 1914 and cataloged in the Swann Collection as the "[Banquet Scene]", is described as follows: "Men and animals gather at banquet tables in a hall labeled 'Down & Outs.' They are political losers associated with incompetence, corruption, scandal, and electoral defeat, about to feast on crow."

=== The Billy Ireland Cartoon Library & Museum ===
At Ohio State University in Columbus, Ohio, the Billy Ireland Cartoon Library & Museum contains, according to the university's website, "the world's largest collection of materials related to cartoons and comics, including original art, books, magazines, journals, comic books, graphic novels, archival materials, and newspaper comic strip pages and clippings." As part of their extensive collections, this specialized library and museum hold some original works by T. E. Powers, along with many copies of publications from the late 1890s and early decades of the twentieth century that feature his drawings. Some of Powers' work in the Ireland Library and Museum collections include examples of his comic strips, original random drawings, and a highly stylized Art Nouveau poster created by Powers to use as cover art for the August 1896 issue M'lle New York Magazine. The poster, minimalist in its composition, depicts a woman standing in the dark and reading pages by candlelight while on the floor a cat, appearing to be fightened, peers up at her.
