= Hearst-Vitagraph News Pictorial =

PLAY "Krazy Kat - Bugologist", a cartoon featured as extra content on a 1916 Hearst-Vitagraph newsreel; character by George Herriman with animation by Frank Moser; runtime 00:03:24.

The Hearst-Vitagraph News Pictorial or Hearst-Vita graph (also known as the Hearst-Vitagraph News Reel) was a short-lived company producing newsreels which were coupled with animated cartoons. It was established on 29 October 1915 by the Brooklyn-based Vitagraph Studios and the Hearst Corporation, and produced its first reel in February 1916, but folded in 1916. Previously, Hearst had produced newsreels together with the Selig Polyscope Company from 1914 on, and after the deal with Vitagraph ended Hearst teamed up with Pathé.

PLAY another 1916 Hearst-Vitagraph Krazy Kat cartoon short by Harriman with animation by Leon Searl; runtime 00:02:18.

The cartoons which were added to the newsreels were created by Hearst's animation studio International Film Service, led by Gregory La Cava, which converted popular comic strips from the Hearst newspapers to the big screen. Included in the News Pictorial were Parcel Post cartoons created by Frank Moser (who animated most of the other ones as well), George Herriman's Krazy Kat (at least eight shorts), And Her Name Was Maud and Happy Hooligan by Frederick Burr Opper, Daffydil and Judge Rummy by Tad Dorgan, The Katzenjammer Kids by Harold Knerr, Bringing Up Father by George McManus, Joys and Glooms by T. E. Powers, and Jerry on the Job by Walter Hoban.

The newsreels were created by a staff of about 56 cameramen, and produced a number of scoops, including images of the sinking of the British ship HMS Audacious in 1914, and the sinking of the German ship SMS Blücher in 1915.
