= The Twentieth Century Tramp; or, Happy Hooligan and His Airship =

1902 film by Edwin Stanton Porter

- Screenshot
- Happy Hooligan by Frederick Burr Opper
- Directed by: Edwin S. Porter
- Produced by: Edwin S. Porter
- Starring: James Stuart Blackton
- Production company: Edison Studios
- Distributed by: Edison Manufacturing Company
- Release date: January 1902
- Running time: One minute
- Country: United States
- Language: Silent

The Twentieth Century Tramp; or, Happy Hooligan and His Airship is an American silent short film produced and directed by Edwin S. Porter and released in 1902. This film is an adaptation of the cartoon Happy Hooligan, played by J. Stuart Blackton.

The Happy Hooligan films are a series of live-action comedy shorts which were produced from 1900–1902 by Edison Studios, and may be the first adaptation of American comics into film.

A series of several dozen animated shorts, which were produced by at least three different studios, from 1916–1921, were also based on the Happy Hooligan character.

== Plot ==
A Twentieth Century up-to-date tramp flying over the chimney tops of New York City in the latest flying machine, a bicycle that has its own propeller. The vagabond flies over the top of the Equitable Life building and other New York skyscrapers, then flies over the East River and clears the top of the Brooklyn Bridge.

In making his way toward Staten Island, his flying machine blows up, and the tramp falls off his perch. (Note: The film is extremely dark and hard to make out images from either split screen.)

== Cast ==
- J. Stuart Blackton as Happy Hooligan (Note: During the period of work at the Vitagraph Studios, J. Stuart Blackton ran the studio, as well as being involved in producing, directing, and writing its films. He even starred in some of his films, especially as the "Happy Hooligan" when he worked with Edwin S. Porter at Edison Studios.)

== Production ==
À la conquête de l'air (1901) was a short film by Ferdinand Zecca based on contemporary accounts of aviation developments. The film stars Zecca as the pilot of a fantastic flying machine, part airship, part bicycle. It was probably the first film to successfully use the split-screen technique. When it was released in the United States, À la conquête de l'air was an immediate success. Porter decided to duplicate the film, changing the landscape of Paris to that of New York.

Using the same technique that Zecca employed, who had filmed himself in his strange contraption suspended from the studio roof with the camera having half the frame blocked. Blackton played the part of the "Happy Hooligan" pedaling away in the sky. Porter then rewound the film and shot the New York city landscape in the previously blacked-out portion, creating a split-screen effect, albeit, leaving a distinctive line between the two scenes, unlike the "trick" Zecca had used, of a blended line. Each film ran for approximately one minute.

== Reception ==
Historians Douglas Alver Menville, R. Reginald and Mary Wickizer Burgess in Futurevisions: The New Golden Age of the Science Fiction Film (1985) described the film's impact. "... previous filmmakers had used the near future as a backdrop for their stories ... "

Aviation historian Michael Paris in From the Wright Brothers to Top Gun: Aviation, Nationalism, and Popular Cinema (1995) in assessing The Twentieth Century Tramp, wrote, "Thus began a three-way relationship between aviation, comics and cinema which would mature in the 1930s."

== See also ==
- Edwin S. Porter filmography
