= Krazy Kat Invalid =

Silent short animated film

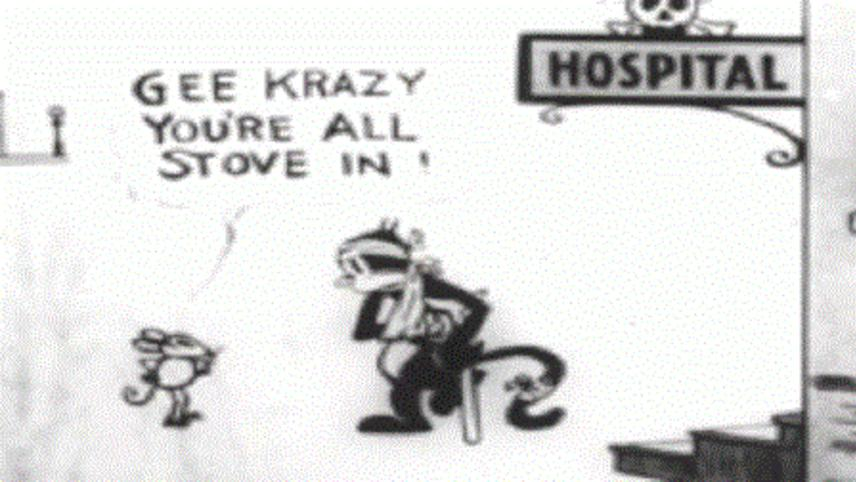
- Screenshot
- Produced by: William Randolph Hearst
- Animation by: Leon Searl
- Color process: Black and white
- Production company: International Film Service
- Distributed by: Hearst-Vitagraph News Pictorial
- Release date: March 27, 1916
- Running time: 2:21
- Language: English

Krazy Kat Invalid is a 1916 silent short animated film distributed by Hearst-Vitagraph News Pictorial, and featuring Krazy Kat in one of the character's earliest animated appearances.

In the film, an injured Krazy Kat narrates the tale of his recent car accident. He lost control of his car and found himself on a railroad track. His car was destroyed by a speeding train, but he survived and received care in a clinic.

== Plot ==
The short film

Krazy Kat exits a clinic, wrapped in some bandages and using a crutch. Momentarily he is greeted by a rat who knows him well. The rat asks what had happened to him. Krazy, answering in poor grammar, states he had a car accident. When the rat misinterprets his response as a locomotive accident, Krazy begins telling the story of the incident.

As Krazy explains his mishap, the scene is set several hours earlier. In it, Krazy comes out of his home and decides to drive around in his car. After traveling only a few miles, his car runs out of fuel. Instead of stopping at a gas station, Krazy stops at a bar. Instead of filling his vehicle with gas, he fills it with beer. Bizarrely, his car is running, but in a wild uncontrollable fashion. To the cat's horror, Krazy's car is running all over the place, even going underground, and breaking through a house. The out-of-control car next heads to a railroad track where a train is approaching. The train bashes the car to pieces, and Krazy is thrown upward before landing on some power lines.

The scene returns to the present where Krazy completes his explanation. Krazy goes on to tease and call the rat "smarty mice" for the misinterpretation. The rat takes offense to the remark and knocks out Krazy with his crutch.

== Home media ==
The short film was also released in 2004 in a DVD video compilation called George Herriman's Kinomatic Krazy Kat Kartoon Klassics.
