= Alphonse and Gaston =

Comic strip

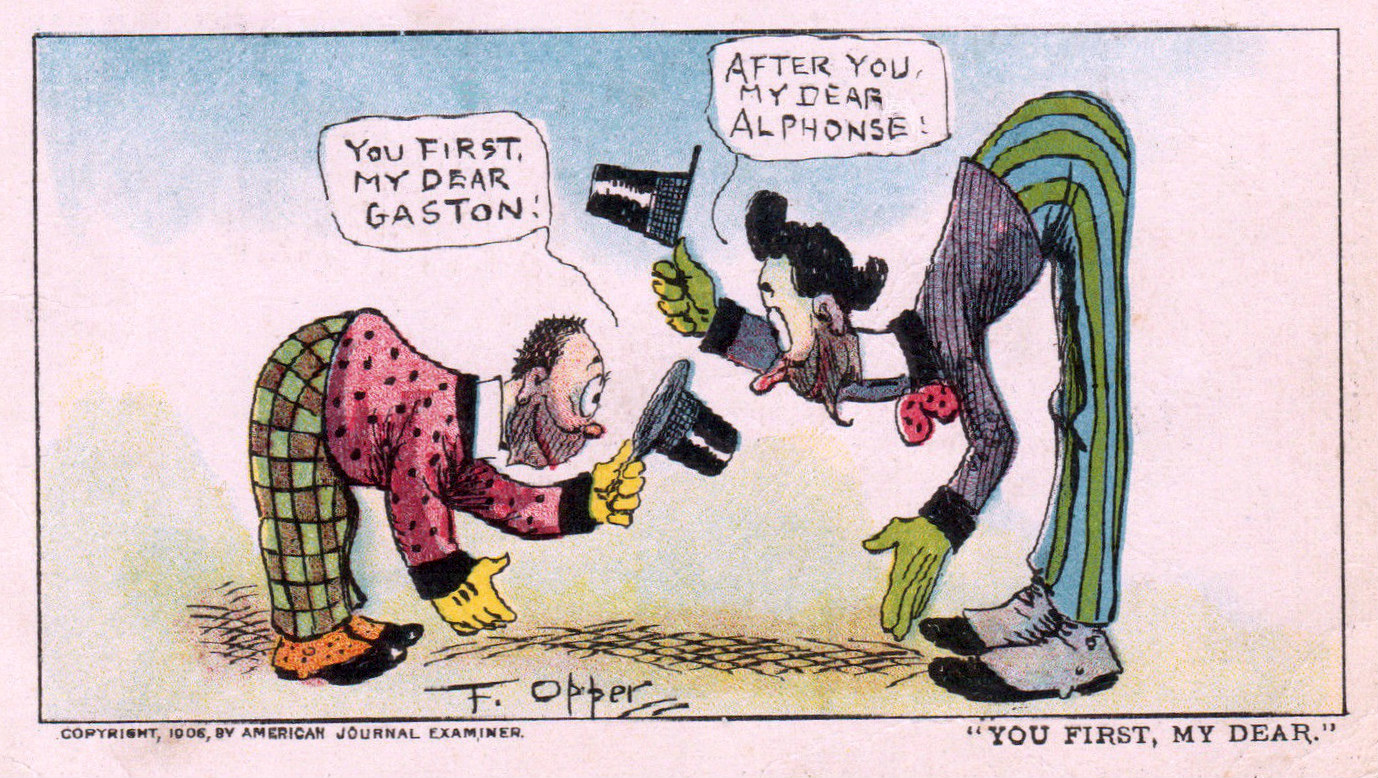
Frederick Burr Opper's Alphonse and Gaston (1906).

Alphonse and Gaston is an American comic strip by Frederick Burr Opper, featuring a bumbling pair of Frenchmen with a penchant for politeness. It first appeared in William Randolph Hearst's New York Journal on September 22, 1901, with the title "Alphonse a la Carte and His Friend Gaston de Table d'Hote". The strip was later distributed by King Features Syndicate.

== Characters and story ==
Their "'After you, Alphonse.', 'No, you first, my dear Gaston!'" routine ran for more than a decade. Alphonse is short; Gaston is tall. The premise is that both are extremely polite, constantly bowing and deferring to each other. Neither can ever do anything or go anywhere because each insists on letting the other precede him.

Though never a daily or even weekly feature, Alphonse and Gaston appeared on Sundays for several years. In addition to Hearst collections and licensed products, it was adapted into a stage play and several comedy shorts. In 1909, not-yet-famous director D.W. Griffith made a short (two-shot) split reel comedy for the Biograph company, featuring the characters, titled "The French Duel."

== Crossovers ==
A prolific artist and writer, Opper's other creations included Willie, Hans from Hamburg, Our Antediluvian Ancestors, And Her Name Was Maud and Happy Hooligan. The characters would occasionally make guest appearances outside their own strips. On one occasion, And Her Name Was Maud featured an appearance by Alphonse and Gaston aboard a runaway sleigh, each of them bowing to the other in the seat.

== Legacy ==
The strip faded from public view shortly after Opper's death in 1937, but the catchphrase "After you, my dear Alphonse" persisted.

The phrase "Alphonse-and-Gaston routine", or "Alphonse-Gaston Syndrome", indicates a situation wherein one party refuses to act until another party acts first. From a September 23, 2009, New York Times editorial: "For years, China and the United States have engaged in a dangerous Alphonse-and-Gaston routine, using each other's inaction to shirk their responsibility."

Alphonse and Gaston exchanges have also been employed by sportscasters during baseball broadcasts when two outfielders go after the ball and it falls in for a base hit. When two fielders allow a catchable ball to drop between them, it is known as "doing the Alphonse and Gaston."

The 1909 short farce-comedy Alphonse and Gaston by Frank Dumont is based around the characters.

The duo inspired the neologism "gastonette," coined by United States Circuit Judge Jon O. Newman in an opinion in In re McLean Industries Inc., 857 F.2d 88 (2d Cir. 1988): "We have no desire to consign the seamen to a jurisdictional limbo while the courts of two countries perform a gastonette, each awaiting a first move by the other."

The comic strip is referenced in Meyer Levin’s non-fiction novel Compulsion, and in Shirley Jackson's 1943 short story, After You, My Dear Alphonse.

== See also ==
- Goofy Gophers
