= And Her Name Was Maud =

American comic strip by Frederick Opper

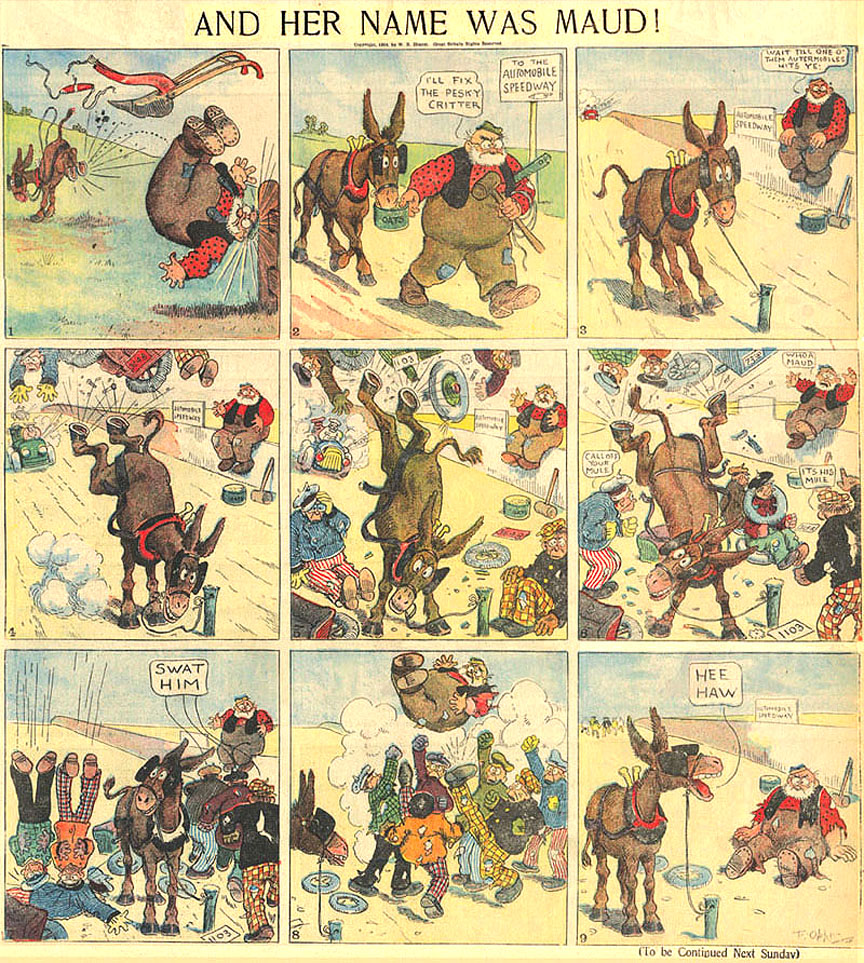
Frederick Burr Opper's And Her Name Was Maud (August 7, 1904)

And Her Name Was Maud is a comic strip by Frederick Burr Opper. It first appeared in the Hearst newspapers on July 24, 1904. After work as a magazine cartoonist, Opper was hired by Hearst in 1899 to draw comic strips for the New York Journal, launching Happy Hooligan, Alphonse and Gaston and And Her Name Was Maud.

== Characters and story ==
Maud was a revenge-seeking mule belonging to farmer Si Slocum and his wife Mirandy. Most of the action was a build-up to Maud kicking someone into the air. Si was the most frequent victim.

As was common in the early years of comic strips, the title under which Maud the Mule appeared might change from week to week. The character sometimes had crossover appearances in Opper's other strips, Happy Hooligan and Alphonse and Gaston. Maud was phased out in the 1910s, but reappeared from 1926 to the last appearance on October 14, 1932.

William Randolph Hearst produced a series of four silent "Maud the Mule" animated cartoons in 1916, directed by Gregory La Cava for International Film Service. The four titles are "Poor Si Keeler" (Feb 4), "A Quiet Day in the Country" (June 5), "Maud the Educated Mule" (July 3) and "Round and Round Again" (Oct 2).

== Exhibition ==
A century after it was created by Opper, And Her Name Was Maud was included in an exhibition at Ohio State University. This exhibit, Ohio Cartoonists: A Bicentennial Celebration, was mounted during the summer and early fall of 2003 at two venues, the Philip Sills Exhibit Hall, William Oxley Thompson Memorial Library and the Reading Room Gallery of Ohio State's Cartoon Research Library. It included work by Opper, Edwina Dumm, Richard F. Outcault and many of the cartoonists who took Charles N. Landon's Cleveland-based correspondence course and were hired by Landon to create cartoon features for Newspaper Enterprise Association.

== Maud the Mule in folk art ==
The Allen Bluff Mule

The "Allen Bluff Mule" is a painting of a mule on a limestone bluff on U.S. Route 70 in Liberty, Tennessee. Some residents say a local man named Lavader Woodard painted the mule; other residents contend that it was painted as an advertisement of a local stock farm. Dr. Wayne T. Robinson has claimed to be the original painter of the Liberty Mule:

"In early October 1906, I climbed up the face of the Allen Bluff to a ledge and with some coal tar made a flat picture of a character from a famous comic strip of that day. Everybody remembers Maud, the mule. That was 51 years ago, and even though it has been exposed to the elements and to nearby earth-shaking explosions, erosion has dimmed it very little." By this account, Dr. Robinson painted the original mule while a 21-year-old college student inspired by Maud the Mule, from the Frederick Burr Opper comic strip And Her Name Was Maud.
