= Happy Hooligan =

1900-1932 American comic strip

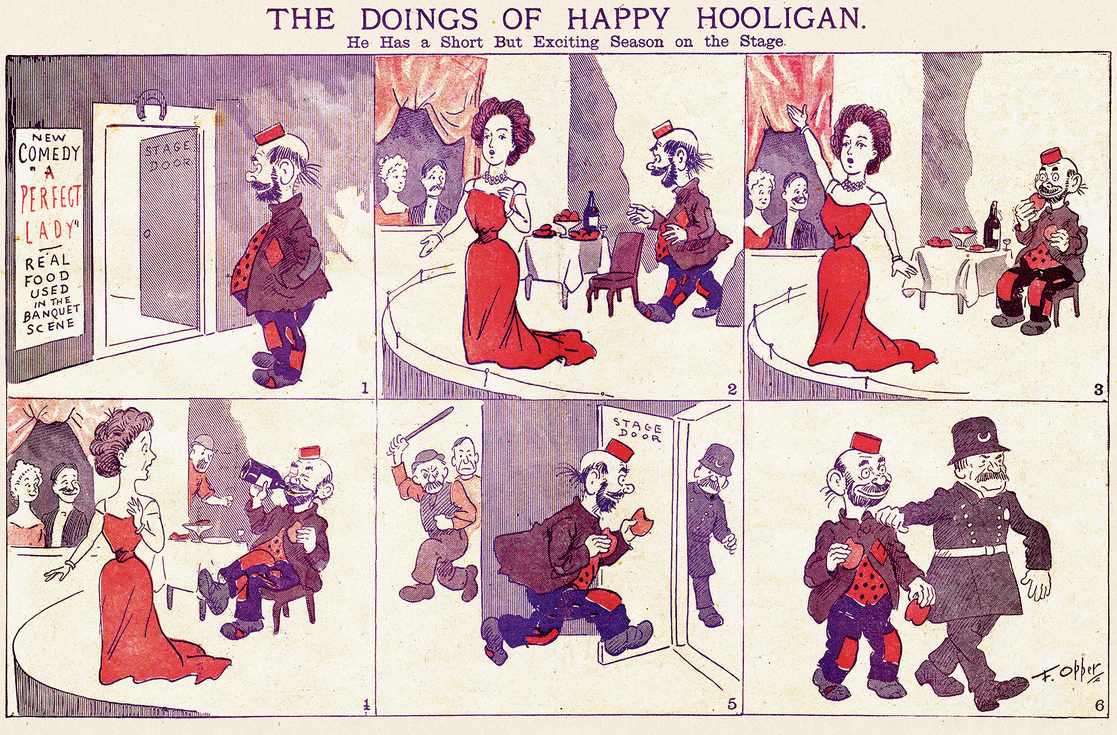
- The first Happy Hooligan strip
- Author: Frederick Burr Opper
- Current status/schedule: Concluded
- Launch date: March 11, 1900; 126 years ago
- End date: August 14, 1932; 94 years ago
- Syndicate(s): King Features Syndicate
- Genre: Humor

Happy Hooligan is an American comic strip, the first major strip by the already celebrated cartoonist Frederick Burr Opper. It debuted with a Sunday strip on March 11, 1900, in the William Randolph Hearst newspapers, and it was one of the first popular comics with King Features Syndicate. The strip ran for three decades, ending on August 14, 1932.

== History ==
The strip told the adventures of a well-meaning hobo who encountered a lot of misfortune and bad luck, partly because of his appearance and low position in society, but who did not lose his smile over it. He was contrasted by his two brothers, the sour Gloomy Gus and the snobbish Montmorency, both just as poor as Happy. Montmorency wore a monocle and a tin can with a label as a hat but was otherwise as ragged as his siblings.

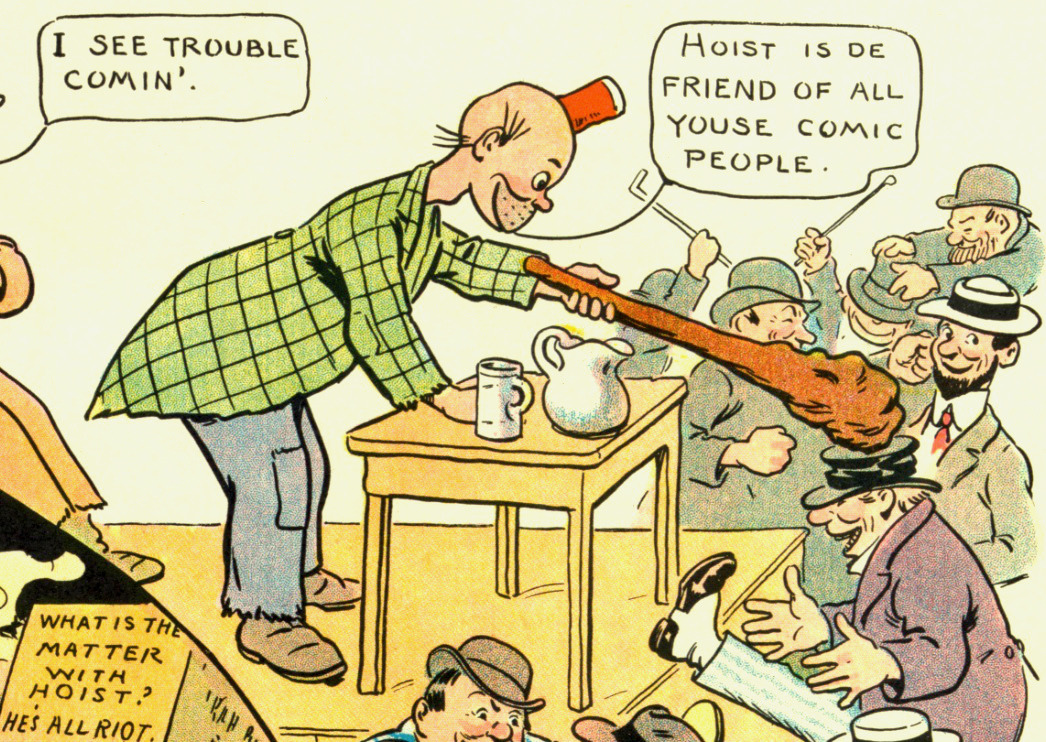
Happy Hooligan detail, from "Hoist, the Friend of the Comic People" in 1906. "Hoist" is William Randolph Hearst.

The archivist Jennifer Huebscher wrote that Opper may have taken inspiration for the Happy Hooligan's look from an illustration done by cartoonist Oscar Bradley depicting a Minnesotan acrobat and vaudeville entertainer named Fred Lowe. Lowe performed in the 1910s and onward under the moniker "The Original Happy Hooligan".

Like the other major comics by Opper, And Her Name Was Maud and Alphonse and Gaston, Happy Hooligan initially did not run on a regular schedule, skipping Sundays from time to time, while some other weeks two pages appeared at once; the character also played a role in some of Opper's daily strips. After a few years, though, Happy Hooligan became a regular feature with both daily strips and Sunday pages.

Beginning in 1904, Opper drew And Her Name Was Maud, about the kicking mule Maud, into comic strips and books, but on May 23, 1926, he positioned And Her Name Was Maud as the topper to his Happy Hooligan, and it ran along with Happy Hooligan until both strips came to a conclusion on October 14, 1932.

The Sunday strip changed titles and focus many times during the 1910s and 20s. The Happy Hooligan Sunday feature went on hiatus after January 16, 1916; when it returned on June 18, 1916, it was called Happy Hooligan's Honeymoon, a title which stuck until April 7, 1918. The next week, it was back to Happy Hooligan until May 26. Starting June 23, the strip was called Dubb Family, and didn't feature any appearances by Happy Hooligan; this title lasted until September 29. From October 6 to November 17, the strip was back to Happy Hooligan, and then switched to Mister Dubb from December 8, 1918, to April 24, 1921. For the next two years—May 1, 1921 to July 29, 1923—the Sunday strip was called Down on the Farm. The title swapped again—now called Mister Dough and Mister Dubb—from August 9, 1925 to January 9, 1927, and then reverted to Happy Hooligan for the rest of the run, until 1932.

As Opper did not use an assistant, the series ended in 1932 when Opper abandoned it due to failing eyesight. While lacking lasting popularity, the series remained influential and inspired other cartoonists such as Rube Goldberg and Jules Feiffer (who compared the title character to President Gerald Ford) and was also arguably a major inspiration for Charlie Chaplin's The Tramp character. It was called "Opper's greatest comic character" by comics artist Coulton Waugh. Happy Hooligan is also cited as the first comic to use speech balloons on a regular basis as an integral part of the comic (The Yellow Kid used speech balloons as early as 1896 but did not use them as the main means of communication).

== Adaptations ==
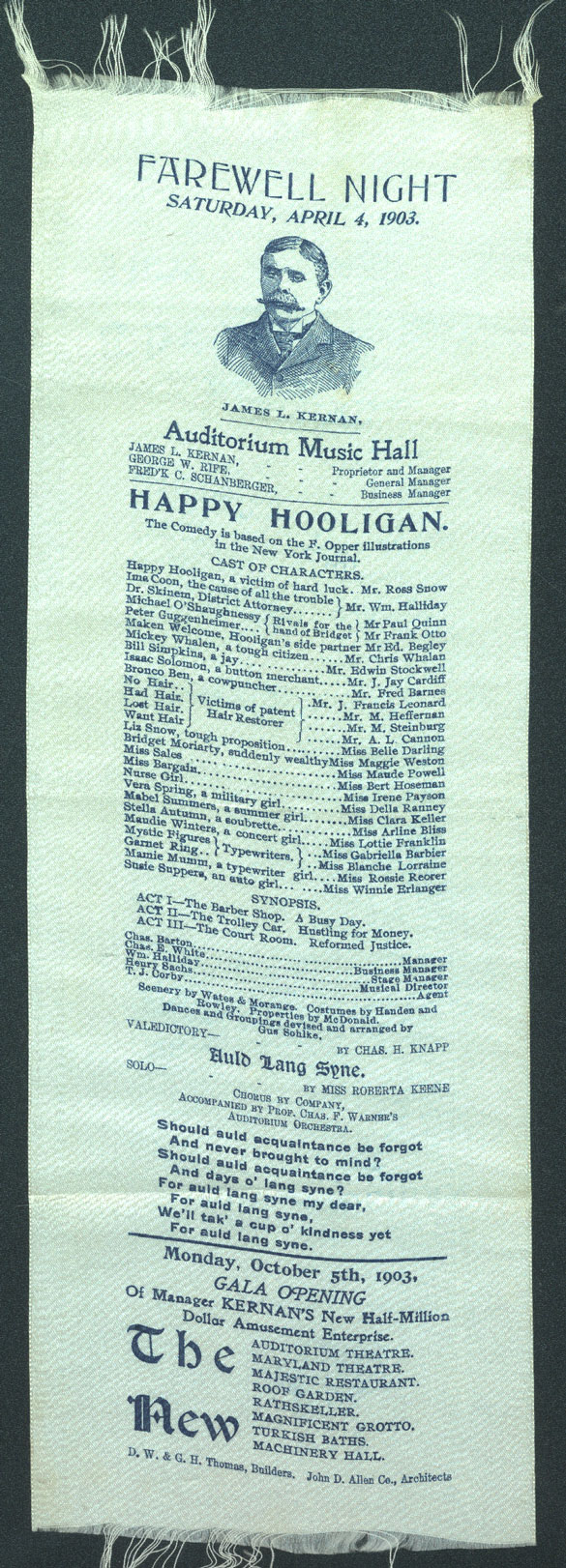
Theater ribbon for play based on the comic strip

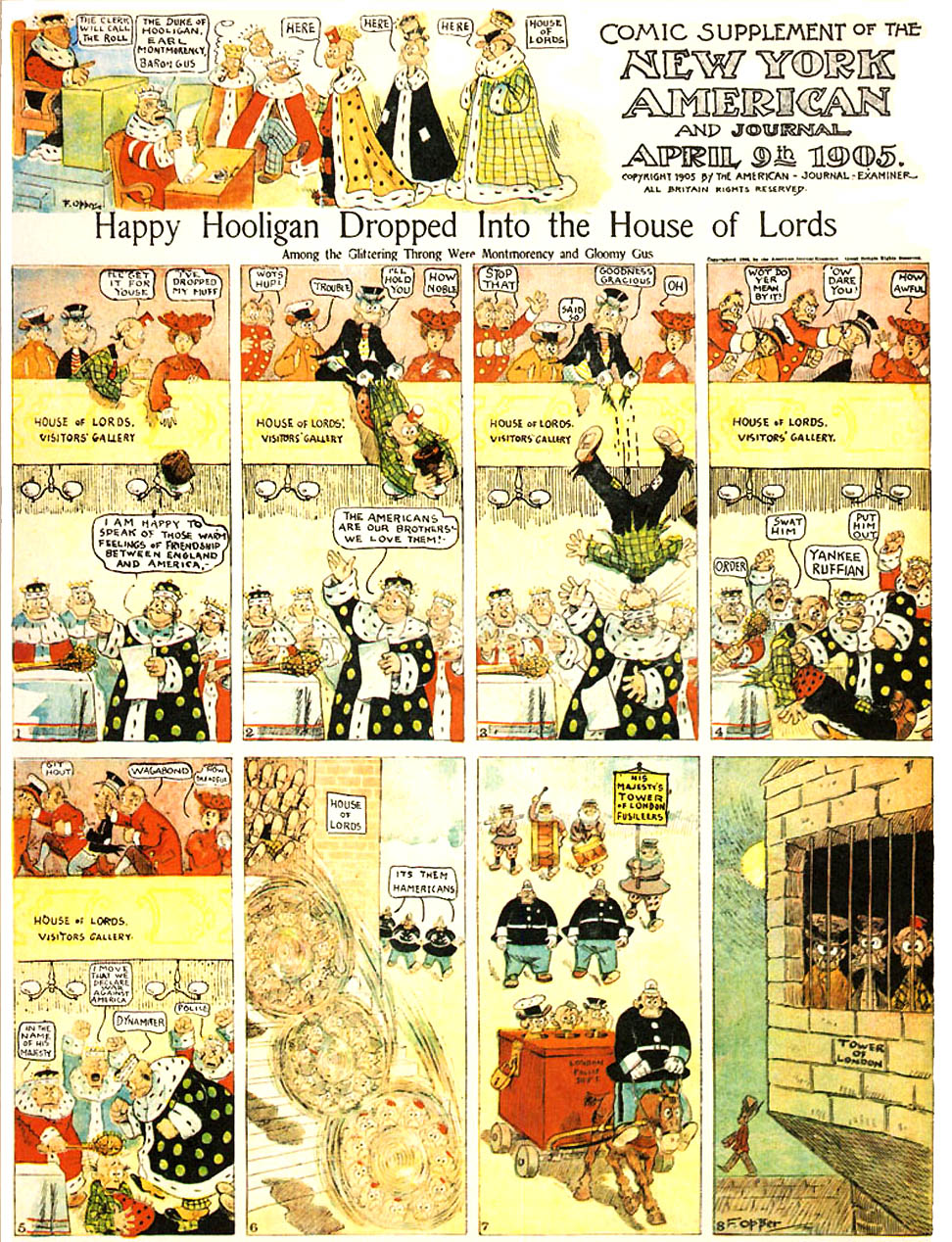
Frederick Opper's Happy Hooligan (April 9, 1905)

Opper was one of the most popular comic creators of his time. Happy Hooligan and his other popular strips were collected in book form and developed into merchandise products. The comic was also translated and became, together with the Katzenjammer Kids and And Her Name Was Maud, one of the first North American comics to be published in Argentina, as Cocoliche.

=== Live-Action Films ===
A number of Happy Hooligan short comic films were produced at the Edison Film Company by director Edwin S. Porter and starring J. Stuart Blackton (who may have directed some as well), including Happy Hooligan April-Fooled (1901), Happy Hooligan Surprised (1901), Happy Hooligan Turns Burglar (1902), Hooligan's Fourth of July (1902), The Twentieth Century Tramp; or, Happy Hooligan and His Airship (1902), Happy Hooligan in a Trap (1903), and Happy Hooligan's Interrupted Lunch (1903).

=== Music ===
In 1902, a music supplement of Hearst's Chicago American featured "Happy Hooligan's Reception", a march and two-step by Richard A. Wilson with lyrics by Curtis Dunham and artwork by F. Opper and R. Dirks.

In 1907, Inter-mountain Republican of Salt Lake City published a piano dance and two-step by Theodore J. Morse titled "Happy Hooligan". The original sheet music carries a 1902 copyright by the American Advance Music Company.

=== Animated Shorts ===
Beginning in 1916, Happy Hooligan was adapted into a series of more than 50 animated cartoons, with the series ending in 1921.

== Legacy ==
In the early 1960s, Happy Hooligan was a semi-regular character in Sam's Strip; dozens of other comic-strip characters had appeared as "guests" in the strip, but Hooligan appeared so often that he was eventually treated as a regular member of the cast.

The strip is referenced in Beverly Cleary's 1961 novel Emily's Runaway Imagination when Mr. Archer is described wearing an tomato soup can tied to the top of his head like Happy Hooligan does when attending the Hard Times party.
