= Frederick Burr Opper =

Cartoonist (1857–1937)

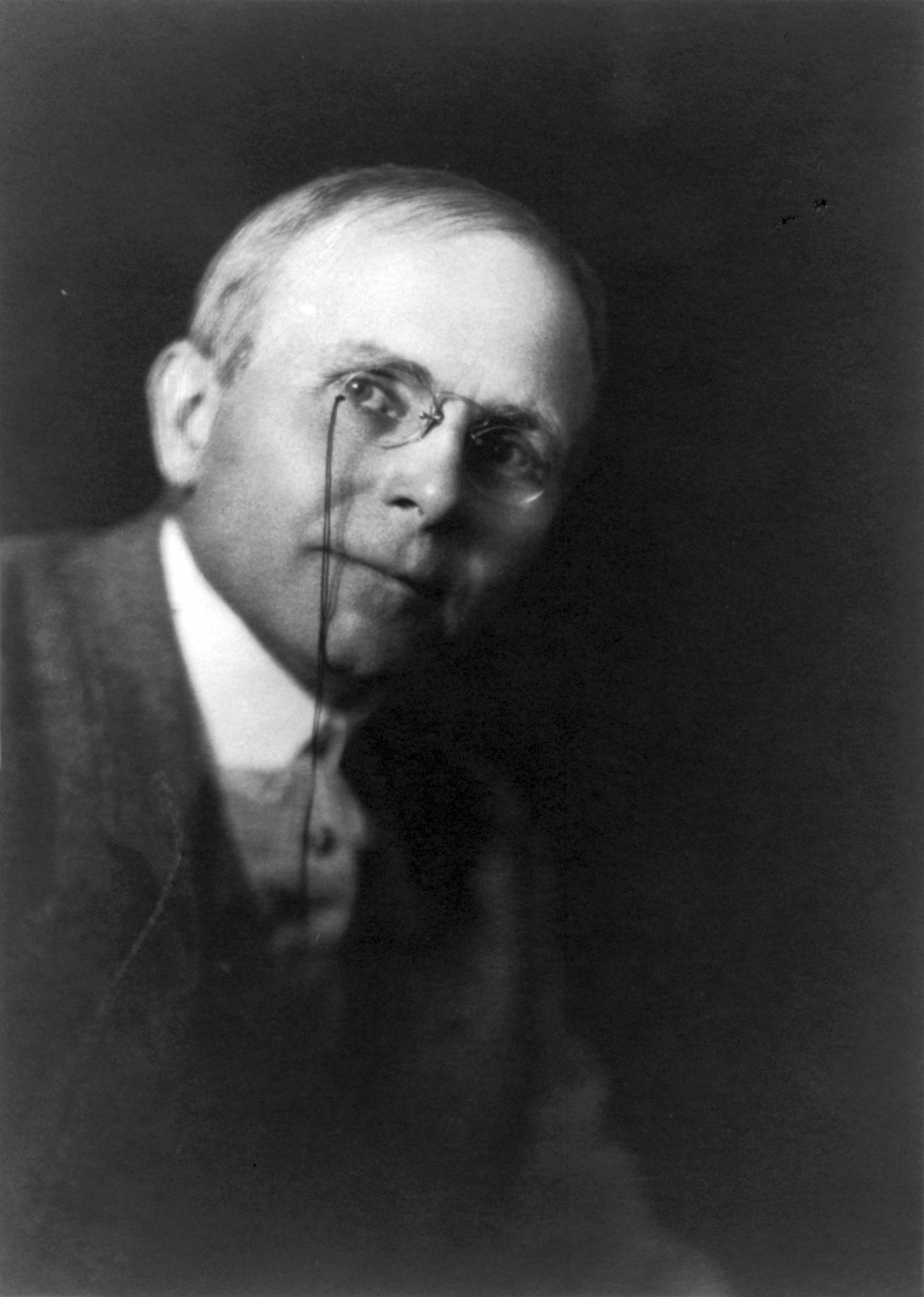
- Portrait c. 1903
- Born: January 2, 1857 Madison, Ohio, U.S.
- Died: August 28, 1937 (aged 80) New Rochelle, New York, U.S.
- Area: Cartoonist
- Notable works: Happy Hooligan

Frederick Burr Opper (January 2, 1857 – August 28, 1937) was one of the pioneers of American newspaper comic strips, best known for his comic strip Happy Hooligan. His comic characters were featured in magazine gag cartoons, covers, political cartoons and comic strips for six decades.

Born to Austrian-American German-speaking immigrants Lewis and Aurelia Burr Oppers in Madison, Ohio, Frederick was the eldest of three children. At the age of 14, he dropped out of school to work as a printer's apprentice at the local Madison Gazette, and at 16, he moved to New York City where he worked in a store and continued to draw. He studied briefly at Cooper Union, followed by a short stint as pupil and assistant to illustrator Frank Beard.

Opper's first cartoon was published in Wild Oats in 1876, followed by cartoons and illustrations in Scribner's Monthly and St. Nicholas Magazine. He worked as illustrator at Frank Leslie's Weekly from 1877 to 1880. Opper was then hired to draw for Puck by publishers Joseph Keppler and Adolph Schwarzmann. He stayed with Puck for 18 years, drawing everything from spot illustrations to chromolithograph covers.

Opper married Nellie Barnett on May 18, 1881. They had three children, Lawrence, Anna and Sophia.

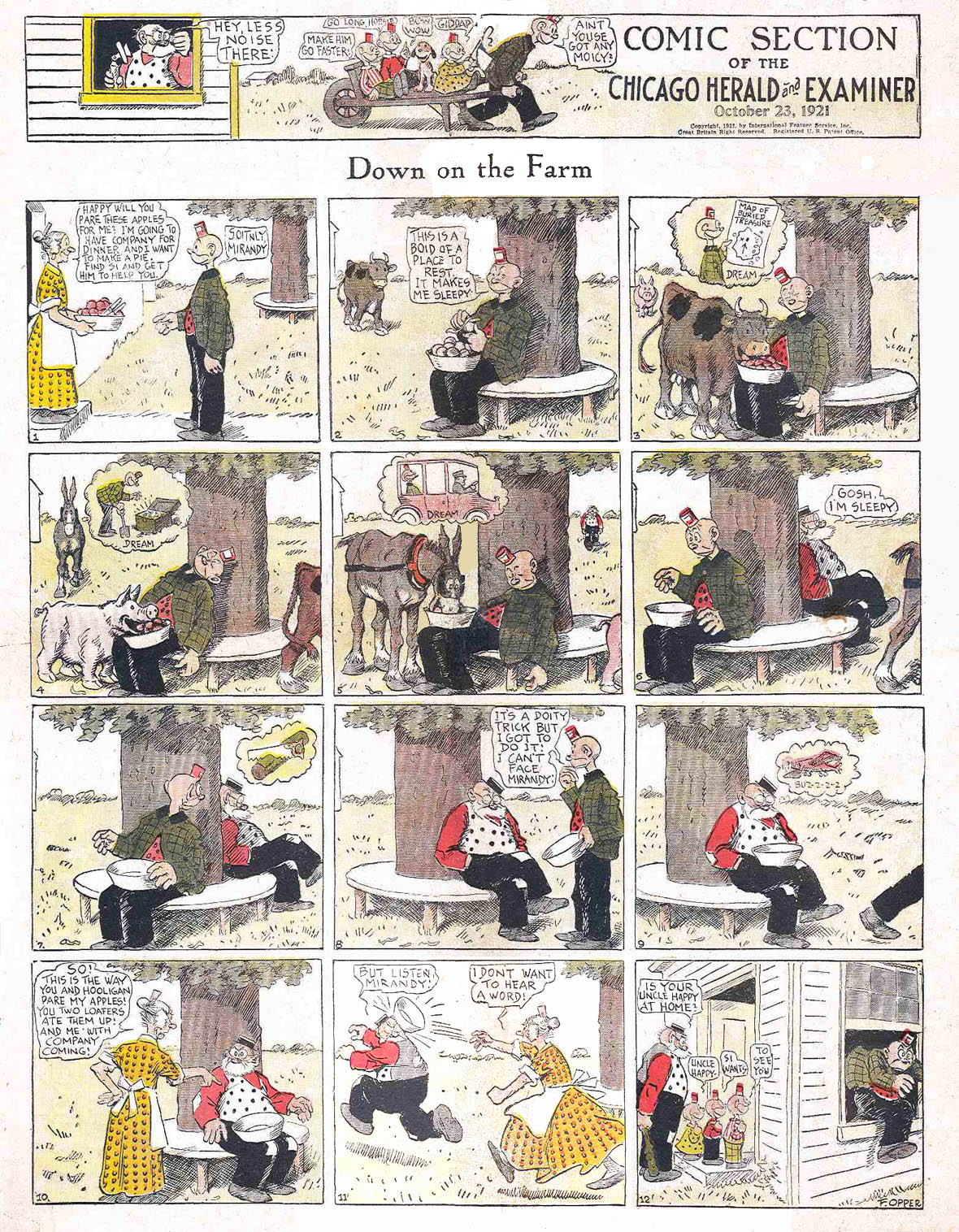
Frederick Opper's Happy Hooligan (October 23, 1921)

== Career ==
=== Happy Hooligan ===
In 1899, Opper accepted an offer by William Randolph Hearst for a position with the New York Journal. His Happy Hooligan strip first appeared in the New York Journal in 1900, and it ran until 1932. Hooligan was a tramp with a little tin can hat whose gentle simplicity and bumbling good nature made him a success. On Happy's 30th birthday, Opper threw a party attended by President Hoover, former President Coolidge, Charles Schwab, Alfred E. Smith and others.

Opper's other popular strips were Alphonse and Gaston, And Her Name Was Maud, Howsan Lott and Our Antediluvian Ancestors. Beginning in 1904, Opper drew And Her Name Was Maud, about the kicking mule Maud, into comic strips, books and animation. On May 23, 1926, he positioned And Her Name Was Maud as the topper to Happy Hooligan, where it ran until both strips came to a conclusion on October 14, 1932.

Opper's strips were very popular in Italy, where Hooligan was the most loved strip character in Italy before the coming of Mickey Mouse, as declared by the major Italian poet Attilio Bertolucci. Hooligan's name in Italy was Fortunello (small lucky), and Maud's name was Checca (Francy).

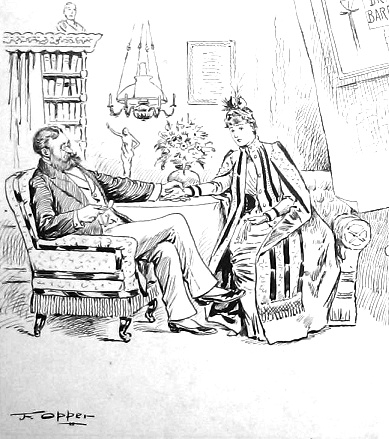
Frederick Opper's "The Importance of a Beard" (c. 1890) for Puck

=== Political cartoons ===
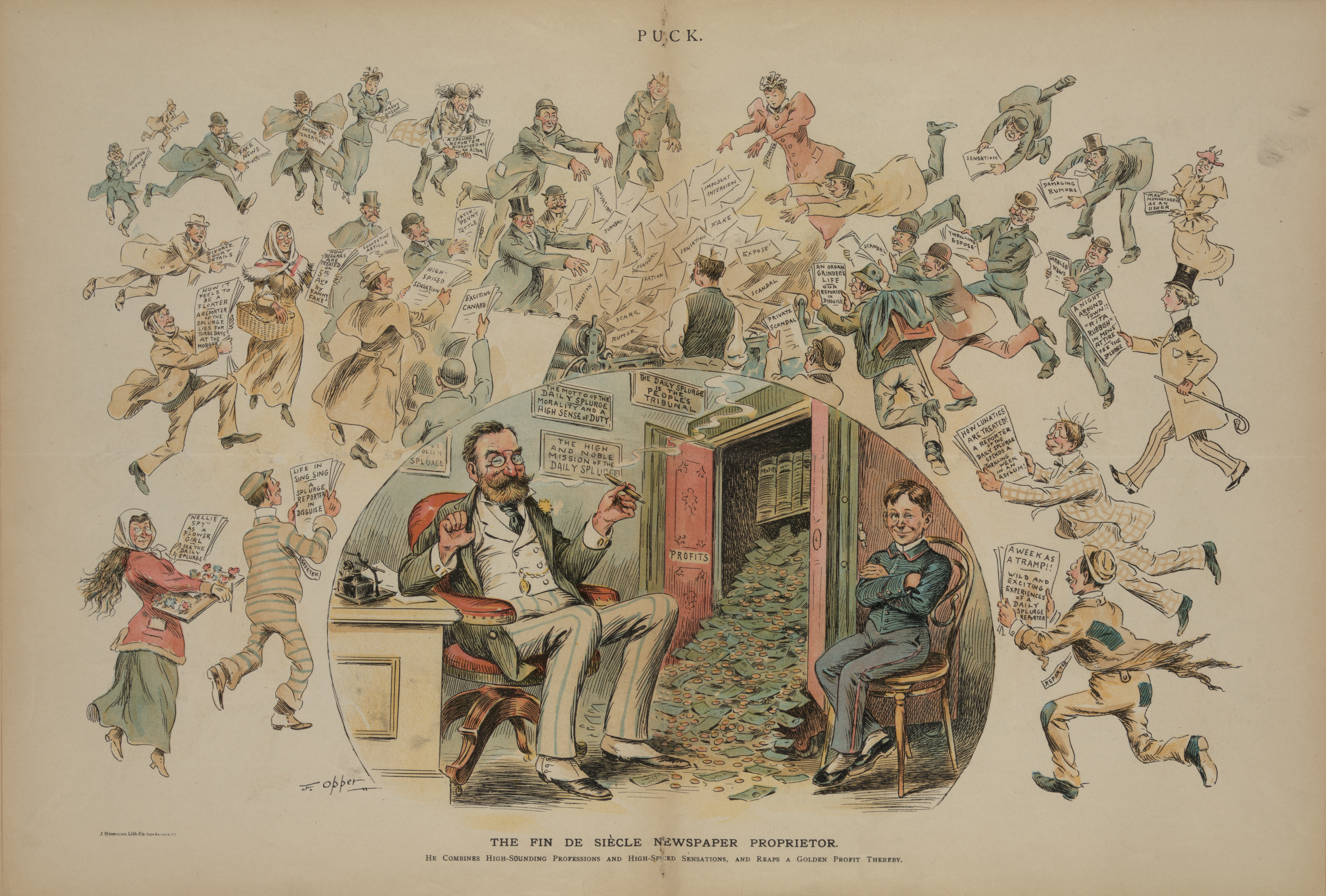
Opper's cartoon The fin de siècle newspaper proprietor was an early use of the term fake news

Among Opper's contributions for Puck was a cartoon that satirized the rise of sensationalism in journalism: this cartoon, from March 7, 1894, shows a newspaper mogul (possibly Joseph Pulitzer) raking in the profits, yet misleading the public. Noteworthy in this political cartoon is an early use of the term "fake news." In addition, Opper drew influential political cartoons supporting Hearst's campaign against the "trusts" with characters "Willie and Teddy", depicting William McKinley and Theodore Roosevelt, "Willie and his Papa", satirizing McKinley and "Papa Trusts", and "Nursie", a depiction of Cleveland industrialist Mark Hanna. Opper's other characters included Mr. Common Man, which is believed to be the origin of John Q. Public. His artwork appeared in Hearst's New York Journal, Boston American, Chicago Examiner, San Francisco Examiner and Los Angeles Examiner. In 1902 he published "Nursery Rhymes for Infant Industries: An Alphabet of Joyous Trusts" in which each of the 26 Alphabet letters began an anti-trust rhyme.

Opper also illustrated books for Edgar Wilson Nye, Mark Twain, Marietta Holley (i.e.: Samantha at Saratoga, or Racin' After Fashion), and Finley Peter Dunne, and, as well, published his own books, including Puck's Opper Book (1888), The Folks in Funnyville (1900) and Happy Hooligan Home Again (1907).

Opper was a member of several New York clubs, and he painted as a hobby. He retired in 1934 due to failing eyesight. He died August 28, 1937, at his home in New Rochelle, New York, and was cremated. Cartoonists Russ Westover and Alex Raymond took part in an August 29, 1937, memorial to Opper broadcast on New York's WNEW.

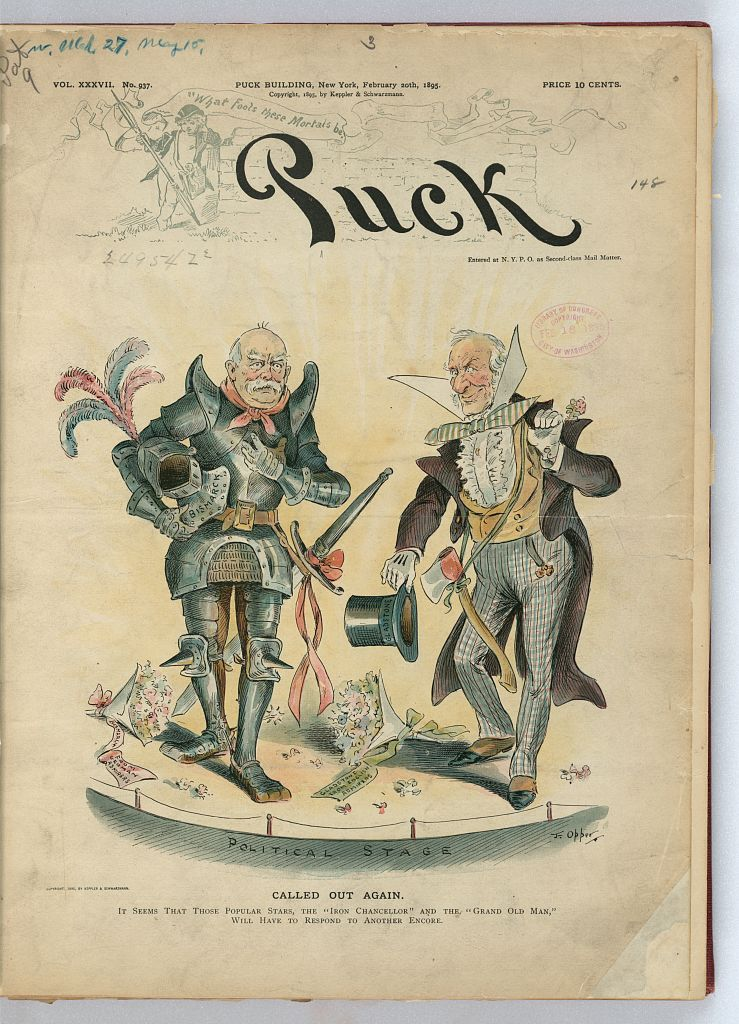
Caricature by Opper 1895 of Germany's Bismarck & Britain's Gladstone as performers on the political stage.
