= Aesop's Fables (film series) =

Series of animated short films (1921-1934)

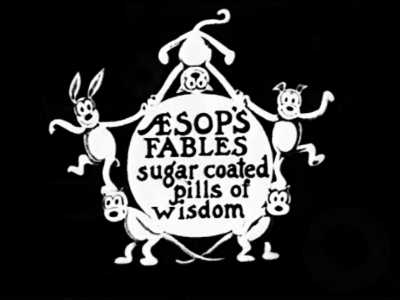
- Aesop's Fables closing title
- Directed by: Paul Terry; John Foster; Mannie Davis; Frank Moser; Harry Bailey; Jerry Shields; Eddie Donnelly; Steve Mufatti; Hugh Harman; Rudolf Ising; Rollin Hamilton; Thomas McKimson
- Produced by: Paul Terry; Amedee J. Van Beuren
- Music by: Gene Rodemich; Winston Sharples; Frank Marsales
- Color process: Black-and-white
- Production company: The Van Beuren Corporation
- Distributed by: Pathé; RKO Radio Pictures
- Running time: 5 — 8 Minutes
- Country: United States
- Language: English

Aesop's Fables (previously titled Aesop's Film Fables and Aesop's Sound Fables) is a series of animated short subjects, created by American cartoonist Paul Terry. Produced from 1921 to 1934, notable cartoons in the series include: The Window Washers (1925), Scrambled Eggs (1926), Small Town Sheriff (1927), Dinner Time (1928), and Gypped in Egypt (1930). Dinner Time was the first cartoon with a synchronized soundtrack released to the public.

== History ==
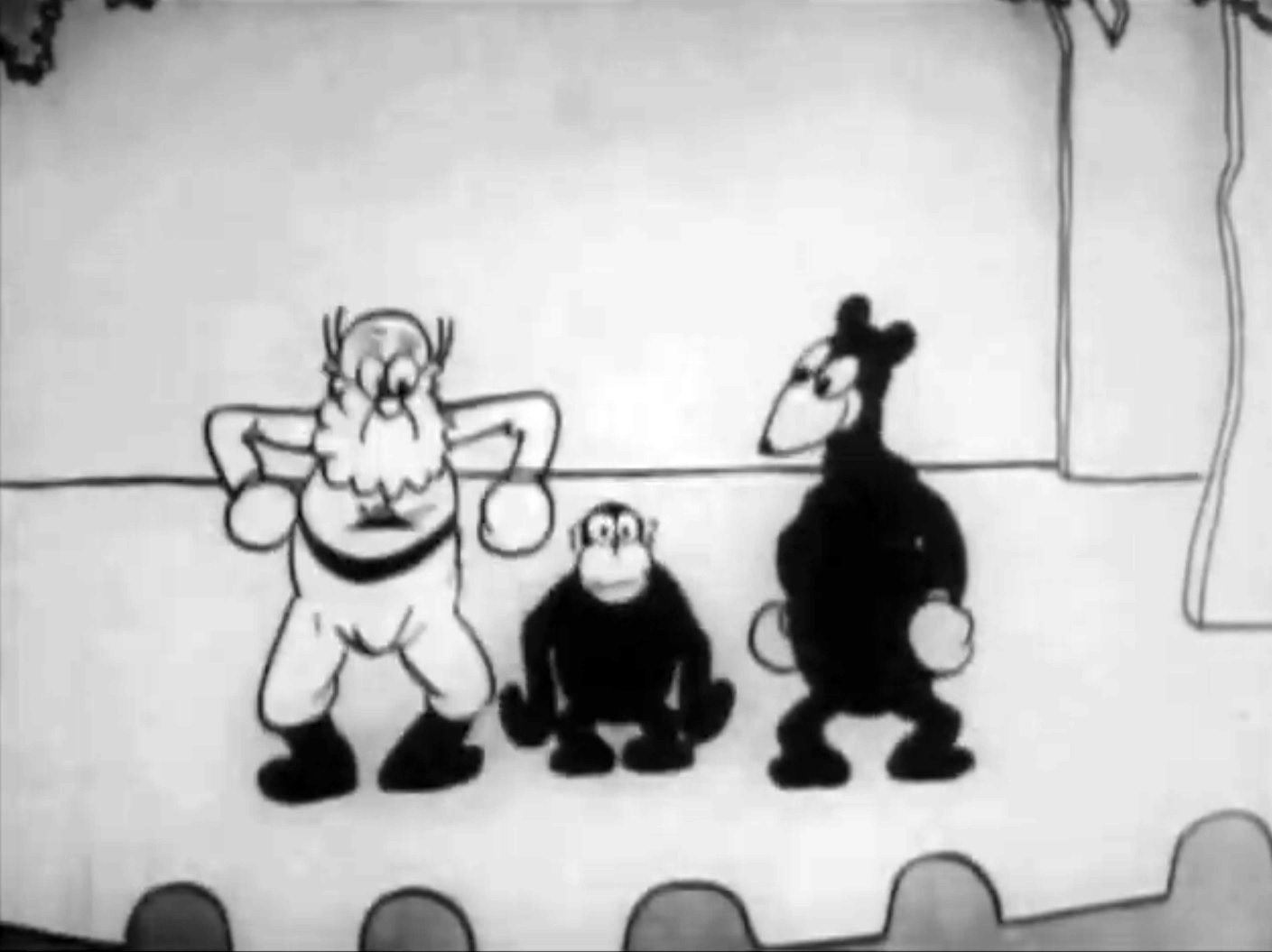
Farmer Al Falfa in Amateur Night on the Ark (1923)

Terry was inspired to make the series by young actor-turned-writer Howard Estabrook, who suggested making a series of cartoons based on Aesop's Fables. Although Terry later claimed he had never heard of Aesop, he said that Estabrook's idea was worthwhile. However, historian Hal Erickson notes that this claim that Paul Terry had never heard of Aesop is false, given that these fables were widely taught in all American schools at the time. Terry immediately began to set up a new studio called Fables Studios, Inc. and received backing from the Keith-Albee Theatre circuit.

The series launched on June 19, 1921, with The Goose That Laid the Golden Egg. On that same day, Van Beuren announced that the pictures would be distributed exclusively by Pathe. Only the earliest films are loose adaptations of the actual fables and later entries usually revolve around cats, mice, and the disgruntled Farmer Al Falfa. Terry had developed Farmer Al in the previous decade, and this series would be his most prolific appearance. Cartoonist Milt Gross worked briefly on the series as scriptwriter and animator.

Each short concludes with a moral that usually has nothing to do with the actual cartoon itself. Terry staffer Mannie Davis once remarked that the morals were even "funnier than the whole picture itself" and Terry said "the fact that they're ambiguous is the thing that made 'em funny". Morals include "Go around with a chip on your shoulder and someone will knock your block off" or "Marriage is a good institution, but who wants to live in an institution?". As the series became all-talking, these morals became brief animated vignettes in 1929, often featuring a cat and a mouse. However, these were dropped by early-1930.

The series proved to be enormously popular with the public during the 1920s. Walt Disney admitted that his earliest ambition was to produce cartoons of comparable quality to Paul Terry. With the popularity of Al Jolson's part-talkie The Jazz Singer in 1927, as well as the huge success of the first all-talkie Lights of New York in 1928, producer Amadee J. Van Beuren realized the potential of sound films and bought Fables Studios to produce sound animation films. Van Beuren, now owner of the newly-named Van Beuren Studios, urged Terry to add the innovation to his films. Terry argued that adding sound would only complicate the production process, but ended up doing so anyway, and the series was renamed to Aesop's Sound Fables.

Released on October 14, 1928. Dinner Time was the first cartoon with a synchronized soundtrack ever released to the public, (Note: From May 1924 to September 1926, Max Fleischer had released the series Song Car-Tunes made in DeForest Phonofilm but only the music, not dialogue, is synched to the bouncing ball gimmick.) but the film did not catch on and was soon overshadowed by Disney's Steamboat Willie, released on November 18 of the same year. Fables Studios did not cease production of silent cartoons until the release of A Bugville Romance on June 8, 1930. Other entries in the series are: The Window Washers (1925), Scrambled Eggs (1926), Small Town Sheriff (1927), A Close Call (1929), The Iron Man (1930), Good Old Schooldays (1930), Dixie Days (1930), Western Whoopee (1930), Laundry Blues (1930), Circus Capers (1930), Gypped in Egypt (1930), College Capers (1931), Cinderella Blues (1931), The Wild Goose Chase (1932), and Silvery Moon (1933).

In 1929 Paul Terry quit, starting his own TerryToons Studios, and John Foster took over the series under The Van Beuren Corporation, formerly Fables Studios, Inc. In early 1933, John Foster was also dismissed from his position as studio head in favor of conductor and composer Gene Rodemich. Van Beuren tasked Rodemich with creating animated adaptations of characters from cartoonist Otto Soglow's comic strips The Little King and Sentinel Louey. The first film produced, A Dizzy Day, was praised by critics for its modernist musical accompaniment.

In 1933, Van Beuren introduced Cubby Bear, a protagonist for the series to compete against Mickey Mouse, Oswald the Lucky Rabbit and Bosko. Cubby was meant to be the successor of their Milton & Rita Mouse characters. Van Beuren then subcontracted three cartoons to Bosko creators Hugh Harman and Rudolf Ising, who had cut ties with producer Leon Schlesinger over budget issues after having produced the Looney Tunes and Merrie Melodies series for Schlesinger and Warner Bros. Pictures from 1930 to 1933. Three cartoons were produced and two were released, while one, Mischievous Mice, was cancelled after animation production was completed; Harman acquired the film's rights in 1948 and released it in television packages as a silent film with added sound.

The series finally came to an end in 1934, when the studio's veteran animators, fed up with the hours of unpaid overtime imposed by Van Beuren, decided to attempt unionization. These meetings were led by animator Harry Bailey, who had recently been introduced to socialist ideas by comic book artist Otto Soglow, for whom he had adapted several of his comics into animation. However, one of the studio's leading animators, Vernon Stallings, decided to denounce his colleagues to Van Beuren in exchange for taking over the studio from Bailey. In retaliation, Van Beuren decided to fire all the employees who had attended union meetings, with the exception of conductor Gene Rodemich, bringing Aesop's Fables featuring Cubby Bear to an abrupt halt, as well as canceling new series in production, such as the animated adaptation of the Amos 'n Andy series and another unnamed animated series centered on the Lucky Leo and Lily Lion characters. The Internet Movie Database (IMDb) lists 447 titles from 1920 to 1929 under the production company name of Aesop Fables Studio, and 198 titles under Van Beuren Studios from 1928 to 1934.

== Filmography ==
=== 1921 ===
#	Title	Release Date	Director	Distributor	Film	Notes
1	The Goose That Laid the Golden Egg	June 19, 1921	Paul Terry	Pathé Exchange	Not Publicly Available	The first Aesop Fable cartoon released.
2	Mice in Council	June 26, 1921	Unknown	Pathé Exchange		Retitled "Secret Council" for TV release.
3	The Rooster and the Eagle	July 3, 1921	Paul Terry	Pathé Exchange	Not Publicly Available	
4	The Ants and the Grasshopper	July 10, 1921	Unknown	Pathé Exchange		
5	Cats at Law	July 17, 1921	Paul Terry	Pathé Exchange	Considered Lost	
6	The Lioness and the Bugs	July 24, 1921	Paul Terry	Pathé Exchange	Not Publicly Available	Also known as “The Lioness and the Eggs”.
7	The Country Mouse and the City Mouse	July 31, 1921	Paul Terry	Pathé Exchange	Not Publicly Available	Also known as "The Country Mouse".
8	The Cat and the Canary	August 7, 1921	Paul Terry	Pathé Exchange	Home Movie Release. Missing Scenes.	Currently only exists in a 8mm cutdown version.
9	The Fox and the Crow	August 14, 1921	Frank Moser	Pathé Exchange		
10	The Donkey In The Lion's Skin	August 21, 1921	Unknown	Pathé Exchange	Not Publicly Available	Sometimes known as "Donkey In Lion's Skin" or “The Donkey and the Lion King”.
11	Mice at War	August 28, 1921	Paul Terry	Pathé Exchange	Not Publicly Available	
12	The Hare and the Frogs	September 4, 1921	Paul Terry	Pathé Exchange	Considered Lost	Also known as "Hare and Frogs".
13	The Fashionable Fox	September 11, 1921	Paul Terry	Pathé Exchange	Not Publicly Available	
14	The Hermit and the Bear	September 18, 1921	Paul Terry	Pathé Exchange	Considered Lost	
15	The Hare and the Tortoise	September 25, 1921	Paul Terry	Pathé Exchange	Considered Lost	
16	The Wolf and the Crane	October 2, 1921	Unknown	Pathé Exchange	Not Publicly Available	
17	Venus and the Cat	October 9, 1921	Unknown	Pathé Exchange	TV Release. Missing Scenes.	Retitled "All In A Day" for TV release. Missing some scenes.
18	The Frog and the Ox	October 16, 1921	Paul Terry	Pathé Exchange	Considered Lost	
19	The Dog and the Bone	October 23, 1921	Paul Terry	Pathé Exchange	Considered Lost	
20	The Cat and the Monkey	October 30, 1921	Paul Terry	Pathé Exchange	Not Publicly Available	
21	The Fox and the Goat	November 6, 1921	Paul Terry	Pathé Exchange	Considered Lost	
22	The Owl and the Grasshopper	November 13, 1921	Paul Terry	Pathé Exchange	Considered Lost	
23	The Woman and the Hen	November 20, 1921	Paul Terry	Pathé Exchange	Not Publicly Available	
24	The Frogs That Wanted A King	November 27, 1921	Paul Terry	Pathé Exchange	Fragment.	Currently exists only as a fragment.
25	The Fly and the Ants	December 4, 1921	Paul Terry	Pathé Exchange	Not Publicly Available	
26	The Conceited Donkey	December 11, 1921	Unknown	Pathé Exchange	Not Publicly Available	
27	The Wolf and the Kid	December 18, 1921	Paul Terry	Pathé Exchange	TV Release.	Retitled "Dancing Kid" for TV release.
28	The Wayward Dog	December 25, 1921	Paul Terry	Pathé Exchange	Not Publicly Available	

=== 1922 ===
#	Title	Release Date	Director	Distributor	Film	Notes
29	The Cat and the Mice	January 1, 1922	Unknown	Pathé Exchange		Retitled "Cat And Mice" for TV release.
30	The Dog and the Mosquito	January 8, 1922	Paul Terry	Pathé Exchange	Missing Scenes.	Missing some scenes.
31	The Dog and the Flea	January 15, 1922	Paul Terry	Pathé Exchange	Not Publicly Available	
32	The Bear and the Bees	January 22, 1922	Paul Terry	Pathé Exchange	Not Publicly Available	Retitled "The Musical Bear" for TV release.
33	The Miller and His Donkey	January 29, 1922	John Foster, Harry Bailey, & Frank Moser	Pathé Exchange	Cartoon Link	Retitled "Donkey Tricks" for TV release.
34	The Fox and the Grapes	February 5, 1922	Unknown	Pathé Exchange	TV Release.	Retitled "The Foolish Fox" for TV release.
35	The Villain In Disguise	February 12, 1922	Unknown	Pathé Exchange	Not Publicly Available	Retitled "Villain At Large" for TV release.
36	The Dog and the Thief	February 19, 1922	John Foster, Harry Bailey, & Frank Moser	Pathé Exchange	TV Release.	
37	The Cat and the Swordfish	February 26, 1922	Paul Terry	Pathé Exchange	Not Publicly Available	
38	The Tiger and the Donkey	March 5, 1922	Paul Terry	Pathé Exchange	Not Publicly Available	
39	The Spendthrift	March 12, 1922	Paul Terry	Pathé Exchange	TV Release.	
40	The Farmer and the Ostrich	March 19, 1922	John Foster, Harry Bailey, & Frank Moser	Pathé Exchange	TV Release.	
41	The Dissatisfied Cobbler	March 26, 1922	Paul Terry	Pathé Exchange	Not Publicly Available	
42	The Lion and the Mouse	April 2, 1922	Unknown	Pathé Exchange	Home Movie Release.	
43	The Rich Cat and the Poor Cat	April 9, 1922	Paul Terry	Pathé Exchange	Not Publicly Available	
44	The Wolf In Sheep's Clothing	April 16, 1922	Paul Terry	Pathé Exchange	TV Release.	Retitled "Beware The Bear" & “A Wolf In Sheep’s Clothing” for TV release.
45	The Wicked Cat	April 23, 1922	Unknown	Pathé Exchange	TV Release.	
46	The Boy and His Dog	April 30, 1922	Unknown	Pathé Exchange	TV Release.	Retitled "Boy And Dog" for TV release.
47	The Eternal Triangle	May 7, 1922	Paul Terry	Pathé Exchange	TV Release. Missing Scenes.	Missing some scenes.
48	The Model Dairy	May 14, 1922	Frank Moser & Paul Terry	Pathé Exchange	TV Release.	
50	Love at First Sight	May 21, 1922	Paul Terry	Pathé Exchange	Considered Lost	
51	The Hunter and His Dog	May 28, 1922	Paul Terry	Pathé Exchange	Not Publicly Available	
52	The Dog and the Wolves	June 4, 1922	Paul Terry	Pathé Exchange	Not Publicly Available	
53	The Maid and the Millionaire	June 11, 1922	Paul Terry	Pathé Exchange	Considered Lost	
54	The Farmer and His Cat	June 18, 1922	Paul Terry	Pathé Exchange	Missing Scenes.	Missing some scenes.
55	The Cat and the Pig	June 25, 1922	Unknown	Pathé Exchange	Not Publicly Available	
56	The Country Mouse And City Cat	July 2, 1922	Paul Terry	Pathé Exchange	Considered Lost	
57	Crime In A Big City	July 9, 1922	Paul Terry	Pathé Exchange	Considered Lost	
58	The Brewing Trouble	July 16, 1922	Paul Terry	Pathé Exchange	Considered Lost	
59	The Mischievous Cat	July 23, 1922	Unknown	Pathé Exchange	Cartoon Link	Missing some scenes.
60	The Worm That Turned	July 30, 1922	Paul Terry	Pathé Exchange	Considered Lost	
61	The Boastful Cat	August 6, 1922	Paul Terry	Pathé Exchange	Missing Scenes.	Missing some scenes.
62	The Dog and the Fish	August 13, 1922	Paul Terry	Pathé Exchange	Considered Lost	
63	The Farmer and the Mice	August 20, 1922	John Foster, Harry Bailey, & Frank Moser	Pathé Exchange	TV Release.	
64	The Mechanical Horse	August 27, 1922	Paul Terry	Pathé Exchange	Not Publicly Available	
65	The Fearless Fido	September 3, 1922	John Foster, Harry Bailey, & Frank Moser	Pathé Exchange	TV Release.	
66	The Boy and the Bear	September 10, 1922	Paul Terry	Pathé Exchange	Lost film	
67	The Two Explorers	September 17, 1922	Paul Terry	Pathé Exchange	Lost film	Featured two characters named Tom Cat and Jerry Mouse, names now famously associated to MGM's "Tom and Jerry".
68	The Two Slick Traders	September 24, 1922	Paul Terry	Pathé Exchange	Home Movie Release. Cut-Down Home Movie Release.	Retitled "On The Farm" & "Farmer Gray Makes A Deal" for Home Movie release.
69	The Big Flood	October 1, 1922	Unknown	Pathé Exchange	Cartoon Link	
70	The Hated Rivals	October 8, 1922	John Foster, Harry Bailey, & Frank Moser	Pathé Exchange	Missing Scenes.	Retitled "The Little Hero" for TV release. Missing some scenes.
71	The Two of a Trade	October 15, 1922	Unknown	Pathé Exchange	TV Release.	Retitled "Fisherman's Dream" For TV release.
72	The Romantic Mouse	October 22, 1922	Paul Terry	Pathé Exchange	Not Publicly Available	
73	Henpecked Harry	October 29, 1922		Pathé Exchange	TV Release.	
74	The Elephant's Trunk	November 5, 1922	John Foster, Harry Bailey, Frank Moser, & Paul Terry	Pathé Exchange	Not Publicly Available	
75	The Enchanted Fiddle	November 12, 1922	John Foster, Harry Bailey, & Frank Moser	Pathé Exchange	Cartoon Link	
76	A Rolling Stone	November 19, 1922	Paul Terry	Pathé Exchange	Considered Lost	
77	The Fortune Hunters	November 26, 1922	John Foster, Harry Bailey, & Frank Moser	Pathé Exchange	Not Publicly Available	
79	Friday The Thirteenth	December 3, 1922	Unknown	Pathé Exchange	TV Release.	
80	The Man Who Laughed	December 10, 1922	Paul Terry	Pathé Exchange	TV Release.	Retitled “The Man Who Laughs” for TV release.
81	Henry's Busted Romance	December 17, 1922	Paul Terry	Pathé Exchange		Retitled "Dream Girl" for TV release.
82	The Dog's Paradise	December 24, 1922	Paul Terry	Pathé Exchange	Considered Lost	
83	Two Trappers	December 31, 1922	Paul Terry	Pathé Exchange	Not Publicly Available	

=== 1923 ===
#	Title	Release Date	Director	Distributor	Film	Notes
84	The Frog and the Catfish	January 7, 1923	Paul Terry	Pathé Exchange	Not Publicly Available	
85	A Stone Age Romeo	January 14, 1923	Paul Terry	Pathé Exchange	Not Publicly Available	
86	Cheating the Cheaters	January 21, 1923	Paul Terry	Pathé Exchange	Not Publicly Available	
87	A Fisherman's Jinx	January 28, 1923	Unknown	Pathé Exchange	Not Publicly Available	
88	A Raisin and a Cake of Yeast	February 4, 1923	Paul Terry	Pathé Exchange	TV Release.	Retitled "Chemistry Lesson" for TV release.
89	The Gliders	February 11, 1923	Paul Terry	Pathé Exchange		
90	Troubles on the Ark	February 18, 1923	Unknown	Pathé Exchange	Not Publicly Available	
91	The Mysterious Hat	February 25, 1923	Paul Terry	Pathé Exchange	TV Release.	Retitled "Sharpshooter" for TV release.
92	The Spider and the Fly	March 4, 1923	Paul Terry	Pathé Exchange	Considered Lost	
93	The Traveling Salesman	March 11, 1923	Unknown	Pathé Exchange	TV Release. Missing Scenes.	Retitled "Smart Salesman" for TV release. Missing some scenes.
94	The Sheik	March 18, 1923	Unknown	Pathé Exchange	Not Publicly Available	
95	The Alley Cat	March 25, 1923	Unknown	Pathé Exchange		
96	Farmer Al Falfa's Bride	April 1, 1923	Paul Terry	Pathé Exchange	TV Release. Missing Scenes.	Retitled "Wedding Bells" for TV release. Missing some scenes.
97	Day By Day in Every Way	April 8, 1923	Paul Terry	Pathé Exchange	TV Release.	
98	One Hard Pull	April 15, 1923	Unknown	Pathé Exchange	Cartoon Link	
99	The Gamblers	April 22, 1923	Paul Terry	Pathé Exchange	Not Publicly Available	
100	The Jolly Rounders	April 29, 1923	Paul Terry	Pathé Exchange	TV Release.	
101	Pharaoh's Tomb	May 6, 1923	Paul Terry	Pathé Exchange	Considered Lost	
102	The Mouse Catcher	May 13, 1923	Unknown	Pathé Exchange	Home Movie Release.	
105	A Fishy Story	May 20, 1923	Unknown	Pathé Exchange	Not Publicly Available	Also known as “A Fish Story”.
106	Amateur Night on the Ark	May 27, 1923	Paul Terry	Pathé Exchange	TV Release.	
107	Spooks	June 3, 1923	Paul Terry	Pathé Exchange	Not Publicly Available	
108	The Stork's Mistake	June 10, 1923	Paul Terry	Pathé Exchange	Not Publicly Available	Possibly the first Aesop Fable cartoon without the “The Fable of” prefix in the title card.
109	Springtime	June 17, 1923	Paul Terry	Pathé Exchange	TV Release.	
110	The Burglar Alarm	June 24, 1923	Unknown	Pathé Exchange	TV Release.	
111	The Beauty Parlor	July 1, 1923	Paul Terry	Pathé Exchange	Not Publicly Available	
112	The Covered Push-Cart	July 8, 1923	Unknown	Pathé Exchange	Considered Lost	
113	The Pace That Kills	July 15, 1923	Unknown	Pathé Exchange	TV Release.	Renamed to "Pace That Kills" for TV release.
114	Mysteries Of The Sea	July 22, 1923	Paul Terry	Pathé Exchange	TV Release.	Retitled "Wonders Of The Deep" for TV release.
115	The Thoroughbred	July 29, 1923	Paul Terry	Pathé Exchange	Cartoon Link	Retitled "Feathered Friend" for TV release.
116	The Marathon Dancers	August 5, 1923	Unknown	Pathé Exchange	TV Release.	
117	The Pearl Divers	August 12, 1923	Unknown	Pathé Exchange		
118	The Bad Bandit	August 19, 1923	Paul Terry & Mannie Davis	Pathé Exchange	Considered Lost	
119	The Great Explorers	August 26, 1923	Paul Terry	Pathé Exchange	Not Publicly Available	
120	The Cat That Failed	September 2, 1923	Paul Terry	Pathé Exchange	Not Publicly Available	
121	The Walrus Hunters	September 9, 1923	Paul Terry	Pathé Exchange	Missing Scenes.	Missing some scenes.
122	The Cat's Revenge	September 16, 1923	Unknown	Pathé Exchange	Cartoon Link	
123	Derby Day	September 23, 1923	Paul Terry	Pathé Exchange	Not Publicly Available	
124	Love In A Cottage	September 30, 1923	Paul Terry	Pathé Exchange	Not Publicly Available	
125	The Cat's Whiskers	October 7, 1923	Paul Terry	Pathé Exchange	Not Publicly Available	Featured a character with a striking resemblance to Felix the Cat.
126	The High Flyers	October 14, 1923	Paul Terry	Pathé Exchange	Not Publicly Available	
127	Aged In The Wood	October 21, 1923	Paul Terry	Pathé Exchange	Considered Lost	
128	The Circus	October 28, 1923	Unknown	Pathé Exchange	Missing Scenes.	Missing some scenes.
129	A Barnyard Rodeo	November 4, 1923	Paul Terry	Pathé Exchange	Not Publicly Available	Mistyped in magazines as "A Banyard Romeo".
130	Do Women Pay?	November 11, 1923	Paul Terry	Pathé Exchange	TV Release.	
131	Farmer Al Falfa's Pet Cat	November 18, 1923	Paul Terry	Pathé Exchange	Considered Lost	
132	Happy-Go-Luckies	November 25, 1923	Paul Terry	Pathé Exchange		
133	The Five Fifteen	December 2, 1923	Paul Terry	Pathé Exchange	Not Publicly Available	
134	The Dark Horse	December 9, 1923	Paul Terry	Pathé Exchange	Considered Lost	
135	The Cat Came Back	December 16, 1923	Paul Terry	Pathé Exchange	Not Publicly Available	
136	The Five Orphans Of The Storm	December 23, 1923	Paul Terry	Pathé Exchange	Castle Films 1937 Sound Reissue “Christmas Cartoon”.	Later reissued in Sound By Castle Films under the name "Christmas Cartoon".
137	The Best Man Wins	December 30, 1923	Unknown	Pathé Exchange	TV Release.	

=== 1924 ===
#	Title	Release Date	Director	Distributor	Film	Notes
138	The Good Old Days	January 6, 1924	Paul Terry	Pathé Exchange	Not Publicly Available	Often confused with later short "Good Old College Days". The production materials of this short survive at the Academy Collection.
139	The Animals' Fair	January 13, 1924	Unknown	Pathé Exchange	Not Publicly Available	Not to be confused with the 1931 short "The Animal Fair". Also known as “Animal Fair”.
140	The Black Sheep	January 20, 1924	Paul Terry	Pathé Exchange	Not Publicly Available	
141	The Morning After	January 27, 1924	Unknown	Pathé Exchange	Not Publicly Available	
142	The Rat's Revenge	February 3, 1924	Paul Terry	Pathé Exchange	Considered Lost	
143	Good Old College Days	February 10, 1924	Paul Terry	Pathé Exchange	Not Publicly Available	
144	A Rural Romance	February 17, 1924	Paul Terry	Pathé Exchange	Not Publicly Available	
145	Captain Kidder	February 24, 1924	Unknown	Pathé Exchange	TV Release.	
146	Herman, The Great Mouse	March 2, 1924	Unknown	Pathé Exchange		
147	All Star Cast	March 9, 1924	Paul Terry	Pathé Exchange	Not Publicly Available	
148	Why Mice Leave Home	March 16, 1924	Paul Terry	Pathé Exchange	Considered Lost	
149	From Rags to Riches and Back Again	March 23, 1924	Paul Terry	Pathé Exchange	TV Release.	Retitled "Money Mad" for TV release.
150	The Champion	March 30, 1924	Paul Terry	Pathé Exchange	Not Publicly Available	
151	Runnin' Wild	April 6, 1924	Paul Terry	Pathé Exchange	Not Publicly Available	Also known as “Running Wild”.
152	If Noah Lived Today	April 13, 1924	Unknown	Pathé Exchange	Cartoon Link	Retitled "Flying Ark" for TV release.
153	A Trip to the Pole	April 20, 1924	Paul Terry	Pathé Exchange	Not Publicly Available	
154	An Ideal Farm	April 27, 1924	Paul Terry	Pathé Exchange	Not Publicly Available	
155	Homeless Pups	May 4, 1924	Paul Terry	Pathé Exchange	Considered Lost	
156	When Winter Comes	May 11, 1924	Unknown	Pathé Exchange	TV Release.	
157	The Jealous Fisherman	May 18, 1924	Unknown	Pathé Exchange	Cartoon Link	
158	The Jolly Jail-Bird	May 25, 1924	Paul Terry	Pathé Exchange	Not Publicly Available	
159	One Good Turn Deserves Another	June 1, 1924	Paul Terry	Pathé Exchange	TV Release.	Retitled "A Friend In Need" for TV release.
160	The Flying Carpet	June 8, 1924	Paul Terry	Pathé Exchange	Not Publicly Available	
161	That Old Can Of Mine	June 15, 1924	Paul Terry	Pathé Exchange	Not Publicly Available	
162	The Organ Grinder	June 22, 1924	Paul Terry	Pathé Exchange	TV Release.	Retitled "Motorcycle Hero" for TV release.
163	Home Talent	June 29, 1924	Unknown	Pathé Exchange	Not Publicly Available	
164	The Body In The Bag	July 6, 1924	Paul Terry	Pathé Exchange	Not Publicly Available	
165	Desert Sheiks	July 13, 1924	Paul Terry	Pathé Exchange	Not Publicly Available	
166	A Woman's Honor	July 20, 1924	Paul Terry	Pathé Exchange	Considered Lost	
167	The Sport of Kings	July 27, 1924	Unknown	Pathé Exchange	Not Publicly Available	
168	Flying Fever	August 3, 1924	Paul Terry	Pathé Exchange	Not Publicly Available	
169	Amelia Comes Back	August 10, 1924	Paul Terry	Pathé Exchange	Considered Lost	
170	House Cleaning	August 17, 1924	Paul Terry	Pathé Exchange	Considered Lost	
171	The Prodigal Pup	August 24, 1924	Paul Terry	Pathé Exchange	Not Publicly Available	
172	A Message from the Sea	August 31, 1924	Paul Terry	Pathé Exchange	TV Release. Missing Scenes.	Retitled "Magic Boots" & "Black Magic" for TV release. Missing some scenes.
173	Barnyard Olympics	September 7, 1924	Unknown	Pathé Exchange	Missing Scenes.	Missing some scenes.
174	In The Good Old Summer Time	September 14, 1924	Paul Terry	Pathé Exchange	Considered Lost	
175	The Mouse That Turned	September 21, 1924	Unknown	Pathé Exchange	Not Publicly Available	
176	Hawks Of The Sea	September 28, 1924	Paul Terry	Pathé Exchange	Not Publicly Available	The production materials of this short survive at the Academy Collection.
177	Noah's Outing	October 5, 1924	Unknown	Pathé Exchange	Cartoon Link	
178	A Lighthouse By the Sea	October 12, 1924	Paul Terry	Pathé Exchange	Considered Lost	
179	Black Magic	October 19, 1924	Paul Terry	Pathé Exchange	Not Publicly Available	Not to be confused with the renamed TV release of "A Message from the Sea".
180	Monkey Business	October 26, 1924	Unknown	Pathé Exchange	Home Movie Release.	
181	The Cat and the Magnet	November 2, 1924	Unknown	Pathé Exchange	TV Release.	
182	Sharpshooters	November 9, 1924	Unknown	Pathé Exchange	Not Publicly Available	Not to be confused with the TV title of the 1923 film "The Mysterious Hat". The difference is that the title of that short film is plural and the TV release title is singular.
183	She Knew Her Man	November 16, 1924	Paul Terry	Pathé Exchange	Considered Lost	
184	Good Old Circus Days	November 23, 1924	Unknown	Pathé Exchange	Not Publicly Available	
185	Lumber Jacks	November 30, 1924	Paul Terry	Pathé Exchange	Not Publicly Available (In Original Silent Form)	Later reissued with sound in 1929 under the name "Wood Choppers".
186	She's In Again	December 7, 1924	Unknown	Pathé Exchange	TV Release.	
187	Noah's Athletic Club	December 14, 1924	Paul Terry	Pathé Exchange	Considered Lost	
188	Mysteries Of Old Chinatown	December 21, 1924	Paul Terry	Pathé Exchange	Considered Lost	
189	Down on the Farm	December 28, 1924	Paul Terry	Pathé Exchange	Not Publicly Available	

=== 1925 ===
#	Title	Release Date	Director	Distributor	Film	Notes
190	On The Ice	January 4, 1925	Frank Moser	Pathé Exchange	TV Release.	Retitled "Cracked Ice" for TV release. Not to be confused with the 1928 short of the same name.
191	One Game Pup	January 11, 1925	Unknown	Pathé Exchange	Considered Lost	
192	African Huntsmen	January 18, 1925	Unknown	Pathé Exchange	Not Publicly Available	Sometimes titled “African Huntsman”.
193	Hold That Thought	January 25, 1925	Paul Terry	Pathé Exchange		Reissued with sound in 1929 under the name "Concentrate".
194	Biting The Dust	February 1, 1925	Unknown	Pathé Exchange	Not Publicly Available	
195	A Transatlantic Flight	February 8, 1925	Paul Terry	Pathé Exchange	Not Publicly Available	
196	Bigger And Better Jails	February 15, 1925	Paul Terry	Pathé Exchange	Not Publicly Available (In Original Silent Form)	Reissued with sound in 1929 under the name "The Jail Breakers".
197	Fisherman's Luck	February 22, 1925	Paul Terry	Pathé Exchange	Not Publicly Available	
198	Clean Up Week	March 1, 1925	Paul Terry	Pathé Exchange	Not Publicly Available (In Original Silent Form)	Reissued with sound in 1929 under the name "House Cleaning Time".
199	In Dutch	March 8, 1925	Unknown	Pathé Exchange	TV Release.	Retitled "Wooden Shoes" for TV release.
200	Jungle Bike Riders	March 15, 1925	Unknown	Pathé Exchange	Not Publicly Available	
201	The Pie Man	March 22, 1925	Paul Terry	Pathé Exchange	Not Publicly Available (In Original Silent Form)	Reissued with sound in 1929 under the name "Custard Pies".
202	At The Zoo	March 29, 1925	Paul Terry	Pathé Exchange	Not Publicly Available	
203	The Housing Shortage	April 5, 1925	Paul Terry	Pathé Exchange	Not Publicly Available	
204	S.O.S.	April 12, 1925	Paul Terry	Pathé Exchange	Not Publicly Available	
205	The Adventures Of Adenoid	April 19, 1925	Unknown	Pathé Exchange	Home Movie Release.	
206	Deep Stuff	April 26, 1925	Paul Terry	Pathé Exchange	Not Publicly Available	
207	Permanent Waves	May 3, 1925	Paul Terry	Pathé Exchange	Not Publicly Available	
208	Darkest Africa	May 10, 1925	Paul Terry	Pathé Exchange	Not Publicly Available	
209	A Fast Worker	May 17, 1925	Paul Terry	Pathé Exchange	Not Publicly Available	
210	Echoes from the Alps	May 24, 1925	Paul Terry	Pathé Exchange	Not Publicly Available	
211	Hot Times in Iceland	May 31, 1925		Pathé Exchange		
212	The Runt	June 7, 1925	Paul Terry	Pathé Exchange	Not Publicly Available	
213	The End of the World	June 14, 1925	Paul Terry	Pathé Exchange	Not Publicly Available (In Original Silent Form)	Reissued with sound in 1929 under the name "The Big Scare".
214	Runaway Balloon	June 21, 1925	Paul Terry	Pathé Exchange	Not Publicly Available	
215	Office Help	June 28, 1925	Paul Terry	Pathé Exchange		
216	Wine, Women And Song	July 5, 1925	Unknown	Pathé Exchange	TV Release.	Retitled "A Cat's Life" & "A Day's Outing" for TV release.
217	When Men Were Men	July 12, 1925	Paul Terry	Pathé Exchange	Not Publicly Available (In Original Silent Form)	Reissued with sound in 1929 under the name "A Stone Age Romance".
218	For the Love of a Gal	July 19, 1925	Paul Terry	Pathé Exchange	Not Publicly Available	
219	Bugville Field Day	July 26, 1925	Paul Terry	Pathé Exchange	Not Publicly Available (In Original Silent Form)	Reissued with sound in 1929 under the name "Bughouse College Days".
220	A Yarn About Yarn	August 2, 1925	Paul Terry	Pathé Exchange	Not Publicly Available	
221	Bubbles	August 9, 1925	Frank Moser & Paul Terry	Pathé Exchange	TV Release.	
221	Soap	August 16, 1925	Paul Terry	Pathé Exchange	Not Publicly Available	
222	Over The Plate	August 23, 1925	Unknown	Pathé Exchange	Not Publicly Available	
223	The Window Washers	August 30, 1925	Paul Terry	Pathé Exchange	TV Release.	
224	Barnyard Follies	September 6, 1925	Paul Terry	Pathé Exchange	Not Publicly Available	
225	The Ugly Duckling	September 13, 1925	Paul Terry	Pathé Exchange	TV Release.	
226	Nuts And Squirrels	September 20, 1925	Paul Terry	Pathé Exchange	Considered Lost	
227	Hungry Hounds	September 27, 1925	Unknown	Pathé Exchange		
228	The Lion and the Monkey	October 4, 1925	Paul Terry	Pathé Exchange	Not Publicly Available	
229	The Hero Wins	October 11, 1925	Paul Terry	Pathé Exchange	TV Release.	Retitled "Mouse's Tale" for TV release.
230	Air-Cooled	October 18, 1925	Paul Terry	Pathé Exchange	Not Publicly Available	
231	Closer Than A Brother	October 25, 1925	Paul Terry	Pathé Exchange	TV Release.	Not to be confused with the TV title of the 1926 cartoon “Scrambled Eggs”.
232	Wildcats Of Paris	November 1, 1925	Paul Terry	Pathé Exchange	Not Publicly Available	
233	The Honor System	November 8, 1925	Paul Terry	Pathé Exchange	Not Publicly Available	
234	More Mice Than Brains	November 15, 1925		Pathé Exchange	TV Release.	
235	The Great Open Spaces	November 22, 1925	Paul Terry	Pathé Exchange	TV Release.	Retitled "The Wild West" for TV release.
236	A Day's Outing	November 29, 1925	Paul Terry	Pathé Exchange	Not Publicly Available	
237	The Bonehead Age	December 6, 1925	Paul Terry	Pathé Exchange	Not Publicly Available	
238	The Haunted House	December 13, 1925	Paul Terry	Pathé Exchange	Not Publicly Available	
239	The English Channel Swim	December 20, 1925	Paul Terry	Pathé Exchange	TV Release.	Not Publicly Available
240	Noah And His Troubles	December 27, 1925	Paul Terry	Pathé Exchange	Considered Lost	Mistyped in magazines as "Noah And His Trousers".

=== 1926 ===
#	Title	Release Date	Director	Distributor	Film	Notes
241	The Gold Push	January 3, 1926	Paul Terry	Pathé Exchange	TV Release.	Retitled "Gold Rush" for TV release.
242	Three Blind Mice	January 10, 1926	Paul Terry	Pathé Exchange	Not Publicly Available	
243	Lighter Than Air	January 17, 1926	Paul Terry	Pathé Exchange	Considered Lost	
244	The Little Brown Jug	January 24, 1926	Unknown	Pathé Exchange	Not Publicly Available	
245	A June Bride	January 31, 1926	Paul Terry	Pathé Exchange	Considered Lost	
246	The Wind Jammers	February 7, 1926	Paul Terry & Mannie Davis	Pathé Exchange	TV Release.	Sometimes spelled as “The Windjammers”.
247	Hunting In 1950	February 14, 1926	Frank Moser & Paul Terry	Pathé Exchange	TV Release.	
248	The Wicked City	February 21, 1926	Frank Moser & Paul Terry	Pathé Exchange	TV Release.	Retitled "Our Hero" for TV release.
249	The Mail Coach	February 28, 1926	Unknown	Pathé Exchange	Not Publicly Available	
250	Spanish Love	March 7, 1926	Paul Terry & Harry Bailey	Pathé Exchange		
251	The Fire Fighter	March 14, 1926	Paul Terry	Pathé Exchange	Not Publicly Available	Also known as "Fire Fighters".
252	Up in the Air	March 21, 1926	Frank Moser & Paul Terry	Pathé Exchange	Cartoon Link	
253	Fly Time	March 28, 1926	Paul Terry	Pathé Exchange	Considered Lost	
254	The Merry Blacksmith	April 4, 1926	Paul Terry	Pathé Exchange	Considered Lost	
255	The Big Hearted Fish	April 11, 1926	Unknown	Pathé Exchange	Not Publicly Available	
256	Hearts And Showers	April 18, 1926	Paul Terry	Pathé Exchange	Considered Lost	
257	Rough And Ready Romeo	April 25, 1926	Paul Terry	Pathé Exchange	Not Publicly Available	
258	Farm Hands	May 2, 1926	Paul Terry	Pathé Exchange	Not Publicly Available	
259	The Shootin' Fool	May 9, 1926	Paul Terry	Pathé Exchange	Considered Lost	Also known as “The Shooting Fool”.
260	The Alpine Flapper	May 16, 1926	Paul Terry	Pathé Exchange	Not Publicly Available	Also known as "An Alpine Flapper".
261	Liquid Dynamite	May 23, 1926	Paul Terry	Pathé Exchange	Considered Lost	
262	A Bumper Crop	May 30, 1926	Unknown	Pathé Exchange	Not Publicly Available	
263	The Big Retreat	June 6, 1926	Paul Terry & John Foster	Pathé Exchange	TV Release.	Retitled "Soldiers Of Fortune" for TV release.
264	The Little Parade	June 13, 1926	Frank Moser & Paul Terry	Pathé Exchange	TV Release.	
265	The Land Boom	June 20, 1926	Paul Terry & Harry Bailey	Pathé Exchange	TV Release.	
266	A Plumber's Life	June 27, 1926	Paul Terry	Pathé Exchange	Considered Lost	
267	Jungle Sports	July 4, 1926	Paul Terry & Jerry Shields	Pathé Exchange	Not Publicly Available	Retitled "Monkey Shines" for TV release.
268	Chop Suey and Noodles	July 11, 1926	Paul Terry & John Foster	Pathé Exchange	Not Publicly Available	Retitled "China Doll" for TV release.
269	Pirates Bold	July 18, 1926	Frank Moser & Paul Terry	Pathé Exchange	Home Movie Release. Missing Scenes.	Missing some scenes.
270	Her Ben	July 25, 1926	Harry Bailey	Pathé Exchange	Cartoon Link	Retitled "Dog Catcher" for TV release.
271	Venus of Venice	August 1, 1926	Paul Terry	Pathé Exchange	Not Publicly Available	
272	Dough Boys	August 8, 1926	Paul Terry & Jerry Shields	Pathé Exchange	Cartoon Link	
273	The Last Ha-Ha	August 15, 1926	Paul Terry & John Foster	Pathé Exchange	TV Release.	
275	Scrambled Eggs	August 22, 1926	Paul Terry, Frank Moser, & Bill Tytla	Pathé Exchange	TV Release.	Retitled "Closer Than A Brother" for TV release. Not to be confused with the 1925 short of the same name.
276	A Knight Out	August 29, 1926	Paul Terry & Harry Bailey	Pathé Exchange	TV Release.	Also known as "Knights Out".
277	Pests	September 5, 1926	Jerry Shields	Pathé Exchange	TV Release.	
278	A Buggy Ride	September 12, 1926	Paul Terry & Mannie Davis	Pathé Exchange	TV Release.	Retitled "The Wicked King" for TV release.
279	The Charleston Queen	September 19, 1926	Paul Terry	Pathé Exchange	Not Publicly Available	
280	Watered Stock	September 26, 1926	Paul Terry & John Foster	Pathé Exchange	TV Release.	
281	Why Argue?	October 3, 1926	Paul Terry & Harry Bailey	Pathé Exchange	TV Release.	Retitled "Don't Get Excited" for TV release.
282	The Road House	October 10, 1926	Paul Terry	Pathé Exchange	Not Publicly Available	
283	The Phoney Express	October 17, 1926	Paul Terry	Pathé Exchange	TV Release.	
284	Gun Shy	October 24, 1926	Paul Terry	Pathé Exchange	Not Publicly Available	
285	Home Sweet Home	October 31, 1926	Paul Terry	Pathé Exchange	Not Publicly Available	
287	Through Thick and Thin	November 7, 1926	Paul Terry & Harry Bailey	Pathé Exchange	TV Release.	Retitled "Playmates" for TV release.
288	In Vaudeville	November 14, 1926	Paul Terry & Mannie Davis	Pathé Exchange	TV Release.	
289	Radio Controlled	November 21, 1926	Frank Moser & Paul Terry	Pathé Exchange	TV Release.	
290	Buck Fever	November 28, 1926	Paul Terry	Pathé Exchange	Not Publicly Available	
291	Hitting The Rails	December 5, 1926	Paul Terry & John Foster	Pathé Exchange	Not Publicly Available	
292	Bars And Stripes	December 12, 1926	Paul Terry	Pathé Exchange	Not Publicly Available	
293	School Days	December 19, 1926	Paul Terry & Mannie Davis	Pathé Exchange	TV Release. Missing Scenes.	Only around half of the cartoon is publicly available.
294	Where Friendship Ceases	December 26, 1926	Frank Moser & Paul Terry	Pathé Exchange	TV Release.	

=== 1927 ===
#	Title	Release Date	Director	Distributor	Film	Notes
295	The Musical Parrot	January 2, 1927	Paul Terry	Pathé Exchange	Not Publicly Available	
296	Sink or Swim	January 9, 1927	Paul Terry	Pathé Exchange	Considered Lost	
297	Chasing Rainbows	January 16, 1927	Unknown	Pathé Exchange	Not Publicly Available	
298	The Plow Boy's Revenge	January 23, 1927	Paul Terry & John Foster	Pathé Exchange	Home Movie Release.	Sometimes titled "Plowboy's Revenge".
299	Tit For Tat	January 30, 1927	Unknown	Pathé Exchange	Not Publicly Available	
300	In The Rough	February 6, 1927	Paul Terry & Jerry Shields	Pathé Exchange	Not Publicly Available	Mistyped in magazines as "In The Dough".
301	The Crawl Stroke Kid	February 13, 1927	Paul Terry	Pathé Exchange	Considered Lost	
302	The Mail Pilot	February 20, 1927	Paul Terry & Harry Bailey	Pathé Exchange	Not Publicly Available In Its Original B&W Form.	Redrawn with color in the 1970s. Not to be confused with the 1933 Mickey Mouse short of the same name.
303	Cracked Ice	February 27, 1927	Paul Terry & Mannie Davis	Pathé Exchange	Not Publicly Available (In Original Silent Form)	Reissued with sound in 1929 under the name "Skating Hounds".
304	Taking The Air	March 6, 1927	Paul Terry	Pathé Exchange	Not Publicly Available	
305	All For A Bride	March 13, 1927	Paul Terry	Pathé Exchange	Not Publicly Available	
306	The Magician	March 20, 1927	Frank Moser & Paul Terry	Pathé Exchange		Reissued with sound in 1929 under the name "Presto Chango".
307	Keep Off the Grass	March 27, 1927	Paul Terry & Harry Bailey	Pathé Exchange	TV Release.	Retitled "A Day At The Park" for TV release.
308	The Medicine Man	April 3, 1927	Paul Terry	Pathé Exchange	Not Publicly Available	
309	The Honor Man	April 10, 1927	Paul Terry & John Foster	Pathé Exchange	TV Release.	Retitled "Short Vacation" for TV release.
310	Anti-Fat	April 17, 1927	Frank Moser & Paul Terry	Pathé Exchange	TV Release.	
311	The Pie-Eyed Piper	April 24, 1927	Paul Terry	Pathé Exchange	Not Publicly Available	
312	The Fair Exchange	May 1, 1927	Unknown	Pathé Exchange	Not Publicly Available	
313	Bubbling Over	May 8, 1927	Paul Terry	Pathé Exchange	Not Publicly Available	
314	When the Snow Flies	May 15, 1927	Paul Terry & John Foster	Pathé Exchange	Cartoon Link	Missing some scenes.
315	Horses, Horses, Horses	May 22, 1927	Paul Terry	Pathé Exchange	Not Publicly Available	
316	Digging For Gold	May 29, 1927	Unknown	Pathé Exchange	Not Publicly Available	
317	A Dog's Day	June 5, 1927	Paul Terry	Pathé Exchange	Not Publicly Available (In Original Silent Form)	Reissued with sound in 1929 under the name "The Faithful Pup".
318	Hard Cider	June 12, 1927	Unknown	Pathé Exchange		
319	Died In The Wool	June 19, 1927	Unknown	Pathé Exchange	Not Publicly Available	
320	A One Man Dog	June 26, 1927	Frank Moser & Paul Terry	Pathé Exchange	TV Release. Missing Scenes.	Missing some scenes.
321	The Big Reward	July 3, 1927	Paul Terry & Harry Bailey	Pathé Exchange	Missing Scenes.	Only exists as a cutdown of the cartoon.
322	Riding High	July 10, 1927	Unknown	Pathé Exchange	Not Publicly Available	
323	The Love Nest	July 17, 1927	Paul Terry	Pathé Exchange	Not Publicly Available	
324	Subway Sally	July 24, 1927	Paul Terry & Frank Moser	Pathé Exchange		
325	The Bully	July 31, 1927	Paul Terry	Pathé Exchange	Considered Lost	
327	Ant Life as It Isn't	August 7, 1927	Paul Terry	Pathé Exchange	Not Publicly Available	
328	Red Hot Sands	August 14, 1927	Paul Terry & Mannie Davis	Pathé Exchange	TV Release.	Also known as "Red Hot Sand".
329	A Hole in One	August 21, 1927	Paul Terry & John Foster	Pathé Exchange	TV Release.	
330	Hook, Line and Sinker	August 28, 1927	Frank Moser & Paul Terry	Pathé Exchange	TV Release.	
331	Small Town Sheriff	September 4, 1927	Harry Bailey, John Foster, Frank Moser, & Jerry Shields	Pathé Exchange		Retitled "Space Trip" for TV release.
332	Cutting A Melon	September 11, 1927	Paul Terry	Pathé Exchange	Not Publicly Available	
333	In Again, Out Again	September 18, 1927	Unknown	Pathé Exchange	Not Publicly Available	
334	The Human Fly	September 25, 1927	Paul Terry	Pathé Exchange	Not Publicly Available	
335	The River Of Doubt	October 2, 1927	Frank Moser & Paul Terry	Pathé Exchange	TV Release.	
336	All Bull and a Yard Wide	October 9, 1927	Paul Terry & Harry Bailey	Pathé Exchange	TV Release.	Retitled "On The Air" for TV release.
337	Lindy's Cat	October 16, 1927	Paul Terry & Mannie Davis	Pathé Exchange	TV Release. Missing Scenes.	Missing some scenes.
338	The Big Tent	October 23, 1927	Frank Moser & Paul Terry	Pathé Exchange	TV Release.	Retitled "Stars Of The Circus" for TV release.
339	A Brave Heart	October 30, 1927	Paul Terry	Pathé Exchange	Considered Lost	
340	Signs of Spring	November 6, 1927	Paul Terry & Jerry Shields	Pathé Exchange	Cartoon Link	
341	Saved By A Keyhole	November 13, 1927	Paul Terry	Pathé Exchange	Not Publicly Available	
342	The Fox Hunt	November 20, 1927	Unknown	Pathé Exchange	Not Publicly Available	
343	Flying Fishers	November 27, 1927	Paul Terry	Pathé Exchange	Not Publicly Available	
344	Carnival Week	December 4, 1927	Paul Terry & John Foster	Pathé Exchange	Not Publicly Available	
345	Rats In His Garret	December 11, 1927	Paul Terry & Jerry Shields	Pathé Exchange		
346	Christmas Cheer	December 18, 1927	Paul Terry & John Foster	Pathé Exchange	Not Publicly Available	
347	The Junkman	December 25, 1927	Paul Terry & Mannie Davis	Pathé Exchange		Retitled "Magnetized" for TV release.

=== 1928 ===
#	Title	Release Date	Director	Distributor	Film	Notes
348	The Broncho Buster	January 1, 1928	Unknown	Pathé Exchange	TV Release. Missing Scenes.	Missing some scenes.
349	A Short Circuit	January 8, 1928	Unknown	Pathé Exchange	TV Release.	Also known as "Short Circuit".
350	High Stakes	January 15, 1928	Paul Terry & Jerry Shields	Pathé Exchange	TV Release.	
351	The Boy Friend	January 22, 1928	Paul Terry & Harry Bailey	Pathé Exchange	Not Publicly Available	
352	The Wandering Minstrel	January 29, 1928	Paul Terry & Harry Bailey	Pathé Exchange	Not Publicly Available	
353	The Good Ship Nellie	February 5, 1928	Paul Terry & Frank Moser	Pathé Exchange	TV Release.	Retitled "Ship Ahoy" for TV release. Not to be confused with the 1930 short of the same name.
354	Everybody's Flying	February 12, 1928	John Foster	Pathé Exchange	Cartoon Link	Also known as "The Animal Aviators". Missing some scenes.
355	The Spider's Lair	February 19, 1928	Paul Terry & Mannie Davis	Pathé Exchange		
356	A Blaze Of Glory	February 26, 1928	Paul Terry & Mannie Davis	Pathé Exchange	Not Publicly Available	
357	The County Fair	March 4, 1928	Paul Terry & Harry Bailey	Pathé Exchange	Not Publicly Available	
358	On The Ice	March 11, 1928	Paul Terry & Frank Moser	Pathé Exchange	Not Publicly Available	
360	The Son Shower	March 18, 1928	Paul Terry	Pathé Exchange	Considered Lost	Also known as "The Sea Shower".
361	Jungle Days	March 25, 1928	Unknown	Pathé Exchange		
362	Scaling the Alps	April 1, 1928	Unknown	Pathé Exchange		
364	Barnyard Lodge No. 1	April 8, 1928	Paul Terry & Frank Moser	Pathé Exchange	Not Publicly Available	
365	A Battling Duet	April 15, 1928	Unknown	Pathé Exchange	Not Publicly Available	
366	The Flying Age	April 22, 1928	Paul Terry & John Foster	Pathé Exchange	Not Publicly Available	
367	Barnyard Artists	April 29, 1928	Paul Terry & Jerry Shields	Pathé Exchange	Cartoon Link	
368	A Jungle Triangle	May 6, 1928	Paul Terry & Mannie Davis	Pathé Exchange	Not Publicly Available	
369	Coast To Coast	May 13, 1928	Frank Moser	Pathé Exchange		Also known as "Koast To Koast".
370	The War Bride	May 20, 1928	Paul Terry	Pathé Exchange	TV Release.	Retitled "In The Army" for TV release.
371	Happy Days	May 27, 1928	Unknown	Pathé Exchange	Not Publicly Available	
372	The Flight That Failed	June 3, 1928	Unknown	Pathé Exchange	Not Publicly Available	
373	Puppy Love	June 10, 1928	Paul Terry & Mannie Davis	Pathé Exchange	TV Release.	
374	Ride 'Em Cowboy	June 17, 1928	Paul Terry & Frank Moser	Pathé Exchange	Not Publicly Available	
375	The Mouse's Bride	June 24, 1928	Unknown	Pathé Exchange	TV Release.	
376	City Slickers	July 1, 1928	Harry Bailey	Pathé Exchange	Cartoon Link	Missing some scenes.
377	The Huntsman	July 8, 1928	Paul Terry & Frank Moser	Pathé Exchange	TV Release.	
378	The Baby Show	July 15, 1928	Unknown	Pathé Exchange	This Print Has The Wrong Title Card. Missing Scenes.	Missing some scenes.
379	The Early Bird	July 22, 1928	Paul Terry & John Foster	Pathé Exchange	Not Publicly Available	
380	Outnumbered	July 29, 1928	Paul Terry & Jerry Shields	Pathé Exchange	Not Publicly Available	
381	Our Little Nell	August 5, 1928	Unknown	Pathé Exchange	Not Publicly Available	
382	Sunny Italy	August 12, 1928	Paul Terry & Mannie Davis	Pathé Exchange	TV Release.	
383	A Cross-Country Run	August 19, 1928	Paul Terry & Harry Bailey	Pathé Exchange	Considered Lost	
384	In The Bag	August 26, 1928	Unknown	Pathé Exchange	TV Release.	Retitled "The Picnic" for TV release.
385	Static	September 2, 1928	Unknown	Pathé Exchange	Cartoon Link	
386	Alaska Or Bust	September 9, 1928	Paul Terry & Frank Moser	Pathé Exchange	Not Publicly Available	
387	Sunday on the Farm	September 16, 1928	Paul Terry & John Foster	Pathé Exchange	TV Release.	
388	High Seas	September 23, 1928	Mannie Davis	Pathé Exchange	Missing Scenes.	Missing some scenes.
390	The Magnetic Bat	September 30, 1928	Paul Terry	Pathé Exchange	Not Publicly Available In Its Original B&W Form.	Retitled "Batter Up" for TV release.
391	Cure or Kill	October 7, 1928	Jerry Shields	Pathé Exchange	This Print Has The Wrong Title Card.	Also known as "Kill or Cure".
392	Dinner Time	October 14, 1928	Paul Terry & John Foster	Pathé Exchange	The First Aesop Fable Sound Cartoon.	First Van Beuren sound cartoon. Released one month before Steamboat Willie.
393	Monkey Love	October 14, 1928	Paul Terry & Mannie Davis	Pathé Exchange	Not Publicly Available	Released the same day as Dinner Time. The first instance of two Aesop Fable cartoons releasing on the same day.
394	The Big Game	October 21, 1928	Paul Terry & Harry Bailey	Pathé Exchange	Cartoon Link	Retitled "Grampus And Scrappy” for TV release. Later redrawn colorized in the 1970s.
395	Gridiron Demons	October 28, 1928	Paul Terry & Frank Moser	Pathé Exchange	Cartoon Link	
396	The Laundry Man	November 4, 1928	Paul Terry	Pathé Exchange	Not Available Online	
397	Caught In A Draft	November 11, 1928	Unknown	Pathé Exchange	Not Publicly Available	
398	A Polar Flight	November 18, 1928	Paul Terry	Pathé Exchange	Considered Lost	
399	On the Links	November 25, 1928	Unknown	Pathé Exchange	TV Release.	
400	The Fishing Fool	December 2, 1928	Paul Terry & Frank Moser	Pathé Exchange		
401	A Day Off	December 9, 1928	Paul Terry & John Foster	Pathé Exchange	Missing Scenes.	Missing some scenes.
402	Barnyard Politics	December 16, 1928	Paul Terry	Pathé Exchange		
403	Stage Struck	December 23, 1928	Paul Terry & John Foster	Pathé Exchange		The 2nd sound Aesop Fable cartoon released. Was once considered lost but has since been found.
404	Flying Hoofs	December 23, 1928	Unknown	Pathé Exchange	Missing Scenes.	Missing some scenes.
405	The Mail Man	December 30, 1928	Paul Terry & Mannie Davis	Pathé Exchange	TV Release.	

=== 1929 ===
#	Title	Release Date	Director	Distributor	Film	Notes
406	Land O' Cotton	January 6, 1929	Paul Terry & Frank Moser	Pathé Exchange		
407	A White Elephant	January 13, 1929	Paul Terry & Jerry Shields	Pathé Exchange	TV Release.	Also known as "The White Elephant".
408	Snapping the Whip	January 20, 1929	Paul Terry & Frank Moser	Pathé Exchange	TV Release.	Retitled "Roller Skates" for TV release.
409	The Break of the Day	January 27, 1929	Paul Terry & Mannie Davis	Pathé Exchange		
410	Sweet Adeline	February 3, 1929	Paul Terry & Frank Moser	Pathé Exchange	Not Publicly Available	
411	Wooden Money	February 10, 1929	Paul Terry & John Foster	Pathé Exchange	TV Release.	
412	The Queen Bee	February 17, 1929	Paul Terry & Jerry Shields	Pathé Exchange	Not Publicly Available	
413	Grandma's House	February 24, 1929	Paul Terry	Pathé Exchange	Not Publicly Available	
414	Back To The Soil	March 3, 1929	Paul Terry	Pathé Exchange	Not Publicly Available	
415	A Lad and His Lamp	March 10, 1929	Paul Terry	Pathé Exchange	TV Release.	
416	The Black Duck	March 17, 1929	Paul Terry	Pathé Exchange	TV Release.	
417	The Big Burg	March 24, 1929	Paul Terry & Frank Moser	Pathé Exchange	Sound Version Unavailable.	Sound reissue.
418	The Under Dog	March 31, 1929	Unknown	Pathé Exchange	Home Movie Cutdown.	Redrawn colorized in the 1970s.
419	The Cop's Bride	April 7, 1929	Paul Terry	Pathé Exchange	TV Release. Missing Scenes.	Only a fragment is publicly available.
420	Presto Chango	April 14, 1929	Paul Terry	Pathé Exchange		A sound reissue of the 1927 short "The Magician".
421	The Water Cure	April 14, 1929	Paul Terry	Pathé Exchange		Released on the same day as the short "Presto Chango".
422	The Big Shot	April 21, 1929	Paul Terry	Pathé Exchange	Not Publicly Available	
423	The Fight Game	April 26, 1929	John Foster, Harry Bailey, & Frank Moser	Pathé Exchange	Not Publicly Available	
424	Homeless Cats	April 26, 1929	Paul Terry	Pathé Exchange	Not Publicly Available	Released on the same day as the short "The Fight Game".
425	Skating Hounds	April 28, 1929	Paul Terry & Mannie Davis	Pathé Exchange		Sound reissue of 1927 short "Cracked Ice".
426	The Little Game Hunter	May 5, 1929	John Foster, Harry Bailey, & Frank Moser	Pathé Exchange	Cartoon Link	Missing scenes.
427	The Faithful Pup	May 12, 1929	Paul Terry	Pathé Exchange		Sound reissue of 1927 short "A Dog's Day".
428	The Ball Park	May 19, 1929	Paul Terry	Pathé Exchange	TV Release.	
429	Custard Pies	May 26, 1929	Paul Terry	Pathé Exchange		Sound reissue of 1925 short "The Pie Man".
430	Fish Day	May 26, 1929	Paul Terry	Pathé Exchange	Not Publicly Available	Released on the same day as "Custard Pies".
432	The Polo Match	June 2, 1929	Paul Terry	Pathé Exchange	Not Publicly Available (In Original Silent Form)	Reissued with sound in 1932 under the name "Happy Polo".
433	Wood Choppers	June 9, 1929	Paul Terry	Pathé Exchange		Re-edited sound reissue of 1924 short "Lumber Jacks".
434	Snow Birds	June 9, 1929	John Foster, Harry Bailey, & Frank Moser	Pathé Exchange		Released on the same day as "Wood Choppers".
435	April Showers	June 16, 1929	Paul Terry	Pathé Exchange	Not Publicly Available	
436	Concentrate	June 23, 1929	Paul Terry	Pathé Exchange		Re-edited sound reissue of 1925 short "Hold That Thought".
437	Kidnapped	June 23, 1929	Paul Terry	Pathé Exchange	Not Publicly Available	Released on the same day as "Concentrate".
438	In His Cups	June 30, 1929	Paul Terry	Pathé Exchange	Not Publicly Available	
459	The Jail Breakers	July 7, 1929	Paul Terry	Pathé Exchange		
460	Cold Steel	July 7, 1929	John Foster, Harry Bailey, & Frank Moser	Pathé Exchange	Not Publicly Available	
461	The Farmer's Goat	July 14, 1929	Paul Terry & John Foster	Pathé Exchange	Not Publicly Available	
462	House Cleaning Time	July 21, 1929	Paul Terry	Pathé Exchange		Sound reissue of 1925 short "Clean Up Week".
463	By Land And Air	July 21, 1929	John Foster	Pathé Exchange	Not Publicly Available	Released on the same day as "House Cleaning Time".
464	A Midsummer's Day Dream	July 28, 1929	Unknown	Pathé Exchange	Silent Cartoon Fragments (Sound Version Lost).	Retitled "Day Dream" for TV release. Was both released in silent and sound forms.
465	Bughouse College Days	August 4, 1929	Paul Terry	Pathé Exchange		Sound reissue of 1925 short "Bugville Field Day".
466	Three Game Guys	August 4, 1929	Paul Terry	Pathé Exchange	Cartoon Link	Released on the same day as "Bughouse College Days".
467	The Enchanted Flute	August 11, 1929	John Foster, Harry Bailey, & Frank Moser	Pathé Exchange	Not Publicly Available	
468	A Stone Age Romance	August 18, 1929	Paul Terry	Pathé Exchange	TV Release.	Sound reissue of 1925 short "When Men Were Men".
469	Wash Day	August 18, 1929	Mannie Davis	Pathé Exchange	Not Publicly Available	
470	The Cabaret	August 25, 1929	Paul Terry & Frank Moser	Pathé Exchange	Not Publicly Available	The last exclusive silent film made by Paul Terry.
471	The Fruitful Farm	September 1, 1929	Paul Terry & John Foster	Pathé Exchange	Considered Lost	
472	The Big Scare	September 1, 1929	Paul Terry	Pathé Exchange	With Reissue Titles.	Sound reissue of 1925 short "The End Of The World". Last Aesop Fable cartoon made by Paul Terry.
473	The Jungle Fool	September 15, 1929	Mannie Davis & John Foster	Pathé Exchange	TV Release.	The first cartoon branded as Aesop Sound Fables, though silent Film Fables were still distributed until 1930.
474	The Fly's Bride	September 29, 1929	Harry Bailey & John Foster	Pathé Exchange		
475	Summertime	October 11, 1929	John Foster	Pathé Exchange		
476	The Mill Pond	October 18, 1929	John Foster	Pathé Exchange		
477	The Barnyard Melody	November 1, 1929	Mannie Davis & John Foster	Pathé Exchange		Retitled "Music Hath Charms" for TV release. Not to be confused with the 1936 Oswald short of the same name.
478	Tuning In	November 10, 1929	Unknown	Pathé Exchange		Redrawn colorized in the 1970s.
479	The Night Club	November 24, 1929	Mannie Davis & John Foster	Pathé Exchange		
480	A Close Call	December 1, 1929	Harry Bailey & John Foster	Pathé Exchange		The first Milton and Rita cartoon that was based on Mickey Mouse.

=== 1930 ===
#	Title	Release Date	Director	Distributor	Film	Notes
481	Ship Ahoy	January 5, 1930	John Foster & Mannie Davis	Pathé Exchange		This cartoon’s sound was once considered lost, but has since been found.
482	The Iron Man	January 19, 1930	John Foster & Harry Bailey	Pathé Exchange		
483	Singing Saps	February 2, 1930	John Foster & Mannie Davis	Pathé Exchange		Not to be confused with the Oswald short "The Singing Sap", released the same year.
484	Sky Skippers	February 16, 1930	John Foster & Harry Bailey	Pathé Exchange		
485	Good Old Schooldays	March 2, 1930	John Foster & Mannie Davis	Pathé Exchange		
486	Dixie Days	March 9, 1930	John Foster & Mannie Davis	Pathé Exchange		Retitled "Uncle Tom And Little Eva" by Official Films for home movie release.
487	Foolish Follies	March 16, 1930	John Foster & Harry Bailey	Pathé Exchange		
488	Western Whoopee	April 13, 1930	John Foster & Harry Bailey	Pathé Exchange		
489	The Haunted Ship	April 27, 1930	John Foster, Harry Bailey, & Mannie Davis	Pathé Exchange		The first cartoon to feature Waffles and Don, who would continue making appearances until 1932.
490	Oom Pah Pah	May 11, 1930	John Foster & Harry Bailey	Pathé Exchange	With Spanish Titles.	
491	Noah Knew His Ark	May 25, 1930	John Foster & Mannie Davis	Pathé Exchange		Released by Official Films for home movie release.
492	A Bugville Romance	June 8, 1930	John Foster & Harry Bailey	Pathé Exchange		The last Van Beuren cartoon to have a silent version for it.
493	A Romeo Robin	June 22, 1930	John Foster & Mannie Davis	Pathé Exchange		
494	Jungle Jazz	July 6, 1930	John Foster & Harry Bailey	Pathé Exchange		
495	Snow Time	July 20, 1930	John Foster & Mannie Davis	Pathé Exchange		
496	Hot Tamale	August 3, 1930	John Foster	Pathé Exchange		Features Milton & Rita Mouse.
497	Laundry Blues	August 17, 1930	John Foster & Mannie Davis	Pathé Exchange		
498	Frozen Frolics	August 31, 1930	John Foster & Harry Bailey	Pathé Exchange		Features Waffles and Don.
499	Farm Foolery	September 14, 1930	John Foster	Pathé Exchange		Not to be confused with the 1949 Paramount cartoon of the same name.
500	Circus Capers	September 28, 1930	John Foster & Harry Bailey	Pathé Exchange		Features Milton & Rita Mouse.
501	Midnight	October 12, 1930	John Foster & Mannie Davis	Pathé Exchange		
502	The Big Cheese	October 26, 1930	John Foster	Pathé Exchange		
503	Gypped in Egypt	November 9, 1930	John Foster & Mannie Davis	Pathé Exchange		Features Waffles and Don.
504	The Office Boy	November 23, 1930	John Foster & Harry Bailey	Pathé Exchange		Features Milton & Rita Mouse.
505	Stone Age Stunts	December 7, 1930	John Foster & Mannie Davis	Pathé Exchange		Features Milton & Rita Mouse.
506	The King of Bugs	December 21, 1930	John Foster & Harry Bailey	Pathé Exchange		

=== 1931 ===
#	Title	Release Date	Director	Distributor	Film	Notes
507	A Toytown Tale	January 4, 1931	John Foster & Mannie Davis	Pathé Exchange		
508	Red Riding Hood	January 18, 1931	John Foster & Harry Bailey	Pathé Exchange		The last cartoon distributed by Pathé Exchange, who would merge with RKO Pictures a couple of weeks later. The last Milton & Rita Mouse cartoon to use Mickey Mouse-like designs.
509	The Animal Fair	February 1, 1931	John Foster & Mannie Davis	RKO-Pathé Pictures		The first Aesop Fable cartoon released under the RKO-Pathé name.
510	Cowboy Blues	February 15, 1931	John Foster & Harry Bailey	RKO-Pathé Pictures		
511	Radio Racket	March 1, 1931	John Foster	RKO-Pathé Pictures		
512	College Capers	March 15, 1931	John Foster & Harry Bailey	RKO-Pathé Pictures		
513	Old Hokum Bucket	March 29, 1931	John Foster & Mannie Davis	RKO-Pathé Pictures		
514	Cinderella Blues	April 12, 1931	John Foster & Harry Bailey	RKO-Pathé Pictures		
515	Mad Melody	April 26, 1931	John Foster & Mannie Davis	RKO-Pathé Pictures		
516	The Fly Guy	May 10, 1931	John Foster & Harry Bailey	RKO-Pathé Pictures		
517	Play Ball	May 24, 1931	John Foster & Mannie Davis	RKO-Pathé Pictures		
518	Fisherman's Luck	June 13, 1931	John Foster & Harry Bailey	RKO-Pathé Pictures		
519	Pale Face Pup	June 22, 1931	John Foster & Mannie Davis	RKO-Pathé Pictures		
520	Makin' 'Em Move	July 5, 1931	John Foster & Harry Bailey	RKO-Pathé Pictures		Retitled "In A Cartoon Studio" by Official Films for home movie release.
521	Fun on the Ice	July 19, 1931	John Foster & Mannie Davis	RKO-Pathé Pictures		Retitled "Frisky Frolics" for TV release. Not to be confused with the 1930 short "Frozen Frolics".
522	The Big Game	August 3, 1931	John Foster & Harry Bailey	RKO-Pathé Pictures	Not Publicly Available	
523	Love in a Pond	August 17, 1931	John Foster & Mannie Davis	RKO-Pathé Pictures	With Reissue Titles.	
524	Fly Hi	August 31, 1931	John Foster & Harry Bailey	RKO-Pathé Pictures		Retitled "Love Bugs" for TV release. Was later redrawn colorized in the 1970s.
525	The Family Shoe	September 14, 1931	John Foster & Mannie Davis	RKO-Pathé Pictures	Home Movie Release.	Retitled "The Golden Goose" by Official Films for home movie release.
526	Fairyland Follies	September 28, 1931	John Foster & Harry Bailey	RKO-Pathé Pictures		
527	Horse Cops	October 12, 1931	John Foster & John MacManus	RKO-Pathé Pictures		
528	Cowboy Cabaret	October 26, 1931	John Foster & Mannie Davis	RKO-Pathé Pictures		
529	In Dutch	November 9, 1931	John Foster & Harry Bailey	RKO-Pathé Pictures		
530	The Last Dance	November 23, 1931	John Foster & Mannie Davis	RKO-Pathé Pictures		

=== 1932 ===
#	Title	Release Date	Director	Distributor	Film	Notes
531	Toy Time	January 27, 1932	John Foster & Harry Bailey	RKO Radio Pictures		The final appearance of Milton And Rita Mouse. Retitled "Toyland Adventure" by Official Films for home movie release.
532	A Romeo Monk	February 20, 1932	John Foster & Mannie Davis	RKO Radio Pictures	With Reissue Titles.	
533	Fly Frolic	March 5, 1932	John Foster & Harry Bailey	RKO Radio Pictures		
534	The Cat's Canary	March 26, 1932	John Foster & Mannie Davis	RKO Radio Pictures		Retitled "The Cat's Dilemma" by official Films for home movie release.
535	Magic Art	April 25, 1932	John Foster & Harry Bailey	RKO Radio Pictures		
536	Happy Polo	May 14, 1932	John Foster	RKO Radio Pictures		Sound reissue of 1929 short "The Polo Match".
537	Spring Antics	May 21, 1932	John Foster & Mannie Davis	RKO Radio Pictures		
538	Circus Romance	June 25, 1932	John Foster & Harry Bailey	RKO Radio Pictures		
539	The Farmerette	June 28, 1932	John Foster & Harry Bailey	RKO Radio Pictures		
540	The Stone Age Error	July 9, 1932	John Foster & Mannie Davis	RKO Radio Pictures		Sometimes misspelled "Stone Age Terror".
541	Chinese Jinks	July 23, 1932	John Foster & Mannie Davis	RKO Radio Pictures		
542	The Ball Game	July 30, 1932	John Foster & George Rufle	RKO Radio Pictures		
543	The Wild Goose Chase	August 12, 1932	John Foster & Mannie Davis	RKO Radio Pictures		
544	Nursery Scandal	August 26, 1932	John Foster & Harry Bailey	RKO Radio Pictures	With Reissue Titles.	
545	Bring 'Em Back Half Shot	September 9, 1932	John Foster & Mannie Davis	RKO Radio Pictures		
546	Down in Dixie	September 23, 1932	John Foster & Harry Bailey	RKO Radio Pictures	With Reissue Titles.	
547	A Cat-Fish Romance	October 7, 1932	John Foster & Mannie Davis	RKO Radio Pictures	Missing Scenes.	Missing some scenes.
548	Feathered Follies	October 21, 1932	John Foster & Harry Bailey	RKO Radio Pictures		
549	Venice Vamp	November 4, 1932	John Foster & Mannie Davis	RKO Radio Pictures		
550	Hokum Hotel	November 18, 1932	John Foster & Harry Bailey	RKO Radio Pictures		
551	Piccaninny Blues	December 12, 1932	John Foster & Mannie Davis	RKO Radio Pictures		Sometimes misspelled "Pickaninny Blues".
552	A Yarn of Wool	December 16, 1932	John Foster & Harry Bailey	RKO Radio Pictures		
553	Bugs & Books	December 30, 1932	John Foster & Mannie Davis	RKO Radio Pictures		

=== 1933 ===
#	Title	Release Date	Director	Distributor	Film	Notes
554	Silvery Moon	January 13, 1933	John Foster & Mannie Davis	RKO Radio Pictures		Released by Official Films under the name "Candy Town" for home movie release.
555	A.M To P.M	January 20, 1933	Harry Bailey	RKO Radio Pictures		This cartoon's art style would later be used for Van Beuren's The Little Kingcartoons. Features Sentinel Louey.
556	Tumble Down Town	January 27, 1933	John Foster & Harry Bailey	RKO Radio Pictures		Also Spelled "Tumbledown Town".
557	Opening Night	February 10, 1933	Mannie Davis	RKO Radio Pictures		First appearance of Cubby Bear.
558	Panicky Pup	February 24, 1933	John Foster & Harry Bailey	RKO Radio Pictures		
559	Love's Labor Won	March 10, 1933	John Foster & Mannie Davis	RKO Radio Pictures		Features Cubby Bear.
560	The Last Mail	March 24, 1933	Mannie Davis	RKO Radio Pictures		Features Cubby Bear.
561	Runaway Blackie	April 7, 1933	Harry Bailey	RKO Radio Pictures		
562	Bubbles & Troubles	April 28, 1933	Mannie Davis	RKO Radio Pictures		Features Cubby Bear.
563	A Dizzy Day	May 5, 1933	Harry Bailey	RKO Radio Pictures		This cartoon's art style would later be used for Van Beuren's 'The Little King' cartoons. Features Sentinel Louey.
564	Barking Dogs	May 18, 1933	Mannie Davis	RKO Radio Pictures		Features Cubby Bear.
565	The Bully's End	June 16, 1933	Harry Bailey	RKO Radio Pictures		
566	Indian Whoopee	July 7, 1933	Mannie Davis	RKO Radio Pictures		Features Cubby Bear.
567	Fresh Ham	July 12, 1933	Mannie Davis & Steve Mufatti	RKO Radio Pictures		Features Cubby Bear.
568	Rough on Rats	July 14, 1933	Harry Bailey	RKO Radio Pictures		Retitled "The Three Kittens" By Official Films for home movie release. The last Aesop Fable released that didn’t feature Cubby Bear.
569	The Nut Factory	August 11, 1933	Mannie Davis	RKO Radio Pictures		Features Cubby Bear.
570	Cubby's World Flight	August 25, 1933	Hugh Harman & Rudolf Ising	RKO Radio Pictures		Features Cubby Bear. Outsourced to Harman-Ising Productions.
571	Cubby's Picnic	October 6, 1933	Steve Mufatti & Eddie Donnelly	RKO Radio Pictures		Features Cubby Bear. Retitled "Picnic Problems" by Official Films for home movie release.
572	The Gay Gaucho	November 3, 1933	Rollin Hamilton & Thomas McKimson	RKO Radio Pictures		Features Cubby Bear. Outsourced to Harman-Ising Productions. Retitled "Gay Gaucho" by Official Films for home movie release.
573	Galloping Fanny	December 1, 1933	Steve Mufatti & Eddie Donnelly	RKO Radio Pictures		Features Cubby Bear. Retitled "Galloping Hoofs" by Official Films for home movie release.
574	Croon Crazy	December 29, 1933	Steve Mufatti	RKO Radio Pictures	With Reissue Titles.	Features Cubby Bear.

=== 1934 ===
#	Title	Release Date	Director	Distributor	Film	Notes
575	Sinister Stuff	January 26, 1934	Steve Muffati	RKO Radio Pictures		Features Cubby Bear. Retitled "The Villian Pursues Her" by Official Films for home movie & TV release, and later colorized in the 1970s.
576	Goode Knight	February 23, 1934	Vernon Stallings	RKO Radio Pictures		Features Cubby Bear. Retitled "Robin Hood Rides Again" by Official Films for home movie release.
577	How's Crops?	March 23, 1934	Vernon Stallings	RKO Radio Pictures		Features Cubby Bear. Retitled "Brownie's Victory Garden" by Official Films for home movie release.
578	Cubby's Stratosphere Flight	April 20, 1934	Vernon Stallings	RKO Radio Pictures		Features Cubby Bear.
579	Mild Cargo	May 18, 1934	Vernon Stallings	RKO Radio Pictures		Features Cubby Bear. Retitled "Brownie Bucks The Jungle" by Official Films for home movie release.
580	Fiddlin' Fun	June 15, 1934	Vernon Stallings	RKO Radio Pictures		Features Cubby Bear. The final Aesop Fable cartoon released.

Unreleased

Title	Intended Release Date	Director	Intended Distributor	Film	Notes
Mischievous Mice	1934	Hugh Harman & Rudolf Ising	RKO Radio Pictures		Features Cubby Bear. Outsourced to Harman-Ising Productions. Cancelled after animation production was done for unknown reasons, but was later released to TV with an added soundtrack in 1947.

== Legacy ==
Aesop's Fables provided inspiration to Walt Disney to found the Laugh-O-Gram Studio in Kansas City, Missouri, where he and Ub Iwerks co-created the Laugh-O-Grams and the Alice Comedies. Even into 1930, Disney wanted his cartoons to be as funny as the series.

== See also ==
- Animation in the United States during the silent era
