= College Capers =

1931 animated film

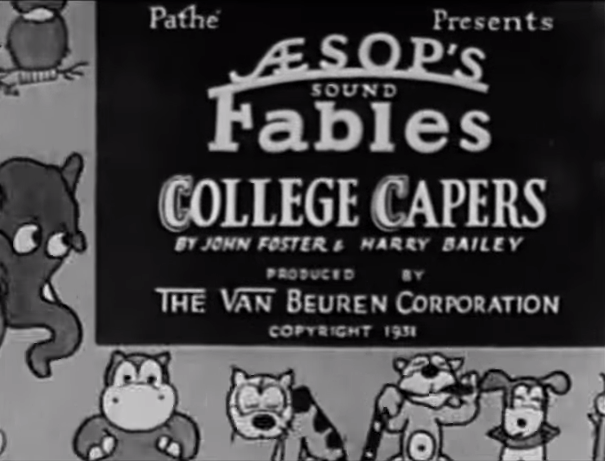
- Title card of College Capers.
- Directed by: John Foster; Harry Bailey
- Production company: The Van Beuren Corporation
- Distributed by: Pathé Exchange
- Release date: March 15, 1931
- Country: United States
- Language: English

College Capers is a 1931 animated short film produced by The Van Beuren Corporation and released by the film distributor Pathé Exchange.

The film, directed by John Foster and Harry Bailey, features the doings of a plethora of animals at college. The name of the cartoon means that the events in the cartoon represent mischief, as the informal meaning of Caper is "an ridiculous activity".

Released on March 15, 1931, the cartoon is part of the early sound series entitled Aesop's Sound Fables, but is not based on an actual Aesop fable.

Like other cartoons Van Beuren produced, the film has fallen into the public domain, because of their age, the studio's collapse, and their inclusion on budget DVDs.

== Plot ==
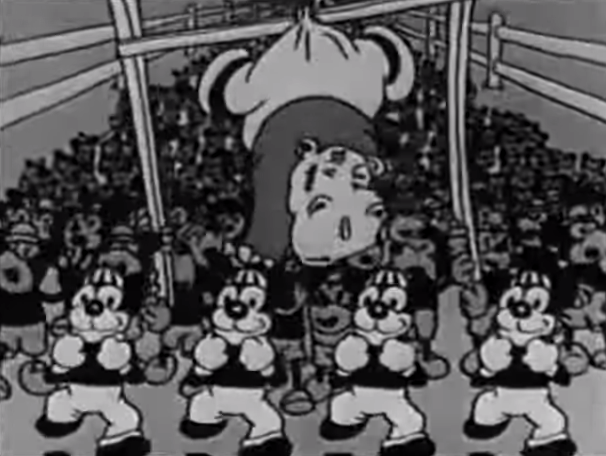
The film's closing shot: the hippo being strung from a goalpost.

The film begins with the animals travelling to college, whilst all singing a song. Once they are all in the classroom, the professor announces, in a nonsense accent, the roll-call. The animals, through a song, explain that they are all present. He is not amused, and angrily asks the students to sit down. After that, a student is caught sleeping by another pupil, who plays a song on his guitar to wake him up. Then, several students duplicate the song on other instruments, whilst others dance to it. This continues until the sports coach sucks them up in a giant vacuum cleaner to transport them to the viewer podium to watch a sports game.

At the beginning of the game, the band plays a song (with audio recycled from Circus Capers). After the playing, the game begins, which is a group of mice versus a hippo. At the start of the game, the first set of mice get flattened by the ball, due to the hippo treating the ball like a rolling pin. However, some of the mice manage to get on to his back to prevent him from scoring. This does not help, as the hippo scores anyway by flinging himself over the bar. After the game, the medics pick up the injured mice with a spatula, due to them being flattened. In the second game, the mice bring out substitutes for the injured.

When the second game starts, a group of mice form a pyramid and ram into the hippo. This makes one of the players go over him. When the hippo realises and tries to grab him. The mouse goes under the court to escape the hippo and run to the goalpost while the other mice pin the hippo down. The mouse scores the point, and wins the game. This makes the audience enter the court en masse to attack the hippo. The film ends with the entire college walking down the street and celebrating, with the hippo strung up from the goal.

== Characters ==
In the film, the characters are all animals—pigs, dogs, mice, etc.—that attend the college. There is also the hippo, who loses the game of American football. Milton Mouse and Rita Mouse do not appear in this cartoon due to a lawsuit agreement with Disney that Van Beuren would no longer use the characters.

== Reception ==
College Capers received positive reviews from the cinema magazines at that time. Film Daily said the film was "unusually good" and said the film had "laughable gags", while the Motion Picture Herald said the film was "just fair".
