= Small Town Sheriff =

1927 film

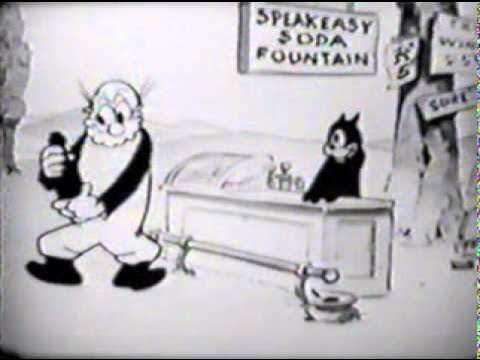
- Screenshot
- Directed by: Harry Bailey; John Foster; Frank Moser; Jerry Shields
- Produced by: Paul Terry; Amadee J. van Beuren
- Color process: Black and white
- Production companies: Fables Studios; Keith-Albee Theatres
- Distributed by: Pathé Exchange
- Release date: July 22, 1927
- Running time: 5:53
- Country: United States
- Language: English

Small Town Sheriff is a 1927 American silent animated short subject produced by Fables Studios and part of the Aesop's Fables film series started by Paul Terry.

== Plot ==
An 80-year-old man travels on a rural road in his single-seat car. When his radiator overheats, he heads to a nearby water pump to cool it before rolling again. After driving for some several yards, his car stops, prompting him to crank-start it. While he is restarting his car, someone comes and rides away with his vehicle.

Not knowing what to do after his car was stolen, the man comes to a soft drink stand operated by a black civet. Despite the stand being labelled "soda", the beverages served there seem to give customers depressant-like effects such as drowsiness. The man orders a soda bottle, but is unable to open it. As an alternative, the civet offers soda in a glass. Upon drinking the beverage, he starts to twitch and lose consciousness.

The man dreams of himself in space, being thrown from one rock to another. On one rock he meets an invisible entity wearing a hat, gloves, and boots. The entity sells the man a bottle of soda, but as he is about to drink, the bottle vanishes. When he goes on looking for it, another pair of boots approaches and kicks him from behind, sending him airborne. He lands on a rising umbrella, but trouble from a pesky bird causes him to fall off. He then falls onto some terrain with soft bumps that repeatedly expand and contract. After the bumps send him floating again, he is met again by the civet on a boat who tosses him a ring attached to a rope. When he tries to reach the boat, a meteor comes and strikes the vessel. With no aid left, he tries in vain to swim himself to safety.

Finally waking up from his soda-manifested dream, the man finds himself being watched by the civet and various other stand patrons. He soon learns that the beverages are not good for consumption, and goes on to reveal himself as a sheriff by showing a brass star on his chest. The uncovered sheriff pulls out a gun and shoos away everybody at the scene.

== Home media ==
The short is included in the Giant 600 Cartoon Collection.
