= The Window Washers =

1925 film

- Directed by: Paul Terry; John Foster; Frank Moser; Harry Bailey; Jerry Shields
- Story by: Paul Terry
- Produced by: Paul Terry; Amedee J. Van Beuren
- Animation by: Harry Bailey; Frank Moser; John Foster; Jerry Shields
- Color process: Black and white
- Production companies: Fables Studios; Keith-Albee Theatres
- Distributed by: Pathé Exchange
- Release date: July 20, 1925
- Running time: 6:23 (correct speed)
- Country: United States
- Language: Silent (English intertitles)

The Window Washers is a 1925 American animated silent short subject produced by Fables Studios, and one of the Aesop's Fables cartoons started by animator Paul Terry. When released for television in the 1950s, musical tracks were added.

== Summary ==
A cat and a rat are in an automobile, riding on a rural road. Different from how most cats appear earlier in the series, the feline in the cartoon wears shorts, one of few things that would inspire Walt Disney to create Oswald the Lucky Rabbit in 1927. While the cat and the rat go on riding, a highway patrol cop on a motorbike pursues them, believing they are traveling too fast, though they aren't really. To lose their chaser, they disconnect the car's frame. The frame falls on the road and knocks the cop off the motorbike. The cat and the rat continue their journey, using only the wheels of their vehicle.

In another scene in the area, an elderly man is having some slight problems with his car. He goes for a drive but the vehicle travels in a rugged fashion. When he reaches home, the elderly man gets thrown off his car, and lands on a puddle, thus splashing mud on one of his house's windows. He then goes indoors to clean himself.

Several moments later, the cat and the rat arrive at the elderly man's house. They then notice a sign saying window washers are needed. The cat then takes a bucket of water but the uses the rat as a cloth to wipe the mud stain on the window. When the stain is removed, the cat puts his buddy down. The rat, for some reason, is half-crippled but is still able to walk. Totally annoyed, the rat picks up the bucket and hurls it at the cat. The cat chases the rat into the house.

Inside the elderly man's home, the cat chases the rat which enters a crack in the wall. While trying to extract the rat, the cat gets pulled down by a nearby fish which mistook the cat's tail for a worm. When the cat struggles from the fish, the rat comes out of the crack and drops a brick on the cat's head, a gag reminiscent of the Krazy Kat cartoons which were popular at the time.

As he continues to go after the rat, the cat is met by the large pack of weasels which spray water at him using a hose. The elderly man also arrives at the scene, and gets sprayed on too. When the cat and the elderly man flee the vicinity of the house, the weasels pursue them, carrying soda siphons.
