= Laundry Blues (film) =

1930 animated film

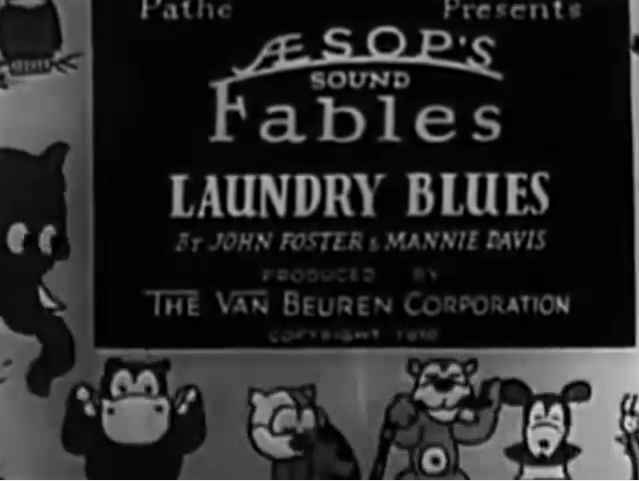
The title card of Laundry Blues

Laundry Blues is a 1930 animated short film produced by The Van Beuren Corporation and released by Pathe. The film, which takes place in a laundromat run by Chinese caricatures, was released on August 17, 1930.

The film is part of the cartoon series entitled Aesop's Sound Fables, a set of sound cartoons, which spurn of a series of silent cartoon made in the twenties which were adaptions of Aesop's Fables. Although it is part of the series, it is not based on a fable written by Aesop.

== Plot ==
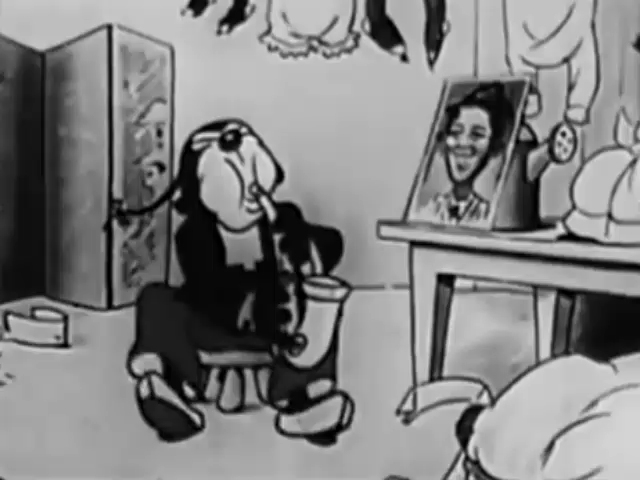
The servant in the film playing the saxophone whilst trying to imitate Rudy Vallée.

The film begins with a gong being struck several times. A curtain then rises to a view of 4 Chinese people ironing a shirt. They then break out in song, singing nonsense phrases, parodying Mandarin.

Then, a servant who is carrying tea and walking in time to the music, slips on a bar of soap and falls into the bucket used for cleaning clothes. A cleaner then notices him and scolds him. He then retrieves the tea which is in the basket. He pours a cup and drinks it. The servant notices the bubbles and runs. Once the cleaner notices, he removes and shakes his head to stop the bubbles. He then laughs and continues cleaning.

Then, a Jewish man appears at the front desk, saying that he has a ticket. He hands it to the receptionist, who has trouble understanding the Hebrew text on the card. He then asks the other men about it, but to no avail, so the receptionist asks the Jewish man about it. The Jewish caricature then explains that the card is for a cleaning of his beard, which the receptionist does. Then, the Jewish man leaves happily to the tune of "Khosn kale mazel tov". The servant, who is in a room by himself, takes out his saxophone, and tries to imitate Rudy Vallée, by comparing himself to Vallee to a photograph in his jacket. He tries several times, before giving up and blowing a raspberry at the photo.

There is then four men in a sauna singing phrases of nonsense, again, parodying Mandarin. The servant, in the middle of the song, breaks his saxophone again and starts to play it in time with the song. The men realise and the town descends into chaos. Soon a stick of dynamite blows up the entire town. The four men which were featured at the start of the cartoon then descend from the rubble and sings the last section from the song which appeared at the start. The film ends with the four men saying "Chop suey".

== Characters ==
Unlike some of the other Aesop's Sound Fables which include Milton and Rita Mouse, this cartoon features a set of Chinese caricatures, who speak and sings nonsense phrases and songs. The film also includes a Jewish caricature, which has his beard cleaned by the receptionist.

== Reception ==
The film was well-received by The Motion Picture News. A review on the August 23, 1930 issue states that the cartoon is packed with "laughs and a decided relief from other cartoons" and also stated that the cartoon will "bolster up a weak bill".
