= The Iron Man (1930 film) =

1930 animated film

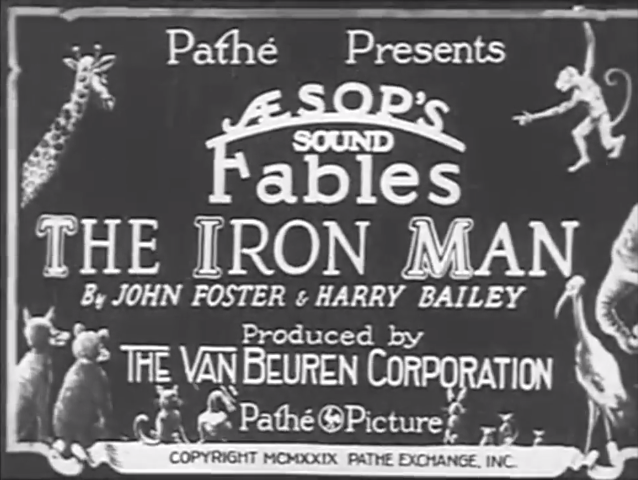
The title card of The Iron Man

The Iron Man is a 1930 animated short film which was directed by John Foster and Harry Bailey. It was produced by The Van Beuren Corporation, and released by Pathé Exchange, a film distributor which had the newsreel Pathé News.

The film was also part of the early sound cartoon series entitled Aesop's Sound Fables. Although the film is part of that-said series, the film is actually not based on a fable written by Aesop. Another abnormality with this film is that although it was released in 1930, the copyright notice on the actual film reads in roman numerals MCMXXIX, which translates to 1929.

== Plot ==
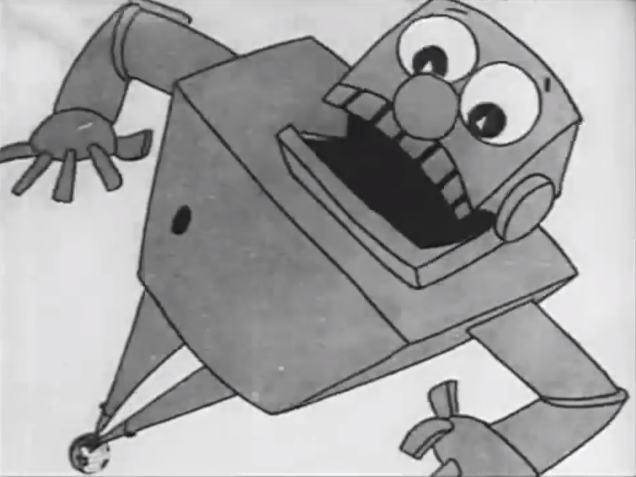
The Iron Man in outer space.

The film begins with a male cat walking down the street singing and playing a music box. He then descends onto a neighborhood. He plays there until Farmer Al Falfa, a recurring character in the Aesop series, looks out of his window, and describes the music as "rotten". He then gets out of his house, and asks the cat to leave. He compiles, by running off the screen. The farmer, then chases a pair of chickens, who were there when the cat first descended onto the neighborhood. They then fly up onto a branch of a tree. Once up there, one chicken lays an egg and flings it at the farmer. The farmer, for retaliation, acquires a saw, and climbs up the tree, nearly falling off it whilst climbing. Once at the same level as the chickens, he brings out his saw and begins to cut. As soon as they realize that the farmer is cutting off an individual branch, which would make the farmer fall off the tree. The chickens retreat to the trunk of the tree, but the tree branch stays standing, whilst the rest of the tree collapses. The farmer then descends from the branch to the ground, but the branch hits him and the animals, who were watching the ordeal, starts to laugh at him.

The farmer then returns home. Once he is back home and sitting on the stair leading to his front door, the postal service arrives with a package which is delivered via a horse drawn carriage. That package is a machine, an iron man. Once the farmer opens up the package. The robot starts to dance, with the farmer following along. During the dance, the robot kicks the farmer. In retaliation, the farmer kicks the robot back. This causes the robot to malfunction, by gradually increasing in size, until it is bigger than the Earth. The robot then explodes. The farmer then laughs at the animals. Until, the debris falls from space and reassembles the robot. Both the farmer and the animals run from the robot in the closing shot of the cartoon.

The film ends with a moral, which is portrayed with a duck and a sleeping Milton Mouse, the only time he is featured in this cartoon. The duck states that "an oyster is a fish dressed up like a nut". The duck's statement wakes up the sleeping mouse. The duck then tugs at the mouse's fishing pole, mistaking Milton that he has caught a fish. Milton proceeds to pull at the pole, which results in him falling off the duck and into the water. The film ends with the duck laughing.

== Characters ==
This cartoon, unlike other Aesop Sound Fables at that time, does not feature Rita Mouse and features Milton Mouse only once. Milton is featured in the moral which is at the end of the cartoon. Instead, another recurring character entitled Farmer Al Falfa is featured in this cartoon, portrayed as the main character, where he unexpectedly receives the iron man via post. Other characters in the film are a variety of species of animals, and the iron-man, who chases after all the characters at the end of the cartoon.

== Reception ==
The film gathered positive reviews from the film magazines at that time. The Motion Picture News said that the film has "nearly everything needed in a short of pen-and-ink variety", and also said the film's music created "many laughs when tied up to the antics to the cartoon characters". The magazine's closing comment is that "a good slapstick, or a short dramatic number will go along well with this".
