= Good Old Schooldays =

1930 animated film

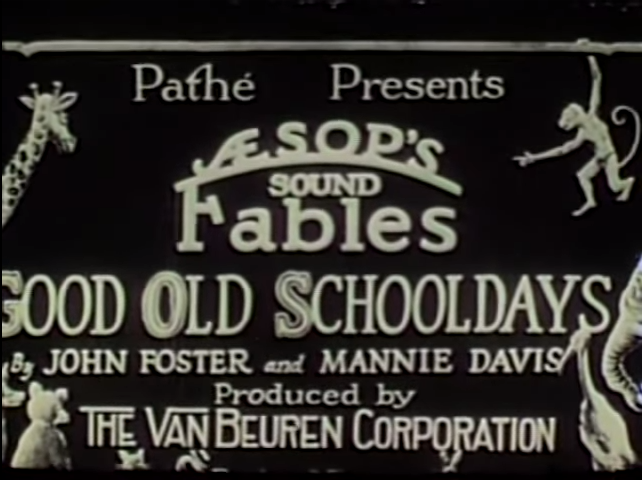
The title card for Good Old Schooldays

Good Old Schooldays is a 1930 American animated short film produced by The Van Beuren Corporation and released by Pathé Exchange. The film, which features Willie Jones and other animals, was directed by John Foster and Mannie Davis, with synchronization by Gene Rodemich.

Released on March 7, 1930, the film takes place inside of a schoolhouse, and is part of a series entitled Aesop's Sound Fables, though its plot has no relation to the fables.

== Characters ==
This cartoon features a Willie Jones appearance. As with many of the Aesop Sound Fables at that time, there are also animal characters, like donkeys, dogs, and mice.

== Plot ==
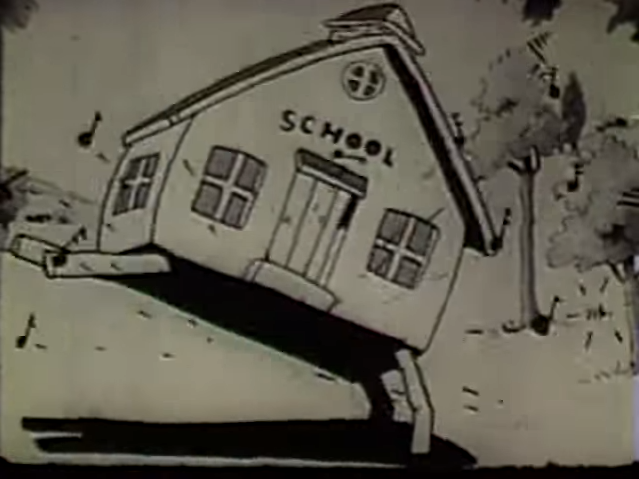
The school dancing

The film starts with many species of animals traveling to school, like walking, shooting a slingshot at the pig's ass sitting in the cart, or taking his girlfriend sitting on a skateboard, to the tune of the spelling song Mississippi. The teacher then rings a bell to signal the start of lessons. In response, she gets run over by the excited students entering the school.

An elephant is angry about going to school, but he stops and writes in the letter of forgiveness to the teacher for missing Willie Jones the day before, who is probably the elephant's brother, that he caught a possum. Soon, he is happy and bouncy as he enters the school, but trips on the stairs. A girl mouse walks to school with her sheep, and the furry animal kicks the mouse into the classroom, and jumps down the mountains with her back legs behind her. The children sing "My Country, 'Tis of Thee", which was a de facto anthem for America at that time. After the singing, an pup gives the teacher an apple, but he takes advantage of the fact that the teacher is writing in a notebook, probably correcting a student's lesson, and eats a piece of the apple, but he is still hungry, and has the piece tucked into his cheek. He takes advantage, and puts the piece back on the teacher's table, and eats the whole apple. rita then plays a piano, and milton sings a song. However, he forgets the other words and begins to sing phrases of nonsense, being applauded by the whole class soon after pulling his girlfriend's tail and her panties showing. rita introduces herself to the class, but milton appears and, as she lifts her butt, he tears a piece of cloth, embarrassing her, thinking that her panties have torn due to the distance she leaned, ending with the teacher complaining. The puppy pretends to be tight, to be released and go home to eat jam. When the animal returns to its chair, a pig, sitting behind it, licks its jelly mouth, disturbing the dog. The teacher, irritated, hits the ruler again, and ends up breaking it, ending up with a donkey, grounded in the corner, laughing at her.

After the performance, the teacher asks a bear (this is Willie Jones) in the class if he has written his composition yet. Jones says no, but he can whistle "the theme song". He then brings out a flute and starts to play. The other animals join in, using both themselves and various items as instruments. These include the donkey using his dunce cap as a trumpet, the elephant using his trunk as a trombone, and several ducks using their beaks as a xylophone. The teacher hits the ruler on the table but, due to her movements, she starts to like the music and this movement ends up like a dance. Due to the music, the schoolhouse comically dances. As a result of the dancing, the building collapses and all the animals run out of it.

== The moral of the story ==
The film ends with an unrelated short cartoon featuring a man and a woman. The man states that "A Powdered Nose is No Guarantee of a Clean Neck". This angers the lady, who trips him with her foot and hits him in the head with her purse.

This moral also appears in Lumber Jacks (1924), more known from the sound reissue titled Wood Choppers (1929), from the same series, at Fables Pictures, Inc. The only difference is that in this cartoon, the moral is animated, whereas the 1924 and 1929 ones are not.

== Reception ==
Good Old Schooldays received mixed reviews in the cinema review magazines at that time. The cartoon was featured as ''Okay'' by the Motion Picture News. The magazine said that whilst "this release has sufficient merriment to tickle the sides of the crabbish", the magazine criticised the lack of amusing gags and the magazine's closing note for the cartoon was that it was "okay for a heavy feature". The cartoon was viewed more favorable by The Film Daily, which said the film was a "highly amusing filler".
