= Gypped in Egypt =

1930 animated film

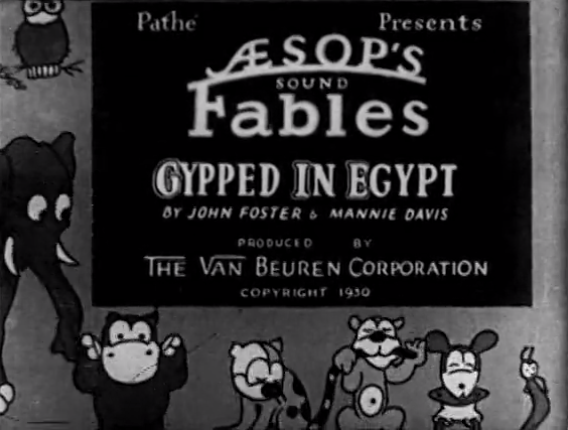
The title card of Gypped in Egypt.

Gypped in Egypt is a 1930 animated short film directed by John Foster and Mannie Davis. The film was produced by The Van Beuren Corporation and released by Pathé Exchange, a film distributor with a newsreel titled Pathé News.

The plot explores the journeying of an anthropomorphic dog and cat in the country Egypt.

Copyrighted as Gyped in Egypt and released on November 9, 1930, the film is part of an early cartoon series titled Aesop's Sound Fables, although the film is not based on an Aesop fable.

== Plot ==
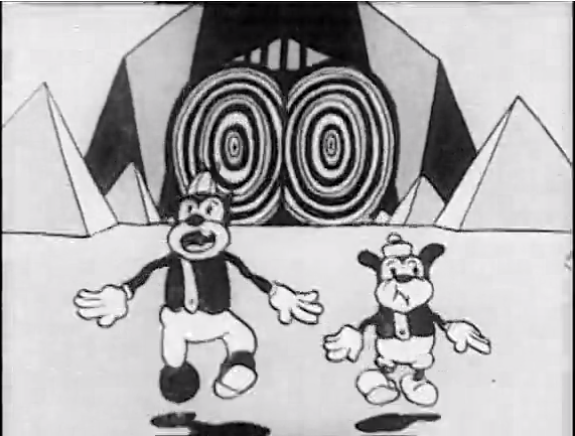
Waffles and Don run from a Sphinx's head.

The film begins with Waffles and Don sleeping on a hammock which is strung by a camel. Waffles and Don sleep on the hammock until the camel kicks them out. Don looks around and finds a source of water. Once arriving at that source, a fight breaks out between the three of them due to the camel trying to drink the water. The fight kills the camel, who is punched several times in the face by Waffles. However, a bird drinks the water instead when they are not looking.

A sphinx then arrives from the distance and accuses them of killing the camel. Waffles denies this, and instead blames Don. Waffles then hallucinates and they both end up in a pyramid. After they both inspect the room, Don finds a coin-slot in one of the tombs and inserts a coin. This opens the tomb and reveals a skeleton. The skeleton then gets out of the tomb and starts to dance. This makes the art on the walls start to dance.

After the dance, the skeleton then retreats to the tomb, but the skeleton leaves his leg outside. When he retrieves to get it, Don hits him over the head with it. When Don tries to see what the tomb is like, Waffles, in a state of panic, pushes him in to the tomb. Waffles is dragged into the tomb, and a fight breaks out between the three of them. As a result of the fight, Waffles and Don are both thrown from the tomb and into another part of the pyramid.

After inspection, the little dog, despite being told not to by Waffles, pulls some hairs from a mummy, which makes a sound similar to a fire alarm. This makes a skeleton and two cats gather round a wheelbarrow and turns it into a makeshift firetruck. Both Waffles and Don follow the wheelbarrow, until the skeleton flings them off it and they fall into another room. After inspection, Don leans on an unknown item, which produce a piano-like sound. Thus, Don begins to play a song on it. A skeleton then expands it into an upright piano and begins to play a duet with the little dog.

After the duet, both dogs leave through an opening in the wall. They then take an elevator to a top of an Egyptian style elevator shaft. After reaching the top, they walk off the ledge and falls back down to the bottom. They then start running through the landscape, but they turn back after seeing a giant sphinx face in the sky. The film ends with both Waffles and Don running from the giant face.

== Characters ==
Unlike other Sound Fables of this time, the main characters are not Milton and Rita Mouse. Instead they are a pair of a dog and cat, Waffles and Don. Other characters include Egyptian mummies, sphinxes, and a plethora of skeletons, who are inside the tombs and the pyramids.

== Reception ==
Gypped in Egypt received mixed reviews from the cinema magazines at that time. The Film Daily said that the film was "a nightmare of goofy antics cleverly worked out for the laughs", while the Motion Picture News said that the film was fair.
