= A Close Call =

1929 animated film

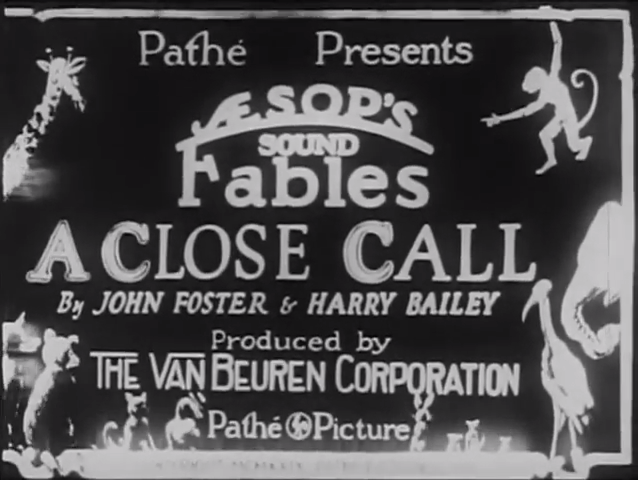
- Title card
- Produced by: The Van Beuren Corporation
- Distributed by: Pathé Exchange
- Release date: December 1, 1929
- Running time: 7:22
- Country: United States
- Language: English

A Close Call is a 1929 animated short film which is part of the early sound cartoon series entitled Aesop's Sound Fables. It was produced by The Van Beuren Corporation and released by Pathé Exchange.

Copyrighted on December 1, 1929, the film, like many other Aesop Sound Fables at that time, featured Milton Mouse and Rita as the main characters in this cartoon. They are featured in a more simple mouse-like fashion, than the more complicated human-like fashion in cartoons like Circus Capers. Despite being part of the Aesop series, it is not based on an Aesop fable.

== Plot ==
A Close Call (1929)

Milton and Rita are seen dancing together. A Birman cat, who is driving a car, sees Rita, and when Milton is not looking, kidnaps her. Milton notices Rita's disappearance, and starts to chase after the car.

The cat takes Rita to a barn, and tries to offer her some pearls. Outraged, Rita throws the pearls back at the cat, causing him to swallow them. She hides in another room.

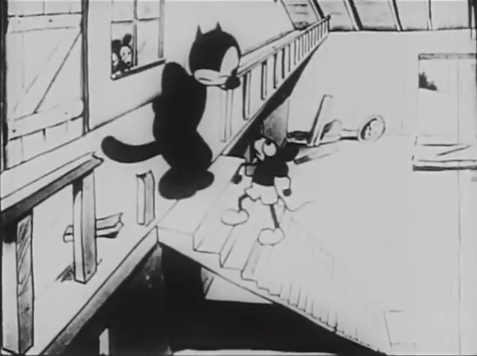
Milton Mouse confronts the Birman cat, who is holding Rita captive.

Milton arrives at the barn and kicks down the doors. He sees Rita and tries to reach her, but the cat kicks him down the stairs. The cat then ties Milton up to a log, and starts up a saw, with the intention of sawing him in half. The police notice the noise, and they circle the house. The cat is killed in the police ambush, freeing Rita. Milton is saved by a police officer, who shuts off the saw.

The mice agree to get married. During the wedding, the pastor sneezes into the book. The pastor ties Milton and Rita's tails in two, which is a pun on tying the knot. The choir sings "You're in the Army Now!". Milton and Rita then kiss.

It then cuts to an scene, which states that "2600 Years Ago Aesop Said, All's Well That Ends Well", which is incorrect, as Aesop was not born 2600 years ago, and the term "All's Well That Ends Well" was written by William Shakespeare, not Aesop.

== Reception ==
A Close Call was well received by the cinema magazines at that time. The Motion Picture News stated that the cartoon was "right up to standard, and even a little higher than average" and also stating that it "furnishes plenty of laughs for the light spot on your bill". The Film Daily said that the film was a "Fine Animated Film", and that the film "succeeded in creating considerable suspense".
