= Dixie Days =

1930 animated film

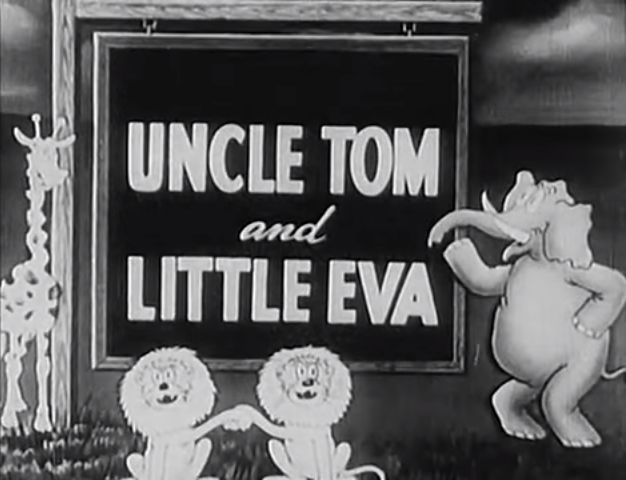
The title card of the reissue Uncle Tom and Little Eva

Dixie Days (also known as Uncle Tom and Little Eva) is a 1930 animated short film which was produced by The Van Beuren Corporation and released by Pathé Exchange.

The film, which was directed by John Foster and Mannie Davis, is a take on Uncle Tom's Cabin, as it featured African caricatures as slaves, as they defy their owner and free themselves from them. The name of the film means the cartoon took place in the Southern United States, as Dixie is the nickname of the South.

Released on March 9, 1930, the cartoon is also part of the early sound cartoon series entitled Aesop's Sound Fables, but is not based on an Aesop fable.

== Plot ==
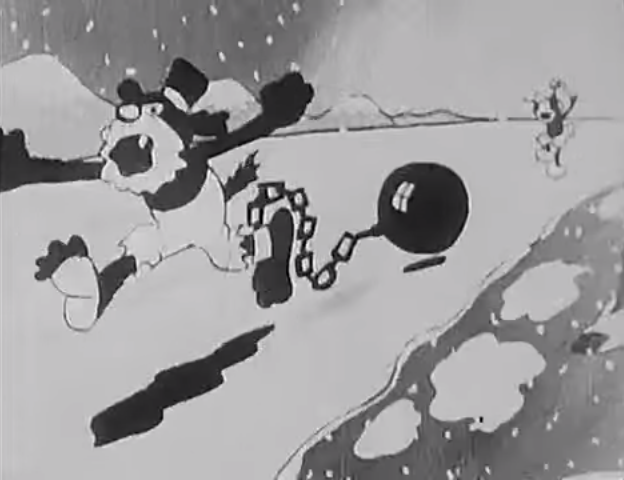
Uncle Tom and Popsy going up the mountain.

The film begins on a slave-ship which expands and shrinks like an accordion. On the boat, a set of four animals (one with a guitar) sings "Carry Me Back to Old Virginny". Once they arrive, Uncle Tom starts to play a recorder outside his cabin. This makes Popsy (as her uncle calls her) descend onto the cabin. Upon arrival, Uncle Tom asks where her friend, Little Eva, is. Just then, she descends onto the cabin. Uncle Tom plays a song, which both Popsy and Little Eva dance to.

However, the slave-keeper hears this and takes both Uncle Tom and Popsy as slaves, leaving Little Eva in tears. They are both taken to a slave-auction, where they must perform. The first one to perform is Uncle Tom, who falls over at the end of his performance, due to his lack of strength and malnutrition. In response, the keepers blow raspberries at him after the performance.

The second to perform is Popsy, who treats the audition block as a xylophone. She is viewed more favourable than Uncle Tom, but the slave-keepers chant "We want either!". When they are chanting that, a mother and her baby do spot the slave-keepers and runs to the mountains.

However, one of the slave-keeper spots them and sends blood hounds in order to catch them. The slave-keeper also tries to catch them via paddleboat. They are both unsuccessful, due to Uncle Tom breaking off his chain on his ball and chain and using it to make the slave-keeper's paddleboat fall off a waterfall. After that, the four animals then sing "Dixie". Until, a chicken appears and crows. They stop singing, and the film ends with the four animals pursuing the chicken.

== Characters ==
In this cartoon, the main characters are Uncle Tom, Popsy, and a set of slave-keepers. There are also a set of African caricatures, who are portrayed as slaves.

== Reception ==
Dixie Days received positive reviews from the cinema magazines at that time. The Film Daily said that the cartoon had some "really amusing moments". The Motion Picture News said the film was "ideal as relief from a heavy feature".
