= Frank Moser =

Frank Moser may refer to:

- Frank Moser (artist) (1886–1964), American artist, illustrator and film director
- Frank Moser (tennis) (born 1976), German tennis player
