= Scrambled Eggs (1926 film) =

1926 film

- Directed by: Paul Terry; Frank Moser; Bill Tytla
- Produced by: Paul Terry; Amadee J. Van Beuren
- Animation by: Frank Moser; Bill Tytla
- Color process: Black and white
- Production companies: Fables Studios; Keith-Albee Theatres
- Distributed by: Pathé Film Exchange, Inc.
- Release date: August 22, 1926
- Running time: 6:28 (correct speed)
- Country: United States
- Language: Silent (English intertitles)

The Cartoon With TV Titles.

Scrambled Eggs is a 1926 American silent animated short film created by Fables Studios. It is among the cartoons of the Aesop's Fables with the appearance of Farmer Al Falfa, both created when its originator Paul Terry was still involved. One of the reissues of this cartoon, the Commonwealth TV reissue, made in the 50s, titles this cartoon as Closer than a Brother, the same name as a 1925 cartoon, which is also part of Aesop's Fables.

== Plot ==
A cat stubbornly refuses to get off of bed but eventually does, thanks to his helpful animated clock. He then plays some music in a stereo for exercising, and later goes to the dining room where he has flapjacks for breakfast. Finally he heads for work in his bicycle.

The cat works in a poultry compound run by strict Famer Al Falfa. One of his duties is to make sure the hens are laying a sufficient number of eggs. He then courteously directs Farmer Al Falfa to the office. Also entering the office is a ballerina who is a typist as well as the cat's love interest. The cat likes the ballerina a lot that he goes on to trade kisses with her. Finding the romance potentially distracting, Farmer Al Falfa intervenes and tells the cat to package the eggs in racks.

At the egg-packaging area in the compound, the cat tells the hens to roll eggs down the slides. As the eggs come down, the cat pushes one rack after another each time one becomes full. After filling several racks and getting tired a little, he becomes uncommitted and therefore abandons his work which is far from finished. He then comes to and invites the ballerina to play with him outside. While they are having fun playing jump rope, a lot of eggs end up smashed on the floor as a result of an overfilled rack which is left unmoved.

In the office, Farmer Al Falfa is napping. Momentarily, he gets up and heads to the egg-packaging place to check the cat's work. To his horror, he sees the mess piling up which indicate hundreds of dollars in losses.

Just outside the compound, the cat and the ballerina are still playing with each other. The infuriated Farmer Al Falfa comes out, confronts them and fires the cat before taking the ballerina back inside.

In the packaging area, Farmer Al Falfa reprimands the weeping ballerina. The disposed cat sneaks in and sees what's going on. The cat then climbs a stack of egg-filled racks before pushing and dropping one off. That rack falls on and flattens the geezer unconscious. The cat picks up the ballerina and runs with her into the horizon.

2600 years ago, Aesop said: "All eggs looks alike until you open them".

== Characters ==
According to the Motion Picture Copyright Descriptions, the names of the cats in love are "Thomas" and "Stella", and there is a participation here of Farmer Al Falfa, being used a lot in those years by Paul Terry.
