= Milton Mouse =

Animated film character

- Aesop Fable Cartoon Series character
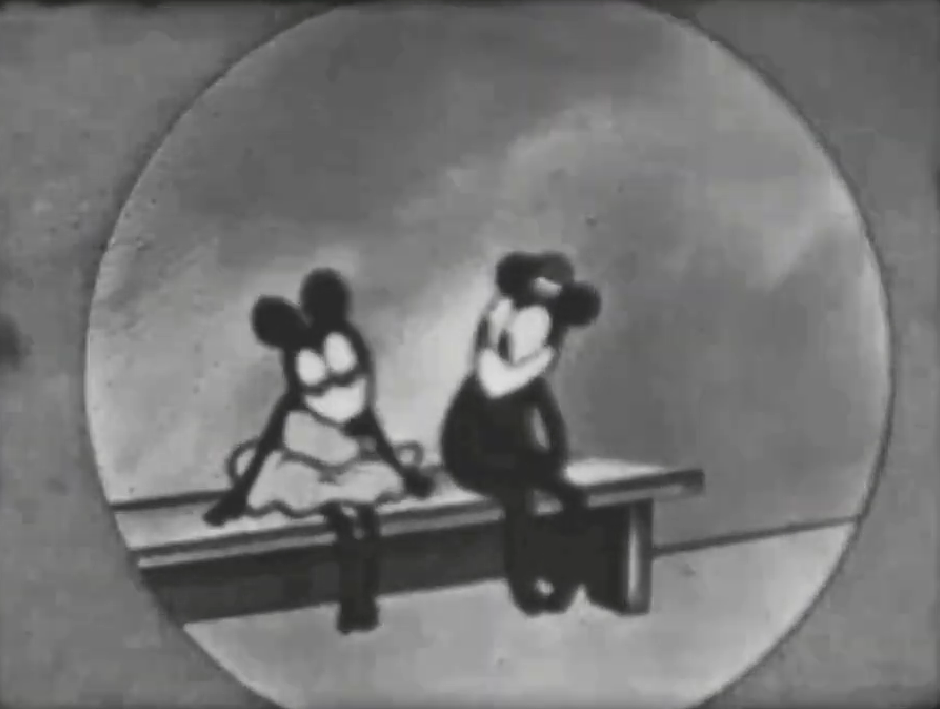
- First appearance: The Goose That Laid the Golden Egg; June 19, 1921
- Last appearance: Toy Time; January 27, 1932
- Created by: Paul Terry

In-universe information
- Species: Mouse
- Gender: Male

Milton Mouse is an animated character created at Fables Studios for Paul Terry's cartoon series Aesop's Fables (later Aesop's Sound Fables). The character was introduced in 1921, and appeared in dozens of cartoon shorts through 1931. Milton often appeared alongside a girlfriend mouse, usually named Rita.

In 1929, animator John Foster redesigned Milton and Rita to look more like Mickey and Minnie Mouse, who had become very popular following the 1928 release of the Walt Disney cartoon Steamboat Willie.

Milton's new, Mickey-inspired design debuted in the cartoon A Close Call, released in 1929. Further cartoons released in 1930 included Western Whoopee, Circus Capers and The Office Boy. A lawsuit filed by Walt Disney in 1931 claiming copyright infringement put a stop to Milton's appearances.

== History ==
Paul Terry and Amadee J. Van Beuren established Fables Pictures in 1920, and began producing Aesop's Fables cartoons in 1921.

Terry has been credited with being the first animator to use mouse characters, in the July 26, 1921 film Mice in Council, which told the story of mice tying a bell to a cat's neck. The next film, July 31's Country Mouse and City Mouse, established that Terry's mouse characters wore gloves and boots.

The character of "Milton Mouse" has been credited to Terry employee William Ferguson in 1921. The September 27, 1922 cartoon The Fable of the Romantic Mouse was the first to establish a female mouse character, who in this picture was called Lizzie. Later films called Milton's girlfriend Rita or Mary.

Milton Mouse and his girlfriend appeared in dozens of cartoons made under the supervision of Paul Terry. At first, Milton was a mischievous character trying to find treasure or steal food, in appearances including The Fortune Hunters, Cheating the Cheaters, and The Pearl Divers. Later, Milton played the hero, rescuing Rita from villainous cats and other threatening animals, in films including Sink or Swim, The Big Tent, Saved by a Keyhole, Our Little Nell, A Lad and His Lamp, and The Enchanted Flute.

Terry directed most of the Fables Pictures films until 1929, when he was fired by Van Beuren over disputes related to disagreements about sound synchronization and financial profits. Terry formed his own studio, Terry-Toons, and animator John Foster took Terry's place.

=== Milton's redesign ===
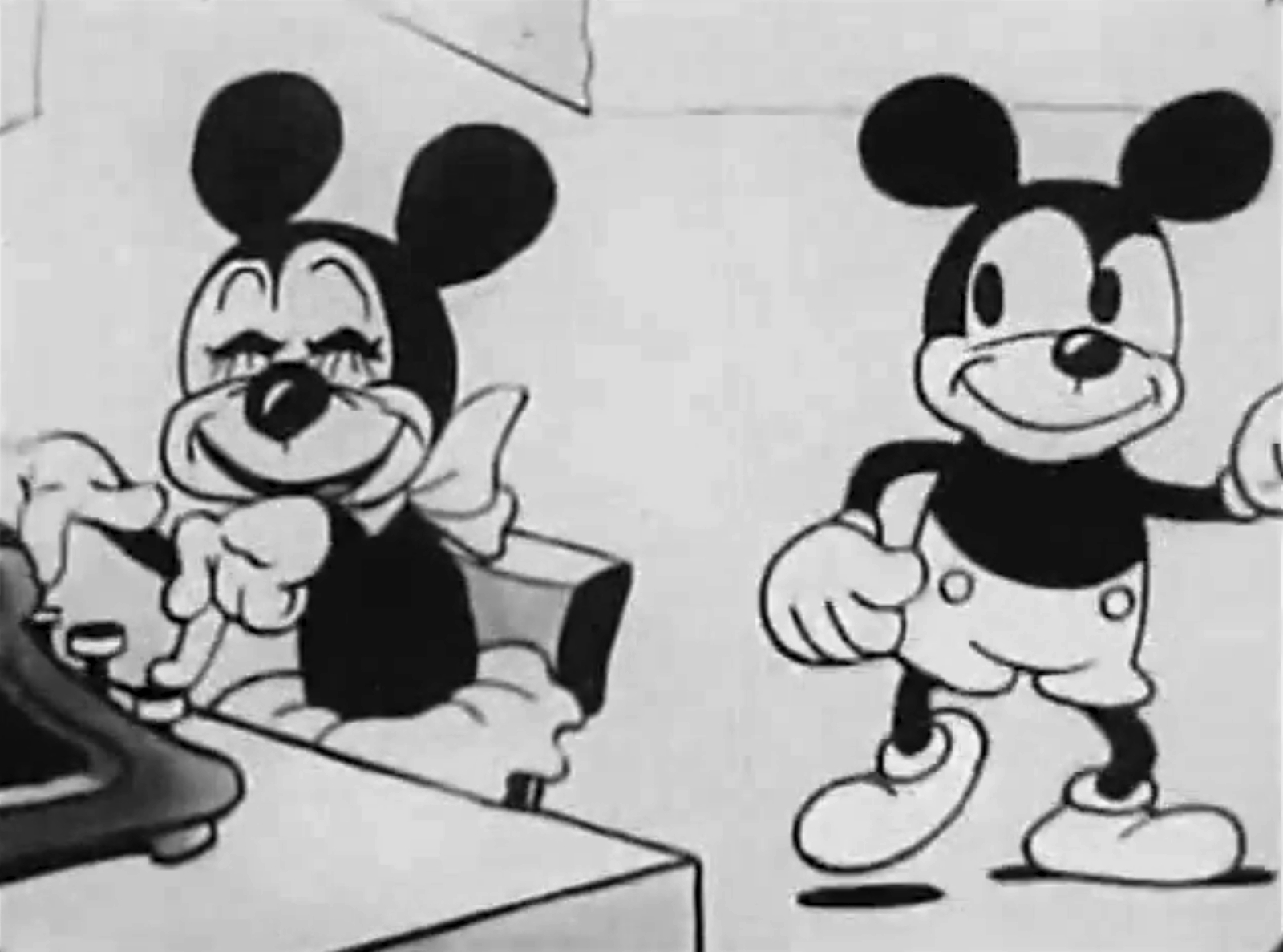
Milton and Rita, redesigned by John Foster.

Once Terry left the studio, Van Beuren renamed the enterprise Van Beuren Productions. The boss allowed Foster to change the character designs of Milton and Rita, to make them look more like the increasingly popular Mickey and Minnie Mouse.

According to Hal Erickson, author of a book on the Van Beuren studio: "Beginning with A Close Call in December of 1929, Milton and his sweetie took on a rounder, cuter look, especially in the vicinity of the nose and ears. Milton also acquired a pair of white shorts while his lady friend wore a frilly white dress. When the two mice make their first appearance in A Close Call skipping through a field of musical flowers, one is startled by their strong resemblance to Mickey and Minnie Mouse."

As Van Beuren continued to release Milton cartoons in 1930, the design grew even more Mickey-like. Further cartoons included Singing Saps, Western Whoopee, Hot Tamale, Circus Capers, and Stone Age Stunts.

The cartoon The Office Boy is seen as a particularly vulgar use of the Mickey and Minnie clones. In this short, Milton works as the janitor and receptionist at E.X.Y. Railroad, a job that entails him sitting on a stool outside the president's door, greeting approaching guests. Rita, the president's gum-chewing secretary, carries on a flirtation with Milton, and they type love notes to each other on Rita's typewriter. The boss also flirts with Rita, and Milton sees through the keyhole that the pair are dancing in the office. The boss tries to kiss Rita, and we see in silhouette Rita's attempts to fight him off. When the president's battle-axe wife approaches, Milton is happy to usher her into the office to catch her husband in a compromising position. Milton and Rita sneak away as the married couple battles in the office. In Mickey's Movies, Gijs Grob writes: "In this cartoon, the designs and animation of Milton and Rita are terrible, but too close for comfort, and some of Mickey's mannerisms have clearly been copied." This cartoon would lead to trouble for the Van Beuren studio.

=== Lawsuit ===
On January 28, 1931, Walt Disney saw The Office Boy at the Orpheum Theater in Los Angeles, and took umbrage at the flagrant use of his characters. Disney filed suit against the Van Beuren Corporation in March of 1931, charging them with copyright infringement. Disney sought an injunction to keep Van Beuren from using characters "in any variation so nearly similar as to be mistaken" for Mickey and Minnie Mouse, and alleged that the mouse was portrayed in a "jerky and amateurish style, ugly, unattractive and lacking in personality." A United Press wire service story noted that Mickey and Minnie had been copyrighted in 1928 by Disney, and alleged that Van Beuren had made one million dollars from their use of the ersatz mouse.

On April 30, 1931, a temporary court injunction was filed against the Van Beuren company, charging with character infringement.

In court, Van Beuren argued that Milton Mouse had appeared in films as early as 1921, and therefore pre-dated Mickey. Disney's lawyers held that the Van Beuren mice were redesigned to look exactly like Mickey and Minnie after the pair had become famous. Several animators filed affidavits to address the proposed infringement.

In August of 1931, Federal Judge George Cosgrave ruled that Disney's copyright had been infringed, and prohibited Milton's creators from "employing or using or displaying the pictorial representation of 'Mickey Mouse' or any variation there so nearly similar as to be calculated to be mistaken for or confused with said pictorial representation of 'Mickey Mouse'."

The parties finally decided to settle the lawsuit on September 2, 1931. Despite the claims that Van Beuren had profited on the use of Mickey's image, the Disney studio simply asked Van Beuren to stop making any further cartoons featuring Milton and Rita. Roy O. Disney later said: "We just stopped him. That's all we were out to do. We didn't ask any damages. We even let him finish marketing his pictures. We wanted to establish our right. That's what we were after. To establish a copyright like that is a big thing and that's an important thing to do."

Milton Mouse wasn't the only cartoon character of the time to copy Mickey's look; in 1931, former Disney employees Hugh Harman and Rudolf Ising introduced a character named Foxy, a fox character who looked very much like Mickey but with slightly pointed ears and a fluffy tail. Foxy and his Minnie-lookalike girlfriend appeared in three 1931 Merrie Melodies cartoons produced by Harman-Ising Productions: Lady, Play Your Mandolin!, Smile, Darn Ya, Smile! and One More Time. Walt Disney personally asked Ising to stop using the lookalike character, and Ising acquiesced.

== Selected filmography ==
The following are the Milton Mouse shorts produced:

| Title | Release | Director | Distributor | Film | Notes |
|---|---|---|---|---|---|
| The Goose That Laid the Golden Egg | June 19, 1921 | Paul Terry | Pathé Exchange | Not Publicly Available | The Debut of Milton Mouse and the Aesop Fables Series. |
| Mice in Council | June 26, 1921 | Unknown | Pathé Exchange | | Retitled "Secret Council" for TV release. |
| Country Mouse and City Mouse | July 31, 1921 | Paul Terry | Pathé Exchange | Not Publicly Available | Also known as “The Country Mouse”. |
| The Romantic Mouse | October 22, 1922 | Paul Terry | Pathé Exchange | Not Publicly Available | |
| The Fortune Hunters | November 26, 1922 | John Foster, Harry Bailey, & Frank Moser | Pathé Exchange | Not Publicly Available | |
| Henry's Busted Romance | December 17, 1922 | Paul Terry | Pathé Exchange | | Retitled "Dream Girl" for TV release. |
| Cheating the Cheaters | January 21, 1923 | Paul Terry | Pathé Exchange | Not Publicly Available | |
| The Pearl Divers | August 12, 1923 | Unknown | Pathé Exchange | Not Available Online | |
| Sink or Swim | January 9, 1927 | Paul Terry | Pathé Exchange | Lost film | |
| The Mail Pilot | February 20, 1927 | Paul Terry & Harry Bailey | Pathé Exchange | Not Publicly Available. (In Original B&W Form) | Redrawn with color in the 1970s. Not to be confused with the 1933 Mickey Mouse short of the same name. |
| Horses, Horses, Horses | May 22, 1927 | Paul Terry | Pathé Exchange | Not Publicly Available | |
| The Big Tent | October 23, 1927 | Frank Moser & Paul Terry | Pathé Exchange | With TV Titles. | Retitled "Stars Of The Circus" for TV release. |
| Saved By a Keyhole | November 13, 1927 | Paul Terry | Pathé Exchange | Not Publicly Available | |
| On the Ice | March 11, 1928 | Paul Terry & Frank Moser | Pathé Exchange | Not Publicly Available | |
| Ride 'Em Cowboy | June 17, 1928 | Paul Terry & Frank Moser | Pathé Exchange | Not Publicly Available | |
| The Baby Show | July 15, 1928 | Unknown | Pathé Exchange | This Print Has The Wrong Title Card. Missing Scenes. | Missing some scenes. |
| Our Little Nell | August 5, 1928 | Unknown | Pathé Exchange | Not Publicly Available | |
| A Lad and His Lamp | March 10, 1929 | Paul Terry | Pathé Exchange | TV Release. | |
| The Enchanted Flute | August 11, 1929 | John Foster, Harry Bailey, & Frank Moser | Pathé Exchange | Not Publicly Available | |
| The Jungle Fool | September 15, 1929 | Mannie Davis & John Foster | Pathé Exchange | Japanese Airing. | |
| A Close Call | December 1, 1929 | Harry Bailey & John Foster | Pathé Exchange | | First cartoon featuring Milton & Rita Mouse in a more Mickey Mouse-like plot. |
| The Iron Man | January 19, 1930 | Harry Bailey & John Foster | Pathé Exchange | | Milton Mouse makes a cameo appearance in this short. |
| Singing Saps | February 7, 1930 | Mannie Davis & John Foster | Pathé Exchange | | Not to be confused with the Oswald short “The Singing Sap”, released the same year. |
| Western Whoopee | April 13, 1930 | Harry Bailey & John Foster | Pathé Exchange | | The first cartoon to be released with Milton & Rita's redesigns. |
| Hot Tamale | August 3, 1930 | John Foster | Pathé Exchange | | |
| Circus Capers | September 28, 1930 | Harry Bailey & John Foster | Pathé Exchange | | |
| The Office Boy | November 23, 1930 | Harry Bailey & John Foster | Pathé Exchange | | |
| Stone Age Stunts | December 7, 1930 | Mannie Davis & John Foster | Pathé Exchange | | |
| Cowboy Blues | February 15, 1931 | Harry Bailey & John Foster | RKO-Pathé Pictures | | The last cartoon that featured Milton Mouse's redesign. |
| Toy Time | January 27, 1932 | Harry Bailey, Mannie Davis, & John Foster | RKO Radio Pictures | | The final appearance of Milton Mouse. Retitled "Toyland Adventure" by Official Films for home movie release. |
