= Let a Smile Be Your Umbrella =

"Let a Smile Be Your Umbrella" is a popular song, first published in 1927. The music was written by Sammy Fain, and the lyrics by Irving Kahal and Francis Wheeler. It was the first collaboration between the Fain / Kahal team.

Successful early recordings were made by Roger Wolfe Kahn (vocal by Franklyn Baur) and by Sam Lanin (vocal by Irving Kaufman), and these both charted in 1928.

== Other notable recordings ==
The song has been recorded by multiple singers and bands since its release, with a flurry of recordings in the 1950s:

- 1928 Lee Morse and Her Bluegrass Boys - recorded for Columbia Records on January 23, 1928.
- 1949 The Andrews Sisters
- 1950 Jimmy Dorsey and His Original "Dorseyland" Jazz Band – included in the album Dorseyland Dance Parade, vocal by Claire "Shanty" Hogan.
- 1957 Bing Crosby included the song in his album Bing with a Beat.
- 1959 Perry Como - recorded for his album Como Swings.
- 1965 Bert Kaempfert and His Orchestra – included in their album Love Letters.

== Film appearances ==
- 1928 by Eddie White in a Vitaphone short film "I Thank You"
- 1929 It's a Great Life - performed by unseen male singer in the theater.
- 1932 The song is used in the Van Beuren cartoon The Wild Goose Chase.
- 1948 Give My Regards to Broadway
