= Dinner Time (film) =

1928 film

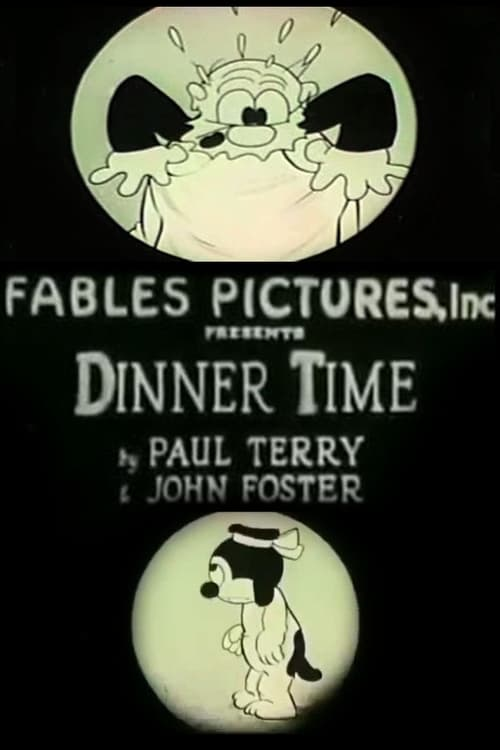
- Title card from the film
- Directed by: Paul Terry; John Foster
- Written by: Paul Terry; John Foster
- Produced by: Amadee J. Van Beuren
- Music by: Josiah Zuro
- Production company: Van Beuren Studios
- Distributed by: Pathé Exchange
- Release date: 1928
- Running time: 6 minutes
- Country: United States
- Language: English

The full film

Dinner Time is a 1928 American animated short subject produced by Amadee J. Van Beuren, directed by Paul Terry, co-directed by John Foster, and produced at Van Beuren Studios. Josiah Zuro arranged and conducted the "synchronized" music score. The film is part of a series entitled Aesop's Fables and features the Terry creation Farmer Al Falfa who works as a butcher, fending off a group of pesky dogs.

Dinner Time was one of the first publicly shown sound-on-film cartoons. It premiered at the Strand Theater New York City in August 1928 and was released by Pathé Exchange on October 14, a month before Walt Disney's sound cartoon, Steamboat Willie. Dinner Time was not successful with audiences and Disney's film would be widely touted as the first synchronized sound cartoon.

== Commonwealth reissue ==
In addition to the stock music cues from Thomas J. Valentino's music library, the 1950s Commonwealth reissue of this cartoon also has a narrator and voice actors. The voice actors spoke the characters' lines, as opposed to the nonsense vocalisations made in the original 1928 version. Some scenes were also reordered.

== See also ==
- Phonofilm
- Sound film
