= The Wild Goose Chase (1932 film) =

1932 film

- Directed by: John Foster; Mannie Davis
- Produced by: Amadee J. Van Beuren
- Color process: Black and white
- Production company: Van Beuren Studios
- Distributed by: RKO Radio Pictures
- Release date: August 12, 1932
- Running time: 6:03
- Language: English

The Wild Goose Chase is an animated short film made in 1932 by the Van Beuren Studios, and distributed by RKO Radio Pictures.

== Plot ==
The cartoon starts with a trio of frogs with banjos, singing the song Let a Smile Be Your Umbrella. Other creatures in the wild are shown during the rainy weather.

The scene, moments later, turns to a boy cat and a girl cat. The boy cat tries to cheer up his glum girlfriend using quotes from the song. In no time, the rains stops and they are elated. Just then, a tree stump comes to life and tells them there's a pot of gold in the castle up in the sky. When the boy cat asks how they could go there, the stump conjures a large goose which carries them to their destination.

As they enter the castle, they meet a spirit who is aware of their purpose. Frightened, they quickly flee the scene. Other inhabitants of the castle include imps, living skeletons, and other supernatural entities. After wandering around the place some more, they once again encountered the spirit who asks if they still want the pot of gold. When they insists, the spirit teleports the cats to the location of the pot.

Upon taking the treasure, the cats leap off an edge of the castle. As they drop, the giant goose reappears carrying them safely to the ground. The cats are overjoyed in taking the pot of gold. But their celebration is cut short when the pot suddenly disappears. When the boy cat is depressed, the girl cat cheers him up by singing some words from "Let a Smile Be Your Umbrella". Immediately the boy cat gets over his depression. They then embrace each other and sing the remaining lines.
