= Silvery Moon =

- Directed by: John Foster; Mannie Davis
- Produced by: Amadee J. Van Beuren
- Color process: Black and white
- Production company: Van Beuren Studios
- Distributed by: RKO Radio Pictures
- Release date: January 13, 1933
- Running time: 6:01
- Language: English

Silvery Moon, also known by its alternative title Candy Town, is a 1933 American Pre-Code animated short film by The Van Beuren Corporation and as part of the Aesop's Fables cartoon series. The story appears to be inspired by the story of Hansel and Gretel, published by the Brothers Grimm, albeit having a less dark scenario.

== Summary ==
In the title sequence, a man can be heard singing the first verse of the song "Moonlight Bay". The cartoon then opens with a feline couple boating in a bay. The boy cat paddles the boat while the girl cat sings the chorus of the aforementioned song. The boy cat tells his partner that the moon is made of cheese, but the girl cat objects and says it is made of cake, candy and ice cream. Appreciating their views, the moon becomes animated, and therefore conjures a stairway to it. The cats then walk up the steps.

The environment of the moon appears a lot like how the girl cat described it. Things like desserts are a common sight. After eating some of the scenery, the cats play some of the musical instruments which are also present. They then come to a table with fruits on top where they resume eating. Meanwhile, a hostile animated bottle of castor oil and spoon approach. Though they are stuffed with sweets, the cats are able to run. The bottle and spoon chase them across the lunar terrain until they decide to jump off an edge.

After leaping from the moon, the cats drop back into the bay but are unharmed. Near to them is their boat which they climb back on. Despite the frightening chase, the cats enjoyed the experience as they give thanks to the animated moon.
