= Circus Capers =

1930 animated film

- Circus Caper’s Title Card
- Directed by: Harry Bailey; John Foster
- Produced by: Amedee J. Van Beuren
- Music by: Gene Rodemich
- Color process: B&W
- Production company: The Van Beuren Corporation
- Distributed by: Pathé Exchange
- Release date: September 28, 1930
- Running time: 9:16
- Country: United States
- Language: English

Circus Capers is a 1930 animated short film made by The Van Beuren Corporation and distributed by Pathé Exchange. The film, which featured the characters Milton Mouse and Rita, the main characters in the Aesop shorts made in 1930, is part of the early sound cartoon series entitled Aesop's Sound Fables, though it is not based on an Aesop fable.

Released on September 28, 1930, it was one of the last cartoons to feature Milton and Rita before Van Beuren was sued by Disney to their similarity to Mickey and Minnie Mouse in 1931. The outcome of the lawsuit was that Van Beuren agreed to no longer use Milton and Rita in his Sound Fables.

== Plot ==
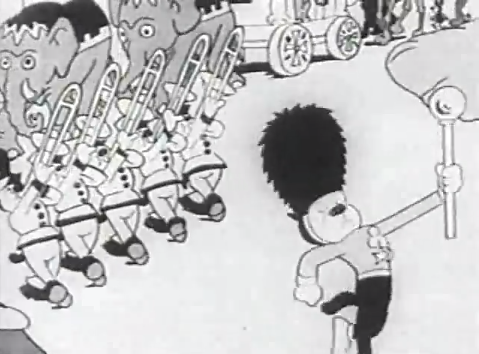
The marching band

The film begins with a circus parade, with a variety of dancing animals, and a trombone band. Once at the circus, the first sideshow is an obese lady in revealing clothing, which excites the crowd as they dash in after her when she goes into the circus hall.

The acts inside the circus are extraordinary, with a horse leaping from a high platform, Milton Mouse commanding a pack of lions, and the circus keeper dancing with a lion. However, in the third act, the circus keeper is kicked off the stage by the lion. Milton laughs at him off-stage, until the circus keeper snarls back at him.

The next act involves Milton as a human cannonball. For retaliation for everyone laughing at him, the circus keeper adds more gunpowder than necessary into Milton's cannon. This makes Milton fly out of the circus hall and into the sky.

The circus keeper then runs off with Milton's girlfriend Rita into a private wagon. However, Milton falls back into the same wagon as theirs, and discovers Rita kissing the circus-keeper. Saddened and shocked, Milton slowly walks out the wagon, before breaking down.

Then Milton sings Laugh, Clown, Laugh. This makes Rita reject the circus keeper and attempt to take back Milton. She is unsuccessful, as Milton rejects her by blowing a raspberry. Milton winks at the camera, ending the cartoon.

== Reception ==
Circus Capers was well received by the cinema magazines at that time. The Motion Picture News said that the film was "Enjoyable" and said that the film will be "fine in any spot where comedy is needed". The Film Daily said that the film was a "Good Aesop Fable" and also said that the mix of funny emotions and dramatic stuff "gets the laughs".
