= Frank Moser (animator) =

American artist and film director

Frank Moser (1886 – October 1, 1964) was an American artist, illustrator and film director who co-founded Terrytoons, the animation studio. Between 1916 and 1937, he directed 202 films. He died in Dobbs Ferry Hospital at the age of 78.

== Life ==
Moser was born at Oketo, Kansas, and studied art at the Art Students League and National Academy of Design there. He was a cartoonist for the Des Moines Register and Leader, where he drew editorial cartoons, and a regular feature called "In the Short Pants League", before going to New York City in 1916. In 1929, he and Paul Terry established 'Moser & Terry' to create Terrytoons. Moser was Terrytoons' most prolific animator, often responsible for nearly half of footage on each cartoon. He was also the only person beside Terry and musical director Philip A. Scheib to receive the on-screen credit in the earlier Terrytoons.

Moser painted landscapes in recent years and exhibited in galleries in New York City and Westchester County. He was a member of the Allied Artists of America, the American Water Color Society and the Salmagundi Club. He was one of the founding members and the first treasurer of the Hudson Valley Art Association and he was its historian until his death.
