= John Foster (cartoonist) =

American animator and film director

John Foster (November 27, 1886 – February 16, 1959), was an American animated film director. He is remembered for his direction in over a hundred films, including the Van Beuren Tom and Jerry series and the early (1928) sound-on-film cartoon "Dinner Time". Later in the 1930s, he created Gandy Goose for Terrytoons.
