= 1941 in animation =

Events in 1941 in animation.

== Events ==
=== January ===
- January 4: Chuck Jones' Elmer's Pet Rabbit premieres, produced by Leon Schlesinger Productions and starring Bugs Bunny and Elmer Fudd. Bugs' name was revealed in this cartoon.
- January 10: Jack King's Donald Duck cartoon Timber premieres, produced by Walt Disney Animation Studios. Also starring Pete.

=== February ===
- February 15: The following Tex Avery cartoons were released on the same day:
  - The Crackpot Quail
  - The Haunted Mouse
- February 27: 13th Academy Awards:
  - The Milky Way, directed by Rudolf Ising, produced by the Metro-Goldwyn-Mayer cartoon studio, wins the Academy Award for Best Animated Short Film. It is the first animated cartoon not produced by Disney to win an Oscar.
  - Pinocchio, produced by the Walt Disney Animation Studios, wins the Academy Award for Best Original Score, while When You Wish Upon a Star wins the Academy Award for Best Original Song.

=== March ===
- March 7: Wilfred Jackson's first Donald Duck cartoon Golden Eggs premieres, produced by Walt Disney Animation Studios.
- March 15: Tex Avery's Bugs Bunny cartoon Tortoise Beats Hare premieres, produced by Leon Schlesinger Productions. It marks the first time that Bugs Bunny loses, Cecil Turtle makes his debut.
- March 28: Scrub Me Mama with a Boogie Beat, directed and produced by Walter Lantz Productions, is first released. This short reel gained much controversy during its reissue in 1948 for heavy African American stereotyping as Lantz promised to never include the offensive racist content for his subsequent films after apologizing from this.

=== April ===
- April 11: The Fleischer Studios release an adaptation of Johnny Gruelle's children's stories, Raggedy Ann and Raggedy Andy.
- April 19: Tex Avery's Porky Pig cartoon Porky's Preview premieres, produced by Leon Schlesinger Productions, this was Avery's final short to star Porky.

=== May ===
- May 9: Dick Lundy's Donald Duck cartoon A Good Time for a Dime premieres, produced by Walt Disney Animation Studios. Daisy Duck makes a cameo in this short.
- May 24: Tex Avery's Hollywood Steps Out, produced by Leon Schlesinger Productions, is first released. It features caricatures of Hollywood stars.
- May 29: Disney animators' strike: At the Walt Disney Animation Studios a five-week strike breaks out to ask for higher payment and privileges. While the demands are eventually met, several animators are either fired by Disney or quit.

=== June ===
- June 7: Friz Freleng's first Bugs Bunny cartoon Hiawatha's Rabbit Hunt premieres, produced by Leon Schlesinger Productions. This short was nominated for an Academy Award.
- June 20:
  - The Reluctant Dragon, a live-action film with animated scenes by Jack Cutting, Ub Iwerks, Hamilton Luske and Jack Kinney, produced by Walt Disney Animation, premieres. It features three shorts within the feature film, Baby Weems, How To Ride a Horse starring Goofy, and The Reluctant Dragon.
  - Riley Thomson's The Nifty Nineties premieres, produced by Walt Disney Animation Studios, starring Mickey Mouse and Minnie Mouse.

=== July ===
- July 2: Tex Avery is suspended from Leon Schlesinger Productions for four weeks with no pay by Leon Schlesinger due to a quarrel over the Bugs Bunny cartoon The Heckling Hare. He then leaves for Paramount Pictures and begins a series of short films known as Speaking of Animals, beginning with Down on the Farm.
- July 5: Tex Avery's The Heckling Hare, produced by Leon Schlesinger Productions, starring Bugs Bunny & Willoughby, is first released.
- July 7: With Woody Woodpecker, Woody Woodpecker's second film appearance, produced by Walter Lantz, the bird becomes star of his own long-running animated series.
- July 11: Jack King's Donald Duck cartoon Early to Bed premieres, produced by Walt Disney Animation Studios.
- July 19: William Hanna & Joseph Barbera's The Midnight Snack premieres, produced by MGM's Cartoon Studio. This is the second cartoon to star Tom and Jerry, and the first in which they are officially named. Also starring Mammy Two Shoes.

=== August ===
- August 1: Jack King's Donald Duck cartoon Truant Officer Donald premieres, produced by Walt Disney Animation Studios. Also starring Huey, Dewey, and Louie.
- August 2: Tex Avery's Aviation Vacation, produced by Leon Schlesinger Productions, premieres.
- August 11: The Screwdriver, produced by Walter Lantz, is released, being the last Woody Woodpecker cartoon featuring Mel Blanc as Woody's voice. Afterwards Leon Schlesinger Productions takes an exclusivity contract on Blanc's voice.
- August 30: Bob Clampett's The Henpecked Duck is first released, starring Daffy Duck, produced by Leon Schlesinger Productions.

=== September ===
- September 2: Tex Avery joins Metro-Goldwyn-Mayer's cartoon studio.
- September 12: Jack King's Donald Duck cartoon Old MacDonald Duck premieres, produced by Walt Disney Animation Studios.
- September 13: Tex Avery's All This and Rabbit Stew, starring Bugs Bunny, produced by Leon Schlesinger Productions, premieres. This was the final Bugs Bunny cartoon to be directed by Avery. This cartoon later became a part of the "Censored Eleven" due to the Hunter featured in this short being a stereotypical & offensive description of Blackface.
- September 26: Paramount Pictures launches an animated film series based on Superman, produced by Fleischer Studios, which kicks off with the first film Superman.

=== October ===
- October 3: Lend a Paw, starring Pluto, directed by Clyde Geronimi, produced by the Walt Disney Studios, is first released.
- October 11: Tex Avery's The Bug Parade, produced by Leon Schlesinger Productions, premieres. This was Avery's final short for Warner Bros..
- October 23: Ben Sharpsteen, Norman Ferguson, Wilfred Jackson, Bill Roberts, Jack Kinney and Samuel Armstrong's Dumbo, produced by Walt Disney Animation Studios, is first released. It becomes a surprise box office hit, helping Disney win back some of their financial losses caused by World War II cutting off their European market.
- October 24: Dick Lundy's Donald Duck cartoon Donald's Camera premieres, produced by Walt Disney Animation Studios.

=== November ===
- November 14: Jack Kinney's Goofy cartoon The Art of Skiing, produced by Walt Disney Animation Studios, premieres. This also marks the debut of the Goofy holler sound effect, provided by Hannes Schroll.
- November 19:
  - In China Wan Guchan and Wan Laiming release Princess Iron Fan, the first Chinese animated feature film.
  - The National Film Board of Canada releases The Thrifty Pig, a cartoon by the Walt Disney Studios about the importance of war bonds.
- November 22: Bob Clampett's (initially planned by Tex Avery) The Cagey Canary, produced by Leon Schlesinger Productions, premieres.
- November 24: Pantry Panic starring Woody Woodpecker, directed and produced by Walter Lantz, premieres.

=== December ===
- December 4: The Fleischer Studios release their second animated feature film Mr. Bug Goes to Town which becomes such a colossal flop that the studio goes bankrupt.
- December 5:
  - Jack King's Donald Duck cartoon Chef Donald premieres, produced by Walt Disney Animation Studios.
  - The Color Rhapsody The Fox and the Grapes, produced by Screen Gems and directed by Frank Tashlin, is first released and marks the debut of the Fox and the Crow.
- December 6:
  - Friz Freleng's Rhapsody in Rivets premieres, produced by Leon Schlesinger Productions.
  - William Hanna and Joseph Barbera's Tom and Jerry cartoon The Night Before Christmas premieres, produced by MGM's Cartoon Studio. This was the first short in the series to end with the titular Cat and Mouse being on good terms with each other.
- December 12: The National Film Board of Canada releases Richard Lyford's 7 Wise Dwarfs, produced by the Walt Disney Animation studios, to educate audiences on war bonds.
- December 20: Bob Clampett's (initially planned by Tex Avery) Bugs Bunny and Elmer Fudd cartoon Wabbit Twouble, produced by Leon Schlesinger Productions, premieres. This short introduces a fat version of Elmer, and he would appear like that for 3 more cartoons. The scene where Bugs inflates himself and imitates Elmer became a popular internet meme over 75 years later titled "Big Chungus".
- December 26: Jack Kinney's Goofy cartoon The Art of Self Defense, produced by Walt Disney Animation Studios, premieres.

=== Specific date unknown ===
- Roberto Sgrilli creates the animated short Il Barone di Münchhausen.

== Films released ==
- January 1 - Princess Iron Fan (China)
- July 21 - The Reluctant Dragon (United States)
- October 23 - Dumbo (United States)
- December 5 - Mr. Bug Goes to Town (United States)

== Births ==
=== January ===
- January 1: Asrani, Indian actor (Hindi dub voice of Zazu in The Lion King), (d. 2025).
- January 5: Hayao Miyazaki, Japanese animator, director, producer, screenwriter, author and manga artist (co-founder of Studio Ghibli).
- January 8:
  - Graham Chapman, English actor and comedian (occasional voices in Terry Gilliam's animated shorts in Monty Python's Flying Circus and the film spin-offs), (d. 1989).
  - Star Wirth, American xerographer (Hanna-Barbera, The Pagemaster, Warner Bros. Animation), (d. 2012).
- January 11: Motosuke Takahashi, Japanese film director, animator, character designer and storyboard artist (Tatsunoko Productions, Studio Pierrot), (d. 2007).
- January 12: Long John Baldry, English-Canadian singer and voice actor (voice of Dr. Robotnik in Adventures of Sonic the Hedgehog, Mistle Toad in Toad Patrol, Komplex in Bucky O'Hare and the Toad Wars), (d. 2005).
- January 21: Victoria Carroll, American actress (voice of Amelia Chronos in The Mask: Animated Series, Fortius in Izzy's Quest for Olympic Gold, Grace in the TaleSpin episode "Waiders of the Lost Treasure", Pomona in the Chip 'n Dale: Rescue Rangers episode "Dirty Rotten Diapers", Boom Boom Beagle in the DuckTales episode "The Good Muddahs", She-Hulk in The Incredible Hulk episode "Enter: She-Hulk", Kangaroo Waitress in The 13 Ghosts of Scooby-Doo episode "Scooby in Kwackyland").
- January 22: Rintaro, Japanese director (Galaxy Express 999, Metropolis).
- January 24: Gary K. Wolf, American author (Who Framed Roger Rabbit).
- January 31:
  - Gerald McDermott, American film director, children's book writer and illustrator, (d. 2012).
  - Ron Thompson, American actor (voice of Tony and Pete in American Pop, Cops in Last Days of Coney Island), (d. 2024).
  - Jessica Walter, American actress (voice of Ashley Walker-Club-Dupree in The Magic School Bus, Demoness in The Life and Times of Juniper Lee, Old One in The Land Before Time, Malory Archer in Archer, Mrs. Wyatt in Scooby-Doo! Mystery Incorporated, Tabitha in Turbo: F.A.S.T., Miss Heinous in Star vs. the Forces of Evil, Granny Goodness in Harley Quinn, Athena in the Justice League Action episode "The Trouble With Truth"), (d. 2021).

=== February ===
- February 11: Sergio Mendes, Brazilian musician (voice of Samba School Director in Rio, Street Vendor in Rio 2, composed songs for both films), (d. 2024).

=== March ===
- March 5: Errol Le Cain, English children's book illustrator and animator (worked for Richard Williams), (d. 1989).
- March 9: Tsutomu Shibayama, Japanese anime director (Doraemon, Ranma ½), animator (God Mazinger) and storyboard artist (Doraemon, Ranma ½), (d. 2026).
- March 16: Chuck Woolery, American game show host and musician (voiced himself in The Cleveland Show episode "Love Rollercoaster"), (d. 2024).
- March 23: Zsolt Richly, Hungarian animator (Pannonia Film Studio, A Kockásfülű nyúl), (d. 2020).
- March 24: David Fox, Canadian actor (voice of Captain Haddock in The Adventures of Tintin, Sentinels and Master Mold in X-Men), (d. 2021).
- March 28:
  - Charles Swenson, American animator (Down and Dirty Duck, Twice Upon a Time, Teenage Mutant Ninja Turtles, Rugrats, Mike, Lu & Og).
  - Alf Clausen, American composer (The Simpsons, The Critic, Space Cats) (d. 2025).
- March 29: John W. Hyde, American producer (Mighty Mouse: The New Adventures, Film Roman, Harriet the Spy).
- March 30: Graeme Edge, English musician, songwriter and poet (voiced himself in The Simpsons episode "Viva Ned Flanders"), (d. 2021).

=== April ===
- April 2: Dr. Demento, American radio broadcaster and record collector (voiced himself in the Bobby's World episode "Bobby's Big Boo-Boo", and The Simpsons episode "Sideshow Bob Roberts").
- April 7: Danny Wells, Canadian actor (voice of Bush and Raul in Heathcliff, Luigi in The Super Mario Bros. Super Show!, King Hugo III in Potatoes and Dragons, Gus in Willa's Wild Life), (d. 2013).
- April 13: Arvo Nuut, Estonian film operator and film producer (Tallinnfilm, Nukufilm), (d. 2021).
- April 18: Phillip Young, American animator (Walt Disney Animation Studios, Sinbad: Legend of the Seven Seas, Looney Tunes: Back in Action), (d. 2021).
- April 28:
  - Ann-Margret, Swedish-American actress, singer, and dancer (portrayed Bebe DeBarge in Happy!, voice of Ann-Margrock in The Flintstones episode "Ann-Margrock Presents").
  - Mike Renzi, American composer, music director, pianist and jazz musician (Sesame Street), (d. 2021).

=== May ===
- May 4:
  - Jannik Hastrup, Danish writer, director, producer, illustrator and animator (Benny's Bathtub, Samson & Sally, War of the Birds).
  - John Kimball, American animator (Raggedy Ann & Andy: A Musical Adventure, A Special Valentine with the Family Circus, Ruby-Spears Enterprises, Heidi's Song, directed the main titles for Teacher's Pet), storyboard artist (Darkwing Duck, Gargoyles), sheet timer (Disney Television Animation) and director (Ruby-Spears Enterprises, Hanna-Barbera, Disney Television Animation, ChalkZone).
- May 6: William Moritz, American animation film historian, (d. 2004).
- May 13: Dwi Koendoro, Indonesian comics artist, animator (made an animated series based on his comics series Legenda Sawung Kampret) and film producer (head of Indonesian Animation Association), (d. 2019).
- May 18: Miriam Margolyes, English-Australian actress (portrayed Grandma Rosy in Balto, and Aunt Sponge in James and the Giant Peach, voice of the Matchmaker in Mulan, Mrs. Plithiver in Legend of the Guardians: The Owls of Ga'Hoole, Queen Oofeefa in Early Man, Shirley Finster in Rugrats, Giraffe and Squirrel in Tinga Tinga Tales, Nana in Nina Needs to Go!, Bessie in the 101 Dalmatian Street episode "A Summer to Remember", Astrid in Hilda).
- May 23: Nicole Jaffe, Canadian actress (original voice of Velma Dinkley in Scooby-Doo).
- May 24: Larry Leichliter, American animator (Bill Melendez Productions, Rock-A-Doodle, A Troll in Central Park), storyboard artist (Hey Arnold!), character designer (Aladdin), sheet timer (Nickelodeon Animation Studio, Cartoon Network Studios, Baby Looney Tunes, Danger Rangers, Gravity Falls, Bee and PuppyCat, Go! Cartoons), animatic editor (Party Wagon), overseas supervisor (You're in the Super Bowl, Charlie Brown, CatDog), producer (ChalkZone) and director (Spider-Man, Nickelodeon Animation Studio, Cartoon Network Studios, Peanuts specials, Sofia the First, Bee and PuppyCat).
- May 30: Yuji Ohno, Japanese composer (Lupin III, Space Adventure Cobra, Mighty Orbots), (d. 2026).
- May 31: Nicole Van Goethem, Belgian cartoonist, animator and film director (A Greek Tragedy), (d. 2000).

=== June ===
- June 1: Richard Donat, Canadian actor (voice of Deej in Star Wars: Ewoks, Big Hawk in Trailer Park Boys: The Animated Series), (d. 2026).
- June 2:
  - Jeff Winkless, American voice actor (d. 2006).
  - Stacy Keach, American actor (voice of Phantasm and Carl Beaumont in Batman: Mask of the Phantasm, Howard Duff in The Simpsons, Skipper Riley in Planes and Planes: Fire & Rescue, Robert Vance in the Batman Beyond episode "Lost Soul", Marvin Finster in Rugrats, Roland De Fleures in The Zeta Project episode "The Next Gen", Mayor and Harold Lind in What's New Scooby-Doo?, Narrator in A Turtle's Tale: Sammy's Adventures), (d. 2026).
- June 4: Jackie Banks, American animation checker and scene planner (Hanna-Barbera, This Is America, Charlie Brown, The Simpsons, Tom and Jerry: The Movie), (d. 1995).
- June 15: Neal Adams, American comic book artist (DC Comics) and writer (Bucky O'Hare and the Toad Wars), (d. 2022).
- June 19:
  - Masao Maruyama, Japanese anime producer and entrepreneur (Madhouse, MAPPA, Studio M2).
  - Linda Dangcil, American actress (voice of Carmen Alonso / Raya in Jem, Homeless Woman in the Static Shock episode "Frozen Out", additional voices in A Pup Named Scooby-Doo), (d. 2009).
- June 21: Joe Flaherty, American actor, comedian (portrayed Count Floyd in The Completely Mental Misadventures of Ed Grimley, voice of Lawyer and General in Heavy Metal, Big Dracula in Little Dracula, Hooft in The Legend of Tarzan, Snorkel in The Santa Claus Brothers, Cloaked Skull in Teamo Supremo, Jeb in Home on the Range, Western Union Manager, Don Knotts' Assistant and Vatican Messenger in Family Guy, Abe's Foster Dad in Clone High, Car Door Owner in the American Dad! episode "Delorean Story-An"), and television writer (wrote the Scooby-Doo! Mystery Incorporated episode "Theater of Doom"), (d. 2024).
- June 22: Michael Lerner, American actor (voice of Mayor Ebert in Godzilla: The Series, Producer in 101 Dalmatians II: Patch's London Adventure), (d. 2023).
- June 29: Chieko Baisho, Japanese actress and singer (voice of Sophie in Howl's Moving Castle).

=== July ===
- July 5: Terry Cashman, American record producer and singer-songwriter (performed the song "Talkin' Softball" in The Simpsons episode "Homer at the Bat").
- July 7: Bill Oddie, English actor (voice of Sweep in The Willows in Winter, Crow, Chief O'Reilly, Doctor Gloom and Rembrandt in Bananaman, English dub voice of Asterix in Asterix and the Big Fight), (d. 2026).
- July 9: Hisayuki Toriumi, Japanese animator (Tatsunoko Production, Sunrise, Studio Pierrot), film director and producer (Science Ninja Team Gatchaman), screenwriter and novelist, (d. 2009).
- July 10:
  - Robert Pine, American actor (voice of Octavio in Elena of Avalor, Bishop in Frozen, Santa Peterson in the Rocket Power episode "A Rocket X-Mas", Fisherman in the Avatar: The Last Airbender episode "The Storm").
  - Francisco Reséndez, Mexican voice actor (Latin American dub voice of Scooby-Doo in the Scooby-Doo franchise, Mario in the Donkey Kong segment of Saturday Supercade, Ambrose Bandenham in Central Park, Wonder Dog in Super Friends, Tonbee in Naruto, Makarov Dreyar in Fairy Tail, Dot Pyxis in Attack on Titan, and writer for the Latin American dub of The Simpsons), (d. 2026).
  - Ian Whitcomb, English entertainer, singer-songwriter, composer (Bugs Bunny: Superstar), record producer, writer, broadcaster and actor (voice of the Narrator in A Christmas Carol), (d. 2020).
- July 13: Robert Forster, American actor (voice of Major Forsberg in Todd McFarlane's Spawn, The President in Justice League Unlimited, Jack J. Kurtzman in Teenage Mutant Ninja Turtles, Jack Chapman and Police Officer in the Godzilla: The Series episode "Wedding Bells Blew", Lucky Jim in The Simpsons episode "Sex, Pies and Idiot Scrapes", General Bryce in the Transformers: Prime episode "Grill"), (d. 2019).
- July 17: Paula Shaw, American actress (voice of Bubbie in The Guava Juice Show), (d. 2025).
- July 22: George Clinton, American singer, songwriter, record producer and bandleader (voice of King Quincy in Trolls World Tour.)
- July 24: Marc Strange, Canadian actor (voice of Forge in X-Men: The Animated Series, Lord Glenn in Silver Surfer), (d. 2012).
- July 28:
  - Dianne Jackson, English film director (The Snowman), (d. 1992).
  - Peter Cullen, Canadian-American voice actor (voice of Optimus Prime in the Transformers franchise, Eeyore in the Winnie the Pooh, franchise, Murky Dismal in Rainbow Bite, Venger in Dungeons & Dragons, Hulk, Red Skull and Mysterio in Spider-Man and His Amazing Friends, Mario in the Donkey Kong segment of Saturday Supercade, Captain Slaughter in Pound Puppies, Bankjob Beagle and Admiral Grimitz in DuckTales, Coran and Narrator in Voltron: Defender of the Universe, announcer for Toonami, original voice of Monterey Jack in Chip n' Dale Rescue Rangers), (d. 2026).
- July 29: David Warner, English actor (voice of Ra's al Ghul in the DC Animated Universe, the Lobe in Freakazoid! and the Teen Titans Go! episode "Huggbees", the Master Control Program in Tron, Rob/Dr. Wrecker in The Amazing World of Gumball, Alpha in Men in Black: The Series, Victor Frankenstein in Toonsylvania, Lord Angstrom in Buzz Lightyear of Star Command, Nergal in Grim & Evil, Duke Richard of Lionsgate, Krasus, Sir Morgan and Maldon's Commander in The Legend of Prince Valiant, Herbert Landon and Red Skull in Spider-Man, Archmage in Gargoyles, Old Man and Oldsy in What's New, Scooby-Doo?, Talon in the Mighty Max episode "Souls of Talon", Zarm in the Captain Planet and the Planeteers episode "The Dream Machine", Ice Breaker in the Biker Mice from Mars episode "Below the Horizon", the Glyph in the Captain Simian & the Space Monkeys episode "Rhesus Pieces", Arthur Dearborn in the Iron Man episode "Cell of Iron", narrator in Pooh's Grand Adventure: The Search for Christopher Robin and A Valentine for You), (d. 2022).
- July 30: Paul Anka, Canadian-American singer, songwriter, and actor (voiced himself in The Simpsons episode "Treehouse of Horror VI").

=== August ===
- August 4:
  - Martin Jarvis, English actor and producer (voice of Saitine in Wreck-It Ralph, Alfred Pennyworth in Batman: Assault on Arkham, continued voice of Nergal in The Grim Adventures of Billy & Mandy).
  - Richard Trueblood, American animator (Hanna-Barbera, The Nine Lives of Fritz the Cat, The Mouse and His Child, A Family Circus Christmas, Filmation), storyboard artist (Maxie's World, Goof Troop, Sonic the Hedgehog, Bonkers), sheet timer (Little Nemo: Adventures in Slumberland, Disney Television Animation, DuckTales the Movie: Treasure of the Lost Lamp, Animaniacs, DIC Entertainment, The Incredible Hulk, Adelaide Productions, All Dogs Go to Heaven: The Series, Histeria!, The Secret of NIMH 2: Timmy to the Rescue, The Wild Thornberrys, The New Woody Woodpecker Show, The Oblongs, Courage the Cowardly Dog, Clifford's Really Big Movie), producer (Attack of the Killer Tomatoes, Space Cats, Bonkers, Fantastic Four) and director (Filmation, Garbage Pail Kids, Teenage Mutant Ninja Turtles, Disney Television Animation, Biker Mice from Mars, Iron Man, The Incredible Hulk, Dexter's Laboratory), (d. 2019).
- August 8: Earl Boen, American actor (voice of Red Skull and the Beyonder in Spider-Man, Santa Claus in A Pinky and the Brain Christmas and A Johnny Bravo Christmas, Leonard Kanifky in Bonkers, Rhino in Batman: The Animated Series, Horace Bleakman in Clifford the Big Red Dog, Captain Montecero in The New Adventures of Zorro, Doctor, Monster, Mr. Hobson and TV Narrator in Grim & Evil and The Grim Adventures of Billy & Mandy, Mr. Gordon and The Ghost of Chef Pierre Goulash in the A Pup Named Scooby-Doo episode "Robopup", Vice President Obsequious in The Sylvester & Tweety Mysteries episode "Spooker of the House", Simon Stagg in the Justice League episode "Metamorphosis", William Howard Taft in the Time Squad episode "White House Weirdness", Nick in the Buzz Lightyear of Star Command episode "Holiday Time", continued voice of Senor Senior Sr. in Kim Possible, additional voices in Bruno the Kid, The Fantastic Voyages of Sinbad the Sailor, What-a-Mess, Capitol Critters, Problem Child and The Addams Family), (d. 2023).
- August 14: David Crosby, American singer, guitarist, and songwriter (voiced himself in The Simpsons episodes "Marge in Chains" and "Homer's Barbershop Quartet"), (d. 2023)..
- August 16: Paul Hecht, English-born Canadian actor (voice of the title character in Johnny Cypher in Dimension Zero, Army Veterinarian in My Dog Tulip, additional voices in Courage the Cowardly Dog).
- August 29: Robin Leach, English entertainment reporter and writer (voice of TV Host in the Garfield and Friends episode "Fat and Furry", Chamberlain in the Happily Ever After: Fairy Tales for Every Child episode "The Empress' Nightingale", himself in the Family Guy episode "Peter, Peter, Caviar Eater"), (d. 2018).

=== September ===
- September 10: Stephen Jay Gould, American paleontologist, evolutionary biologist and science historian (voiced himself in The Simpsons episode "Lisa the Skeptic"), (d. 2002).
- September 14: Yuri Norstein, Soviet and Russian animator (Hedgehog in the Fog, Tale of Tales, The Overcoat).
- September 16: David Hemblen, English-born Canadian actor (voice of Magneto in X-Men, Vault-Keeper in Tales from the Cryptkeeper, Asmodeus in Redwall, The Night Master in Yin Yang Yo!), (d. 2020).
- September 24: Linda McCartney, American photographer and activist (voiced herself in The Simpsons episode "Lisa the Vegetarian", Welhelmina in Tropic Island Hum), (d. 1998).

=== October ===
- October 8: Jesse Jackson, American civil rights activist and politician (voice of Cocky Locky in the Happily Ever After: Fairy Tales for Every Child episode "Henny Penny"), (d. 2026).
- October 9: Warren Luening, American musician and trumpeter (Walt Disney Animation Studios, The Nightmare Before Christmas, A Goofy Movie, Casper, Pixar, Space Jam, Anastasia, Family Guy, Stuart Little 2, Looney Tunes: Back in Action, The Polar Express, Ice Age: The Meltdown, The Ant Bully, Teen Titans: Trouble in Tokyo, The Simpsons Movie, Horton Hears a Who!, Shrek Forever After, Alvin and the Chipmunks: Chipwrecked, Despicable Me 2), (d. 2012).
- October 21: Marcell Jankovics, Hungarian graphic artist, film director and author (Sisyphus, The Struggle), (d. 2021).
- October 23: Mel Winkler, American actor (voice of Lucius Fox in The New Batman Adventures, Johnny the snowman in Oswald, Commissioner Henderson in the Superman: The Animated Series episode "Feeding Time"), (d. 2020).
- October 25:
  - Helen Reddy, Australian-American pop singer and actress (portrayed Nora in Pete's Dragon, voiced herself in Family Guy), (d. 2020).
  - Gordon Tootoosis, Saskatchewan actor (voice of Kekata in Pocahontas, Mushom in Wapos Bay, Gordy in Open Season), (d. 2011).
- October 31: Sally Kirkland, American actress (voice of Older Woman in Nerdland), (d. 2025).

=== November ===
- November 1: Robert Foxworth, American actor (voice of Professor Hamilton in Justice League Unlimited, Race Bannon in season 2 of The Real Adventures of Jonny Quest).
- November 5: Yoshiyuki Tomino, Japanese anime creator, animator, director, screenwriter, songwriter and novelist (creator of the Gundam franchise).
- November 8: Julian Antonisz, Polish film director (Sun: A Non-Camera Film 1977, aka Słońce - film bez kamery), (d. 1987).
- November 11: Russell Horton, American actor (voice of Kat's Father in Kenny the Shark, continued voice of the Trix Rabbit).
- November 12: Dave Brain, American animator (Hanna-Barbera, Marvel Productions), storyboard artist (Darkwing Duck, Space Cats, Garfield and Friends, Cow and Chicken, Family Guy), director (Film Roman, Cow and Chicken, I Am Weasel, Grim & Evil, ChalkZone, Johnny Bravo) and sheet timer (Disney Television Animation, Teenage Mutant Ninja Turtles, The Mask, Life with Louie, King of the Hill, Warner Bros. Animation, Men in Black: The Series, Jackie Chan Adventures).
- November 20: Dr. John, American singer and songwriter (voice of The Sun in Whoopi's Littleburg, performed the theme songs of Whoopi's Littleburg and Curious George, and "Down in New Orleans" in The Princess and the Frog), (d. 2019).
- November 22: Cilia van Dijk, Dutch film producer (Anna & Bella), (d. 2023).
- November 23:
  - Eduard Nazarov, Russian animator, children's book illustrator and voice actor (Once Upon a Dog), (d. 2016).
  - Franco Nero, Italian actor, producer, and director (voice of Uncle Topolino in Cars 2).
- November 24: Simon Singer, American actor (voice of Slightly in Peter Pan).
- November 28: Shannon Farnon, Canadian actress (voice of Kim Butler in Valley of the Dinosaurs, Wonder Woman in Super Friends).

=== December ===
- December 9: Beau Bridges, American actor (voice of Sheriff Scaly Briggs in Penn Zero: Part-Time Hero, Yoshio Onodera in From Up on Poppy Hill, Prince Kuramochi in The Tale of the Princess Kaguya).
- December 10:
  - Fionnula Flanagan, Irish actress (voice of Granny and Macha in Song of the Sea).
  - Joachim Kerzel, German actor (German dub voice of AUTO in WALL-E), (d. 2026).
  - Chad Stuart, English singer and actor (voice of Flaps the vulture in The Jungle Book), (d. 2020).
- December 25: John Capodice, American actor (voice of Cab Driver in Teenage Mutant Ninja Turtles: Mutant Mayhem, Cabbie and Johnny in the Aaahh!!! Real Monsters episode "A Room With No Viewfinder/Krumm Rises to the Top", Caesar Carlini in the Superman: The Animated Series episode "World's Finest"), (d. 2024).
- December 29: Ray Thomas, English multi-instrumentalist, flautist, singer and member of The Moody Blues (voiced himself in The Simpsons episode "Viva Ned Flanders"), (d. 2018).

=== Specific date unknown ===
- Joan C. Gratz, American artist, animator, and filmmaker (Will Vinton Productions, Mona Lisa Descending a Staircase).
- Barry Otto, Australian actor (voice of Mayor Wilberforce Cranklepot in Blinky Bill the Movie and Echidna in Legend of the Guardians: The Owls of Ga'Hoole).

== Deaths ==
=== April ===
- April 25: Alexander Shiryaev, Russian animation director, ballet dancer, ballet master and choreographer, (grom 1906 to 1909, Shiryaev produced a number of pioneering stop motion and traditionally animated films. He recreated various ballets by staging them through using hand-made dolls which he created from either clay or papier-mâché; they were 20–25 cm (7.9–9.8 in) tall, and their body parts were connected by thin wire which provided plasticity. He then filmed them on camera, frame by frame. In the process he also made thousands of sketches, catching every movement, also turning them into a filming reel so that one could watch the entire dance in the form of a cartoon. dies at age 73.

=== July ===
- July 15: Walter Ruttmann, German film director and cinematographer (pioneer of abstract animation, directed the animated short film Lichtspiel: Opus I, the "oldest fully abstract motion picture known to survive, using only animated geometric forms, arranged and shown without reference to any representational imagery"; served as a special effects artist in the animated feature film The Adventures of Prince Achmed, making the film's moving backgrounds and magic scenes), dies at age 53.

=== August ===
- August 5: Barnett Parker, British actor (voice of the title character in The Reluctant), dies at age 54.
- August 13: J. Stuart Blackton, British-American silent film producer and director (co-founder of the film studio Vitagraph Studios, one of the first filmmakers to use the techniques of stop-motion and drawn animation, considered a father of American animation, directed the animated films The Enchanted Drawing, Humorous Phases of Funny Faces, The Haunted Hotel, and The Humpty Dumpty Circus), dies at age 66.

=== October ===
- October 8: Win Smith, Canadian-American animator and comics artist (Penguin Pete, Looney Luke, Mickey Mouse, Looney Tunes), dies at age 53.

=== Specific date unknown ===
- Charles Barker Howdill, English architect, photographer, and traveler, (he gave hundreds of illustrated magic lantern lectures about his journeys. He was among the first photographers to exhibit colour photographs at the Royal Photographic Society), dies at an unknown age.

== See also ==
- List of anime by release date (1939–1945)
