= 1875 in animation =

Events in 1875 in animation.

== Events ==
- Specific date unknown:
  - In 1875, the physiologist Sigmund Exner showed that, under the right conditions, people will see two quick, spatially separated but stationary electrical sparks as a single light moving from place to place, while quicker flashes were interpreted as motion between two stationary lights. Exner argued that the impression of the moving light was a perception (from a mental process) of the motion between the stationary lights as pure sense. This is an explanation of the optical illusion of illusory motion known as the beta movement. The illusion of motion caused by animation and film is sometimes believed to rely on beta movement, as an alternative to the older explanation known as persistence of vision.
  - The French astronomer Pierre Janssen introduces the chronophotography instrument Janssen revolver to the Société Francaise de Photographie. Etienne-Jules Marey would later use Janssen's invention as the primary inspiration for his chronophotographic gun (1882), a precursor to the camcorder.The functioning of the chronophotographic gun is very similar to a normal rifle, with grip, canon and rotating drum, except that it does not carry bullets but photographic plates with which it caught the light at high speed.

== Births ==
=== January ===
- January 5: J. Stuart Blackton, British-American silent film producer and director (co-founder of the film studio Vitagraph Studios, one of the first filmmakers to use the techniques of stop-motion and drawn animation, considered a father of American animation, directed the animated films The Enchanted Drawing, Humorous Phases of Funny Faces, The Haunted Hotel, and The Humpty Dumpty Circus), (d. 1941).
- January 21: Paul E. Kahle, German orientalist, (discovered leather puppets near Damietta, Egypt which were used in medieval shadow plays, one of the precursors of silhouette animation), (d. 1964).

=== June ===
- June 4: Albert E. Smith, English-American film director, film producer, and stage magician, (co-founder of the film studio Vitagraph Studios, producer of the animated short film The Humpty Dumpty Circus), (d. 1958).

=== October ===
- October 31: Carl Edouarde, American composer (Steamboat Willie), (d. 1932).
