= 1908 in animation =

Events in 1908 in animation.

== Films released ==
- April 25 – The Airship, or 100 Years Hence (United States)
- August 17 – Fantasmagorie (France)
- October 31 – Hôtel électrique (France)

== Births ==
=== January ===
- January 7: Eliot Daniel, American songwriter (Walt Disney Company), (d. 1997).
- January 11: Lionel Stander, American actor (voice of Buzz Buzzard in Woody Woodpecker, Kup in The Transformers: The Movie), (d. 1994).
- January 16: Ethel Merman, American actress and singer (portrayed herself and sang in 3 Betty Boop cartoons, voice of Mombi in Journey Back to Oz, Lilly Loraine in Rudolph and Frosty's Christmas in July), (d. 1984).
- January 19: Jack Cutting, American animator and film director (Walt Disney Company), (d. 1988).

=== February ===
- February 1: George Pal, Hungarian-American animator, film director, special effects maker and film producer (Puppetoons, Tulips Shall Grow, John Henry and the Inky-Poo, Tubby the Tuba), (d. 1980).
- February 6: Michael Maltese, American screenwriter (Warner Bros. Cartoons, Hanna-Barbera) and comics writer, (d. 1981).
- February 26: Tex Avery, American animator, cartoonist, film director, and voice actor (Warner Bros. Cartoons, Metro-Goldwyn-Mayer cartoon studio), creator or further developer of several characters (Bugs Bunny, Daffy Duck, Porky Pig, Elmer Fudd, Droopy, Screwy Squirrel, The Big Bad Wolf, Red Hot Riding Hood, and George and Junior), (d. 1980).

=== March ===
- March 11: Frank Smith, American animator and comics artist (Walt Disney Company, Harman-Ising), (d. 1986).
- March 13: Paul Stewart, American actor (voice of Mighty Mightor), (d. 1986).
- March 16: Seymour Kneitel, American animator (Fleischer Studios, Famous Studios), (d. 1964).
- March 20: Michael Redgrave, British actor and director (narrator in A Christmas Carol), (d. 1985).
- March 31: Anton Loeb, American animator, cartoonist, and illustrator (Fleischer Studios), (d. 1984).

=== April ===
- April 13: Bob Nolan, American country singer and actor (sang in the Pecos Bill segment in Melody Time), (d. 1980).
- April 19: Robert Stokes, American animator (Harman-Ising, Ub Iwerks, Walt Disney Company, Warner Bros. Cartoons), (d. 1980).
- April 23: Myron Waldman, American animator and comics artist (worked for Fleischer Brothers and Hal Seeger), (d. 2006).

=== May ===
- May 3: Jack Zander, American animator (The Van Beuren Corporation, Terrytoons, Metro-Goldwyn-Mayer cartoon studio), (d. 2007).
- May 15: Joe Grant, American animator, character designer and screenwriter (Walt Disney Company), (d. 2005).
- May 17: Ralph Wright, American animator, storyboard writer (Walt Disney Company) and actor (voice of Eeyore in the Winnie the Pooh franchise), (d. 1983).
- May 20: James Stewart, American actor (voice of Wylie Burp in An American Tail: Fievel Goes West), (d. 1997).
- May 22: Nino Pagot, Italian comics artist and animator (Calimero), (d. 1972).
- May 25: Barbara Luddy, American actress (voice of Lady in Lady and the Tramp, Merryweather in Sleeping Beauty, Rover in One Hundred and One Dalmatians, Kanga in Winnie the Pooh), (d. 1979).
- May 26: Robert Morley, English actor (Narrator in The Dot and the Line: A Romance in Lower Mathematics, voice the Sultan in Hugo the Hippo), (d. 1992).
- May 30: Mel Blanc, American voice actor (voice of Bugs Bunny, Daffy Duck, Porky Pig, Tweety Bird, Sylvester the Cat and various other characters in the Looney Tunes franchise, Barney Rubble and Dino in The Flintstones, Mr. Spacely in The Jetsons, original voice of Woody Woodpecker), (d. 1989).

=== June ===
- June 14: John Scott Trotter, American arranger, composer and orchestra leader (Peanuts), (d. 1975).
- June 18: Bud Collyer, American actor (voice of the title character in Superman), (d. 1969).
- June 29: John Hench, American animator, designer and creative director (Walt Disney Company), (d. 2004).

=== July ===
- July 23: Karl Swenson, American actor (voice of Merlin in The Sword in the Stone), (d. 1978).
- July 25: Harold Peary, American actor and comedian (voice of the Devil in the Private Snafu cartoon Hot Spot, Herman in The Roman Holidays, Fenwick Fuddy in The Galloping Ghost, and Yogi's Space Race, Big Ben in Rudolph's Shiny New Year and Rudolph and Frosty's Christmas in July), (d. 1985).

=== August ===
- August 4: Wally Maher, American actor (original voice of Screwy Squirrel), (d. 1951).
- August 20: Alan Reed, American voice actor (voice of Fred Flintstone in The Flintstones, Dum Dum in Touche Turtle and Dum Dum, Boris the Russian Wolfhound in Lady and the Tramp), (d. 1977).
- August 24: John Reed, American animator, special effects artist, and animation director (Fantasia, Bambi, Animal Farm), (d. 1992).

=== September ===
- September 10: Raymond Scott, American composer, (d. 1994).
- September 13: Mae Questel, American actress (voice of Betty Boop and Olive Oyl), (d. 1998).
- September 15: Penny Singleton, American actress and labor leader (voice of Jane Jetson in The Jetsons), (d. 2003).
- September 26: Shug Fisher, American actor, singer, songwriter, musician, and comedian (voice of Uncle Pecos in the Tom and Jerry short "Pecos Pest"), (d. 1984).
- September 30: Wetzel Whitaker, American animator, film director, and film producer (Cinderella, Alice in Wonderland, Peter Pan), (d. 1985).

=== October ===
- October 22: José Escobar Saliente, Spanish animator, comics writer and artist, (d. 1994).
- October 24: Preston Blair, American animator (Walter Lantz, Charles Mintz, Walt Disney Company, MGM, Tex Avery, Hanna-Barbera), (d. 1995).

=== November ===
- November 12: Shamus Culhane, American animator and film producer (J.R. Bray, Fleischer Studios, Ub Iwerks, Walt Disney Company, Warner Bros. Cartoons, Walter Lantz) and film director (The Barber of Seville), (d. 1996).

=== December ===
- December 2: Cal Dalton, American film director and animator (Warner Bros. Cartoons, Walt Disney Company), (d. 1974).
- December 14: Morey Amsterdam, American actor, comedian, writer and producer (voice of narrator in Gay Purr-ee, Brady and James in Mister Magoo's Christmas Carol, One Million (O.M) in Rudolph's Shiny New Year), (d. 1996).

=== Specific date unknown ===
- Stamatis L. Polenakis, Greek comic artist and animated film director (O Ntoútse afigeítai, translated as The Duce Narrates), (d. 1997).

== Deaths ==
=== July ===
- July 2: Wilhelm Grube, German sinologist and ethnographer, (provided the German translations of a set of Chinese shadow play scripts), dies at age 52.

== Sources ==
- Barrier, Michael (1999). Hollywood cartoons : American animation in its golden age. Oxford University Press. ISBN 0-19-503759-6.
- Barrier, Michael (2003), "Warner Bros., 1933-1940", Hollywood Cartoons: American Animation in Its Golden Age, Oxford University Press, ISBN 978-0199839223
- Hardy, Phil. The Encyclopedia of Science Fiction Movies. Woodbury, Tennessee: Woodbury Press, 1984. ISBN 978-0-78940-185-4.
- Paris, Michael. From the Wright Brothers to Top Gun: Aviation, Nationalism, and Popular Cinema. Manchester, UK: Manchester University Press, 1995. ISBN 978-0-7190-4074-0.
- Sigall, Martha (2005). Living life inside the lines: Tales from the Golden age of Animation. University Press of Mississippi. ISBN 1-57806-749-9.
