= Princess Nicotine; or, The Smoke Fairy =

1909 film

- Directed by: J. Stuart Blackton
- Produced by: J. Stuart Blackton
- Starring: Paul Panzer; Gladys Hulette
- Cinematography: Tony Gaudio
- Distributed by: Vitagraph Studios
- Release date: August 10, 1909
- Running time: 5 minutes
- Country: United States

Princess Nicotine; or, The Smoke Fairy is a 1909 American silent short trick film directed by J. Stuart Blackton.

In the film, a smoker (Paul Panzer) falls asleep and is visited by two fairies (one of which is played by Gladys Hulette). Audiences marveled at the special effects featuring the fairies interacting with objects much larger than themselves.

Princess Nicotine; or, The Smoke Fairy was the first instance of tobacco product placement (for Sweet Corporal cigarettes and cigars) in the movies.

In 2003, it was among the 25 films selected for preservation in the Library of Congress National Film Registry for being "culturally, historically or aesthetically significant."

== Production ==
The film was produced and most likely directed by J. Stuart Blackton, an illustrator and one of the most important figures in early film history. Blackton specialized in "trick films" and sharpened his skill with early special effects making fake footage of the Spanish-American War and animated films. Princess Nicotine was shot by Tony Gaudio, who used mirrors to achieve a deep depth of field. The film was probably inspired by Émile Cohl's The Animated Matches (1908), which had previously featured stop-motion matches that appeared to move by themselves. Blackton and Gaudio also employed hidden wires, double exposures, giant props, and smoke to make the film appear magical and dreamlike. The film's special effects astonished audiences, and Scientific American dedicated an article to explaining how the film was made.

== Reception ==
Frederick A. Talbot, in Moving Pictures: How They Are Made and Worked, proclaims that "Princess Nicotine ranks as one of the finest trick films ever made in the United States", and explains the production's "tricks" in great detail.
