= Romeo and Juliet (1908 film) =

1908 film by J. Stuart Blackton

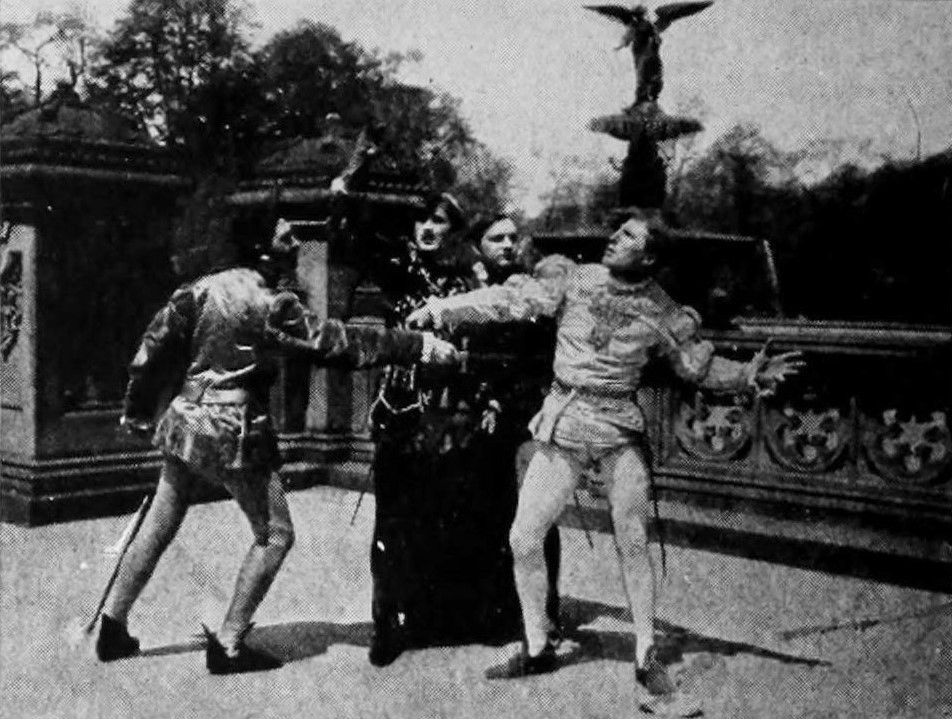
- Tybalt and Mercutio duel
- Directed by: J. Stuart Blackton
- Based on: Romeo and Juliet; 1597 play by William Shakespeare
- Produced by: J. Stuart Blackton
- Starring: Paul Panzer; Florence Lawrence
- Distributed by: Vitagraph Studios
- Release date: June 6, 1908 (United States)
- Running time: 15 minutes
- Country: United States
- Language: Silent film

Romeo and Juliet is a silent film short made in 1908 made by Vitagraph Studios. It was the first American film version of the play. Directed by J. Stuart Blackton, it was filmed at Bethesda Terrace in Manhattan, New York.

The film starred Paul Panzer as Romeo and Florence Lawrence as Juliet.

According to the Silent Era Company, a complete print of the film survives.

== Plot summary ==
The 1908 Vitagraph short condenses Shakespeare’s five‑act tragedy into a single reel. The action opens in Renaissance Verona, where the noble houses of Montague and Capulet are locked in a bitter feud.

At a masked ball hosted by the Capulets, young Romeo Montague (Paul Panzer) first catches sight of Juliet Capulet (Florence Lawrence). Although they learn afterward that they belong to rival families, their instant attraction leads Friar Laurence to secretly marry them the next day, hoping to reconcile the households.

Tybalt, Juliet’s hot‑headed cousin, challenges Romeo to a duel. When Romeo refuses, Mercutio steps in but is slain by Tybalt. Enraged, Romeo avenges his friend by killing Tybalt and subsequently flees Verona under the Friar’s counsel.

Meanwhile, Juliet’s parents arrange her marriage to Count Paris. To avoid this, she takes a potion supplied by Friar Laurence that induces a death‑like coma. The Friar’s letter explaining the scheme fails to reach Romeo, who returns to the Capulet tomb believing Juliet truly dead.

In grief, Romeo takes poison and dies beside Juliet. Awakening moments later, Juliet finds Romeo lifeless and kills herself with his dagger. The film closes with Friar Laurence discovering the lovers, lamenting their fate but not depicting the families’ reconciliation.

Most of the narrative relies on expressive pantomime and a handful of intertitles, with critical scenes—meeting at the ball, the secret wedding, Mercutio’s death—communicated through gesture and staging rather than text.

== Cast ==
- Paul Panzer - Romeo
- Florence Lawrence - Juliet
- John G. Adolfi - Tybalt
- Josephine Atkinson - Bit
- Louise Carver - Nurse
- Charles Chapman - Montague
- Gladys Hulette
- Charles Kent - Capulet
- William V. Ranous - Friar Lawrence
- William Shea - Peter
- Harry Solter
- Florence Turner
