= The Thieving Hand =

1908 film

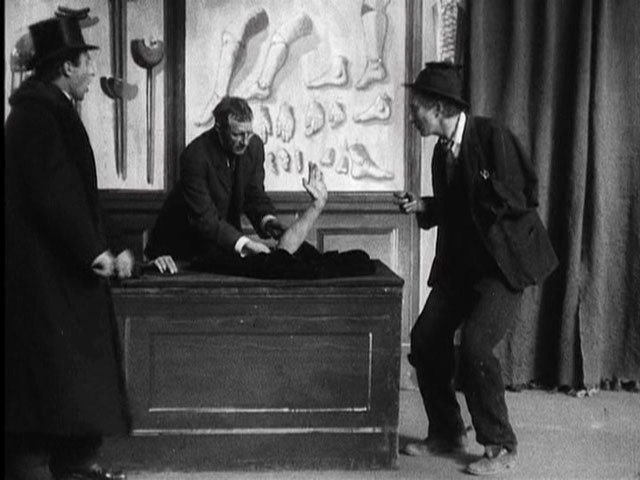
- Starring: Paul Panzer
- Distributed by: Vitagraph Studios
- Release date: February 1, 1908
- Running time: 6 minutes (16 frames per second)
- Country: United States
- Language: Silent film

Full film

The Yama Yama Man
Ada Jones & Victor Light Opera Company, 1909

The Thieving Hand (1908) is a surrealist silent short produced in the United States. As a trick film, it is known for "simple but flawless" special effects. No director is credited in the film. While some sources say it was J. Stuart Blackton, other sources say the director is unknown.

== Plot ==
A one-armed street peddler, who sells pencils from a cup, receives the gift of a new arm by a kindly stranger at a store that specializes in "Limb" replacements. The new arm has a mind of its own, though, and brings the man nothing but trouble. The peddler is arrested for thievery and thrown into jail. The story concludes with the arm crawling back to its rightful owner, a one-armed convicted thief in the same jail wearing stripped pajamas. At this point the film abruptly ends, but missing frames from the film show the pencil vendor is set free, and is free of the cursed arm.

== Film ==
The film was shot on location in Flatbush, Brooklyn, New York City and released on February 1, 1908. It was among the early films of Vitagraph Studios, and was one of Paul Panzer's early films, he remained active in film until the 1950s.

No director is credited in the film. Some sources say the director is unknown while other sources attribute it to J. Stuart Blackton. None of the sources describe how they arrived at their conclusion, nor acknowledge a difference of opinion with other sources.

It is anthologized in the DVD set Treasures from American Film Archives (2000), compiled by the National Film Preservation Foundation. It is a digital reproduction from a 35mm print owned by George Eastman House, which has the only known surviving copy. In this release, the film's music score is an uncredited modern rendition of the comic ragtime song "The Yama Yama Man", from the play The Three Twins, a hit on Broadway in 1908.

The final frames in the final scene are missing in the sole known surviving copy of the film. They show the pencil vendor set free from jail after all becomes clear he was the innocent victim of the arm's true owner.

It was reviewed in Moving Picture World, which oddly criticized the surreal film for its lack of realism, noting that criminal suspects are not housed with convicts until after they are convicted. However the reviewer concludes it is "a fine trick film, full of ingenuity and good quality".

== Influences ==
According to Ryan Sweet, the plot has similarities to earlier stories that may have influenced the makers of the film. The street ballad "The Thief's Arm", collected by John Ashton in 1888, tells the story of an amputee who is fitted with a new arm that has an agency of its own, like in the film it steals without the owner's direction. Another possible influence according to Sweet was the popular song "The Steam Arm" from c. 1835, about an amputee fitted with a steam-powered limb that he can't control and that goes on a death and destruction rampage.
