= The Airship, or 100 Years Hence =

- Screenshot
- Directed by: J. Stuart Blackton
- Written by: J. Stuart Blackton
- Screenplay by: J. Stuart Blackton
- Story by: J. Stuart Blackton
- Produced by: J. Stuart Blackton
- Starring: J. Stuart Blackton; Florence Lawrence
- Cinematography: J. Stuart Blackton
- Edited by: J. Stuart Blackton
- Production company: The Vitagraph Company of America
- Distributed by: The Vitagraph Company of America
- Release date: April 25, 1908
- Running time: 137 metres (split reel): 4:59 minutes
- Country: United States
- Language: Silent

The Airship, or 100 Years Hence is an American adventure comedy-drama silent short film written, produced and directed by J. Stuart Blackton. The film stars Blackton and Florence Lawrence. It was released on April 25, 1908 by The American Vitagraph Company; a partial print of The Airship, or 100 Years Hence is preserved in the Paper Print Collection (Library of Congress). The Airship, or 100 Years Hence advertised that it would be "a forecast of a probable means of air navigation in the coming century."

== Plot ==
A young lady and a friend are observed entering an airship, which is loaded with ballast, sand bags, vegetables, and more. They laugh heartily, shake hands and are off. Another individual equipped with wings, in the clouds. Below, a Jewish man walking down the street, has some sawdust fall on him, then some vegetables. All the items are falling from the airship.

Other pedestrians including a policeman, stop and look upward, and are showered with vegetables. An air-cycle cop is summoned, who mounts his machine and flies upward.

The Jewish man reaches his pawn shop where a man comes in to pawn a pair of wings. The broker gives the loan, tries on his strange equipment, and soars up into the sky. In a collision, the air-cycle cop causing the broker to fall through space, lighting on the moon for a moment, then into the ocean. At the sea bottom, the broker flirts with mermaids, but a whale suddenly swallows him up.

On a passing ship, sailors are fishing and catch the whale, cutting it open to find the hapless broker. (Note: Blackton's plot involved elements of antisemitism, typical of the era.)

== Cast ==
- Florence Lawrence as Airship passenger
- J. Stuart Blackton (Note: During the period of work at the Vitagraph studio, J. Stuart Blackton ran the studio, as well as being involved in producing, directing, and writing its films. He even starred in some of his films, although it is unclear whether he is in The Airship, or 100 Years Hence.)

== Production ==
Blackton was one of the first filmmakers to use the techniques of stop-motion and drawn animation, and is considered a father of American animation. The Airship, or 100 Years Hence was produced by the Vitagraph Company of America.

== Reception ==
In projections, The Airship, or 100 Years Hence was programmed with the split reel system, merged into a single reel with another short film produced by Vitagraph, True Hearts Are More Than Coronets.Phil Hardy in The Encyclopedia of Science Fiction Movies (1984) noted that "the film was never intended to be taken seriously."

Aviation historian Michael Paris wrote, The Airship, or 100 Years Hence "... combined novelty and comedy."
