= The Bootleggers =

1922 film

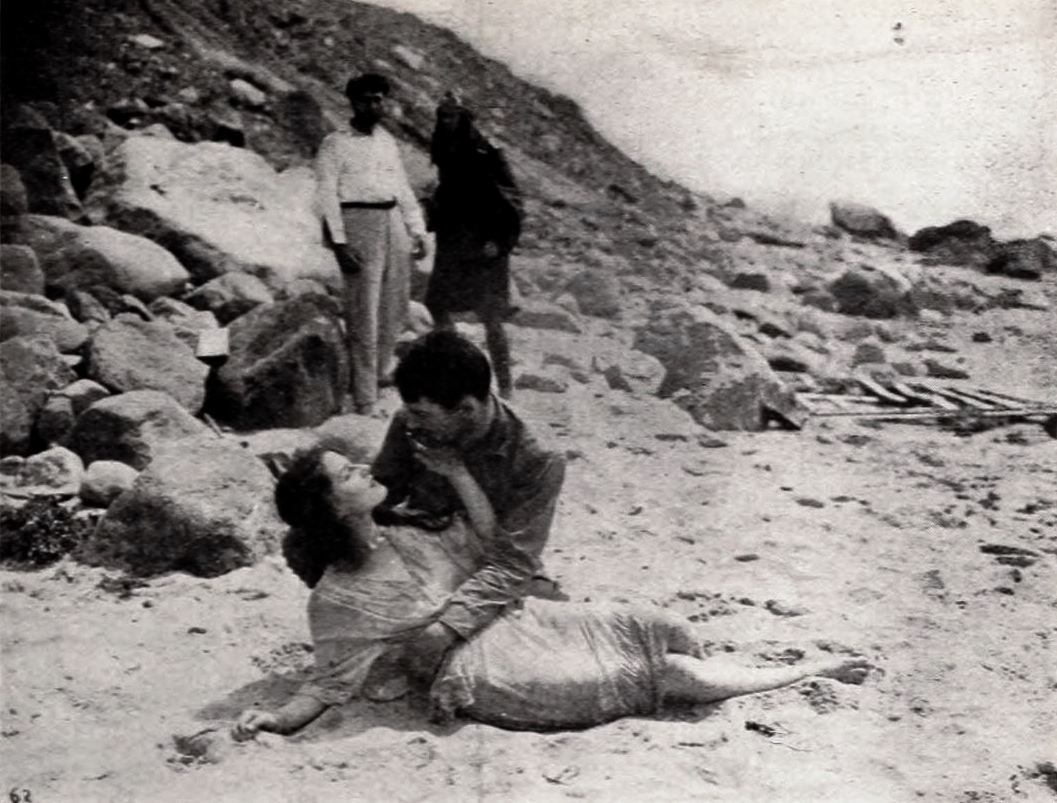
- Film still
- Directed by: Roy Sheldon
- Written by: Thomas F. Fallon
- Story by: Thomas F. Fallon
- Cinematography: Anthony G. Trigili
- Production company: Al Gilbert Film Productions
- Distributed by: Film Booking Offices of America
- Release date: April 1922
- Country: United States
- Language: Silent (English intertitles)

The Bootleggers is a 1922 American silent drama film directed by Roy Sheldon and starring Walter Miller, Paul Panzer, and Jules Cowles. It is likely a lost film.

== Cast ==
- Walter Miller as Jack Seville
- Paul Panzer as Jose Fernand
- Jules Cowles as The Hermit
- Hazel Flint as Olive Wood
- Norma Shearer as Helen Barnes
- Jane Allen as Alice Barnes
- Lucia Backus Seger as Mrs. Murphy

== Bibliography ==
- Jack Jacobs & Myron Braum. The films of Norma Shearer. A. S. Barnes, 1976.
