= The Woman the Germans Shot =

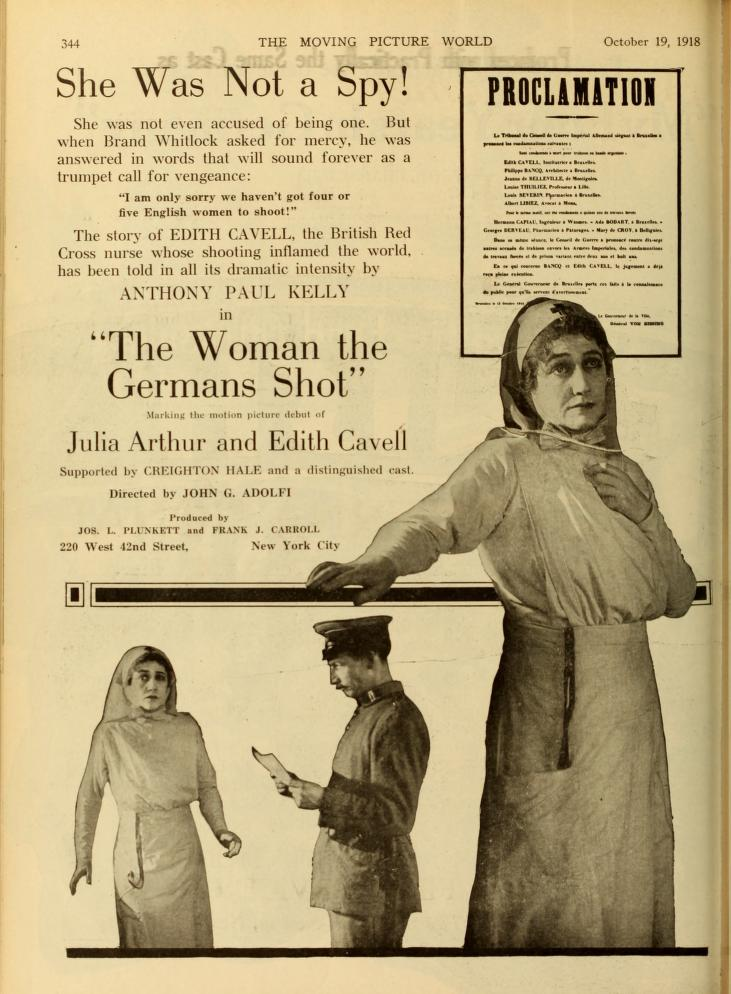
- Contemporary advertisement
- Directed by: John G. Adolfi
- Written by: Anthony Paul Kelly
- Produced by: Joseph L. Plunkett; Frank J. Carroll
- Starring: Julia Arthur
- Cinematography: Max Schneider (aka M. Snyder)
- Distributed by: Selznick Pictures / Select Pictures
- Release date: October 27, 1918
- Running time: 6 reels
- Country: United States
- Language: Silent (English intertitles)

The Woman the Germans Shot, also known as The Cavell Case, is a 1918 American silent war biographical film based on the life and career of Nurse Edith Cavell. It was directed by John G. Adolfi and starred stage star Julia Arthur in her screen debut. It was released the month before World War I ended.

== Plot ==
As described in a film magazine, Edith Cavell (Arthur) is beloved by George Brooks (Brooks), but decides to follow the dictates of her conscious and nurse the sick and suffering. George goes to war. Years later they meet again, he now a blinded middle-aged man with a fine young son Frank (Hale) who is in love with a beautiful girl. For old times sake Edith becomes George's nurse when a delicate operation is performed that restores his sight. World War I breaks out and she returns to Belgium where she teaches other nurses. After the Germans take possession of the hospital and throw the British soldiers in the foul cellar, Edith often slips down there to dress their wounds. She is discovered and abused by the Germans. They have her watched, but in spite of them finds young Frank Brooks there and helps him escape, sending her message for all England to fight. She is arrested, tried, and, despite the efforts of civilized nations to save her, executed. Her shooting helps raise an army that will fight to prevent similar atrocities.

== Cast ==
- Julia Arthur as Nurse Edith Cavell
- Creighton Hale as Frank Brooks
- Thomas Brooks as George Brooks
- George Le Guere as George Brooks, as a young man
- William H. Tooker as General von Blissing
- J. W. Johnston as U.S. Minister to Belgium
- Paul Panzer as Baron von der Lancker
- Joyce Fair as Joan Clemons
- George Majeroni as Spanish Minister to Belgium
- Sara Alexander as Mrs. Clavell
- Amy Dennis as Edith Cavell as a young woman
- Fred Melville as U.S. Ambassador to Great Britain
- Martin Faust as Secretary to American Legation at Brussels
- George Dupree as A Belgian Lawyer
- Fred Kalgren as Captain von Baring
- Louis Sturz as M. Kirschen

== See also ==
- The Martyrdom of Nurse Cavell (1916)
- Nurse Cavell (1916)
- Dawn (1928)
- Nurse Edith Cavell (1939)

== Preservation ==
With no prints of The Woman the Germans Shot located in any film archives, it is a lost film.
