= The Life of Moses =

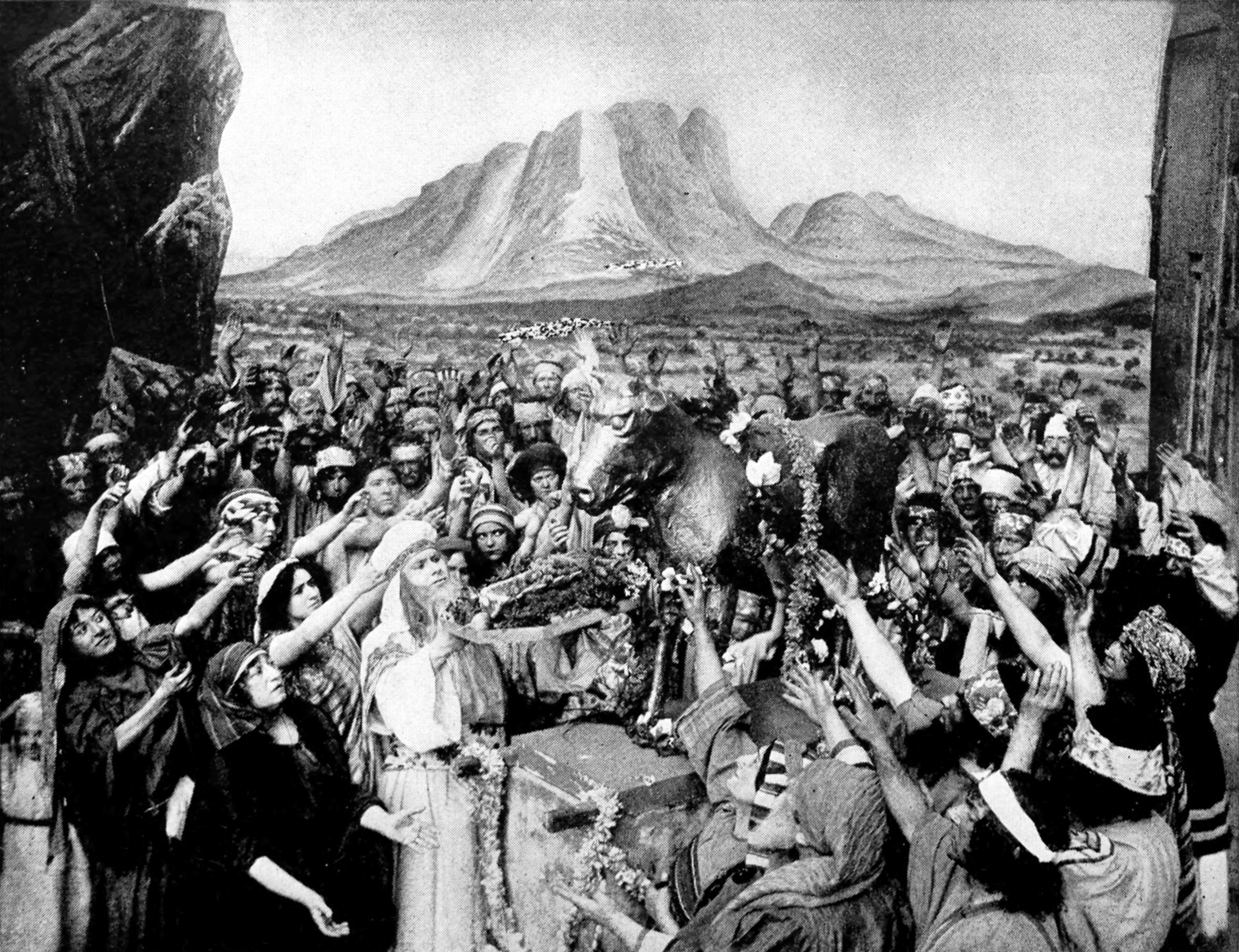
- Directed by: J. Stuart Blackton
- Produced by: Madison L. Peters
- Starring: Pat Hartigan; Julia Arthur; William J. Humphrey
- Production company: Vitagraph Company of America
- Distributed by: Vitagraph Company of America
- Release date: December 4, 1909
- Running time: 50 minutes (5 reels)
- Country: United States
- Languages: Silent; English intertitles

The Life of Moses is a 1909 American silent epic film directed by J. Stuart Blackton and starring Pat Hartigan, Julia Arthur and William J. Humphrey. A portrayal of the biblical story of Moses, it was one of a number of prestige film based on historical or religious subjects made during the era.

It was produced by the Vitagraph Company, a leading early film studio. Relating five different events in Moses' life, it lasted five reels. It met great resistance from movie theater owners, who preferred shorter films that allowed them to change their audience much faster. Although often shown in five separate parts, the successful screening of the entire film in single sittings was influential in the gradual move away from short one or two reel films towards feature film production.

== Cast ==
- Pat Hartigan as Moses
- Julia Arthur
- William J. Humphrey
- Charles Kent
- Edith Storey

== Preservation status ==
The film is preserved in the Library of Congress collection.

== Bibliography ==
- Dewey, Donald. Buccaneer: James Stuart Blackton and the Birth of American Movies. Rowman & Littlefield, 2016.
