= Paula Blackton =

American actress and film director

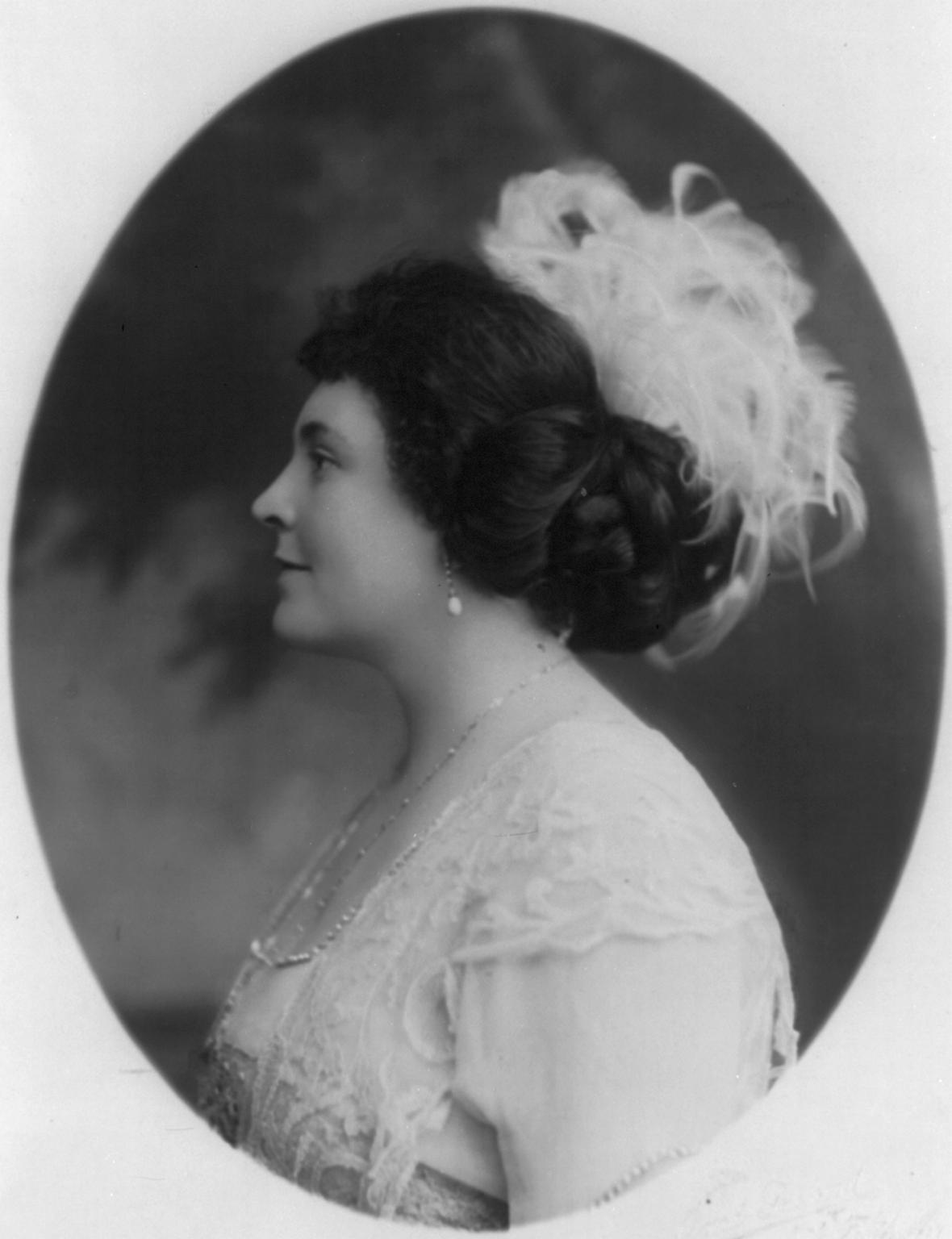
- Paula Blackton, c. 1912
- Born: Paula Hilburn; August 1, 1881; Atlanta, Georgia, United States
- Died: March 27, 1930 (aged 48); Los Angeles, California, U.S.
- Occupation(s): Actress, director

Paula Blackton (née Hilburn; known professionally as Paula Dean; August 1, 1881 – March 27, 1930) was a silent-screen actress and film director.

== Filmography ==
- The Littlest Scout (1919)
- The Diary of a Puppy (1917)
- The Fairy Godfather (1917)
- Satin and Calico (1917)
- A Spring Idyl (1917)
- The Collie Market (1917)
- The Little Strategist (1917)

=== Director ===
- The Littlest Scout (1919)

=== Writer ===
- The Littlest Scout (1919)

== Family ==
In 1906, the Georgia-born Paula Hilburn married director and producer J. Stuart Blackton. They had two children, Violet Virginia Blackton (Mrs Woolrich; 1910–1965) and Charles Stuart Blackton (1914–2007), both of whom became film actors, and featured in their mother's productions.

== Death ==
Paula Blackton died of cancer in 1930 at the age of 48. She is buried at Hollywood Forever Cemetery.
