= Humorous Phases of Funny Faces =

1906 film by J. Stuart Blackton

- Directed by: J. Stuart Blackton
- Produced by: J. Stuart Blackton
- Starring: J. Stuart Blackton
- Distributed by: Vitagraph Company of America
- Release date: April 6, 1906
- Running time: 3 minutes
- Country: United States
- Language: silent

Humorous Phases of Funny Faces is a 1906 short silent animated film directed by James Stuart Blackton and generally regarded by film historians as the first animated film recorded on standard picture film.

== Content ==
In the cartoon, animated hand-drawn scenes appear on a chalkboard, including a clown playing with a hat and a dog jumping through a hoop. In the beginning, though, the cartoonist's hands are included, too, as he draws the first several lines on the chalkboard in standard live action. From there, the stop-motion technique is used to show what appears to be drawings completing—and then moving—by themselves with no artist on screen.

== Techniques ==
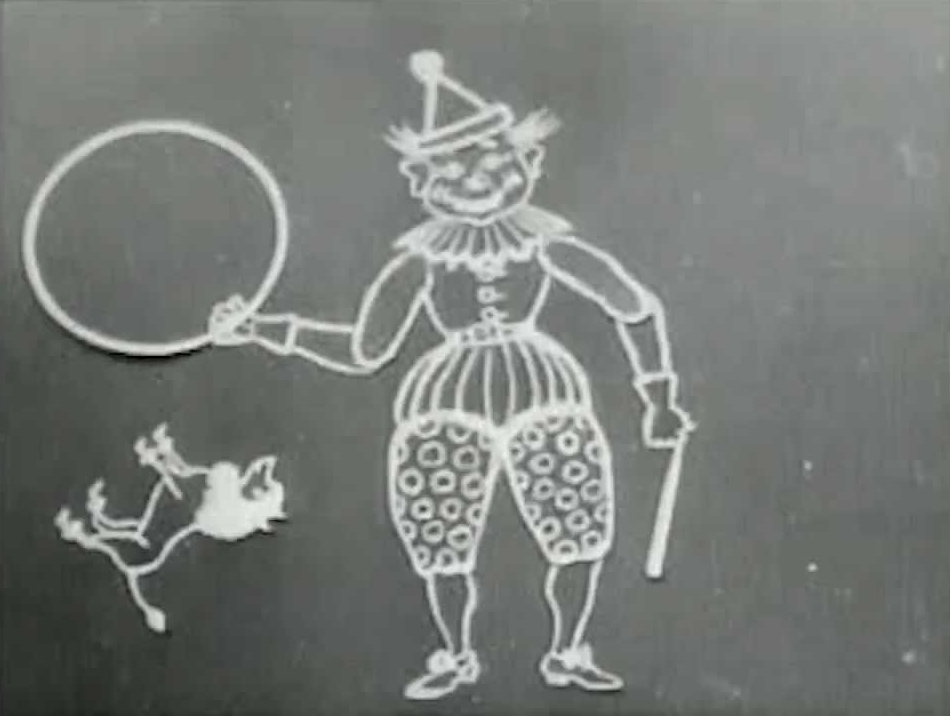
A single frame from the animation, showing the use of cut-out technique

Stop-motion as well as cutout animation are used, just as Edwin Porter moved his letters in How Jones Lost His Roll, and The Whole Dam Family and the Dam Dog. However, there is a very short section of the film where things are made to appear to move by altering the drawings themselves from frame to frame.

The film moves at 20 frames per second.

== See also ==
- Fantasmagorie
- The Enchanted Drawing
- History of animation
