= The Enchanted Drawing =

1900 film directed by J. Stuart Blackton

- The entire film
- Produced by: Vitagraph Studios; Thomas Edison
- Starring: J. Stuart Blackton
- Distributed by: Edison Studios
- Release date: November 16, 1900
- Running time: 1:30
- Country: United States
- Languages: Silent film English intertitles

The Enchanted Drawing is a 1900 silent trick film directed by J. Stuart Blackton. It is best known for containing the first animated sequences recorded on standard picture film, which has led Blackton to be considered the father of American animation. This film was produced by Edison Manufacturing Company and shot in Vitagraph's rooftop studio in Brooklyn, New York.

== Contents ==
The film shows a man drawing a cartoon face on an easel. He draws a bottle of wine and a glass, then takes them off the paper and has a drink. He then gives the cartoon face a drink of wine, and the face breaks into a broad smile. He then draws a hat on the face's head, removes it, and puts it on. Next a cigar appears in the face's mouth, and the man removes it to the face's unhappiness. He then places all of the objects back into the image, and the face's eyes and grin grow wider in appreciation. Blackton continued the playful illusion. Blackton draws a top hat and a cigar on the paper, lifts them, and watches the drawn figure react with emotion, displeasure when they are briefly removed and delighted when they return. These transformations highlight the magician type quality of Blackton's performance, combining drawing and live action in an early cinematic demonstration of this visual trickery. The Enchanted Drawing is not a fully animated film but, it does heavily rely on stop camera substitution, the camera stops, things are changed and or replaced, and then the film is resumed to create this illusion that drawn objects came alive.

== Technique ==
It is a combination of a silent film and stop motion animation. The Enchanted Drawing used a combination of live action performance and stop camera substitution which is a variation of the "stop trick" to create the illusion that drawn objects can become real. When Blackton drew items like a bottle, a goblet, a hat, a cigar he stops filming, physically replaces or supplements the drawn object, and then resumes filming the animation to give the impression that these items magically emerge from the drawing This approach shows how Blackton's vaudeville background as a lighting sketch artist, in which he would draw very quickly in front of a live audience and created visual surprise. He really adapted that performance style for film by putting together his sped-up drawing act with a cinematic spin. While this film isn't a frame-by-frame type of animation in the modern sense of things, this technique is historically important because it anticipates true animation at its finest. According to the Library of Congress, The Enchanted Drawing is considered a "proto animation" film. Although that drawn face does not move through the traditional cel animation, Blackton's substitution splices make the drawing respond to real world interactions The films method also uses very subtle changes in the drawn figure's expression. After these objects are removed or put back, the drawn face exhibits different emotions, but these changes are made not by redrawing entire frames, but by using stop camera swaps to slightly change the drawing between takes. The technique helped pave the way for Blackton's later projects, such as Humorous Phases of Funny Faces (1906), in which he used stop motion and cutout animation to bring chalk drawings fully to life

== See also ==
- List of American films of 1900
