= Donald's Camera =

1941 Donald Duck cartoon

- Theatrical release poster
- Directed by: Dick Lundy
- Produced by: Walt Disney
- Starring: Clarence Nash
- Color process: Technicolor
- Production company: Walt Disney Productions
- Distributed by: RKO Radio Pictures
- Release date: October 24, 1941
- Running time: 7 minutes
- Country: United States
- Language: English

Donald's Camera is a 1941 American Donald Duck short film directed by Dick Lundy and produced by Walt Disney.

== Plot ==
Donald decides to bring his camera to "hunt" some wildlife. He encounters several, including a woodpecker, who quickly torment him and make his efforts to photograph them difficult.

== Voice cast ==
- Clarence Nash as Donald Duck

== Home media ==
The short was released on May 18, 2004, on Walt Disney Treasures: The Chronological Donald, Volume One: 1934-1941.
