= Paul Panzer =

German actor (1872–1958)

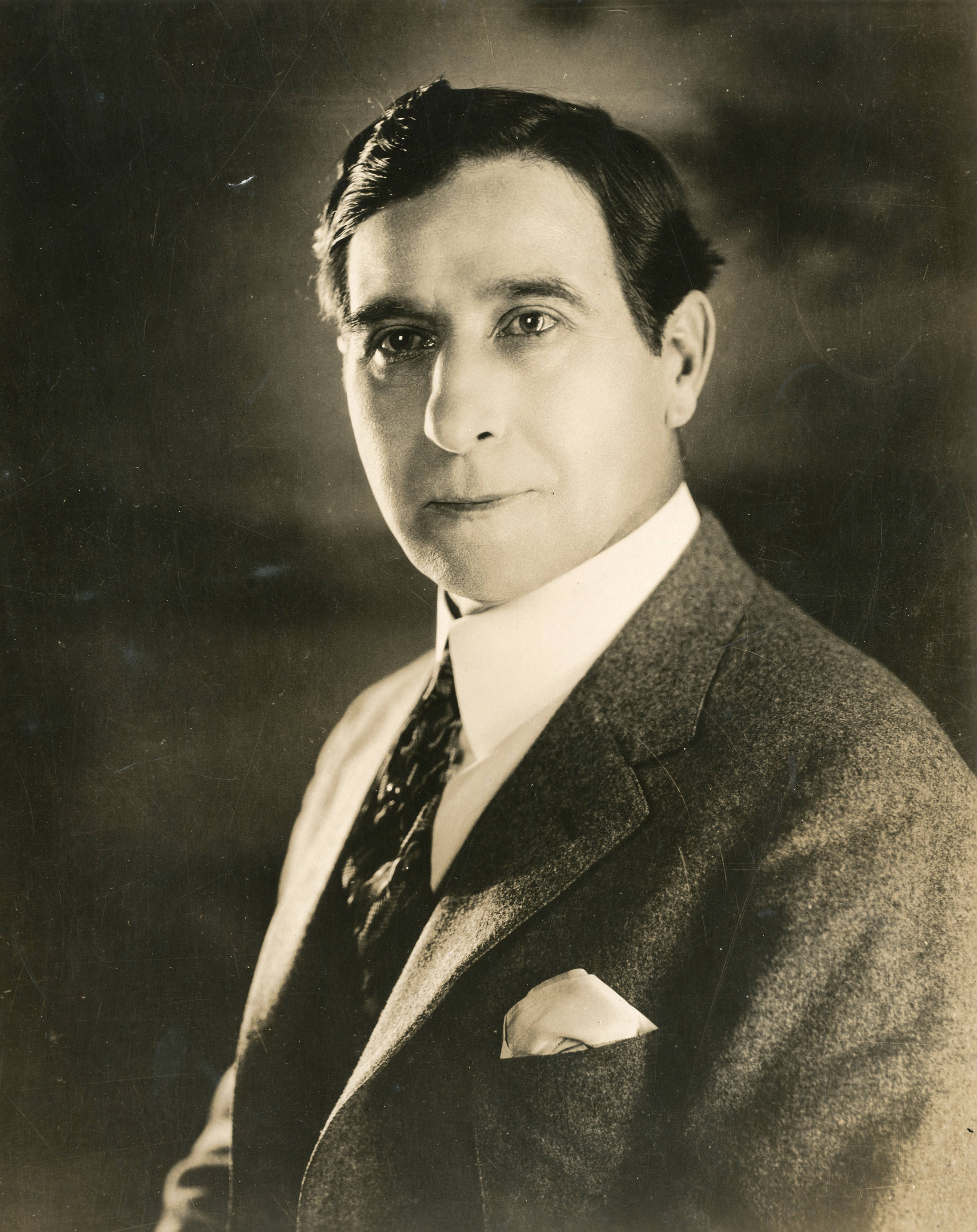
- Panzer in 1926
- Born: Paul Wolfgang Panzerbeiter; November 3, 1872; Würzburg, Bavaria, Germany
- Died: August 16, 1958 (aged 85); Hollywood, California, U.S.
- Occupation: Actor
- Years active: 1905–1952
- Spouse: Josephine Panzer (?–1954; her death)
- Children: 2

Paul Wolfgang Panzerbeiter (November 3, 1872 – August 16, 1958), known professionally as Paul Panzer, was a German-American silent film actor. He appeared in more than 330 films between 1905 and 1952.

== Biography ==
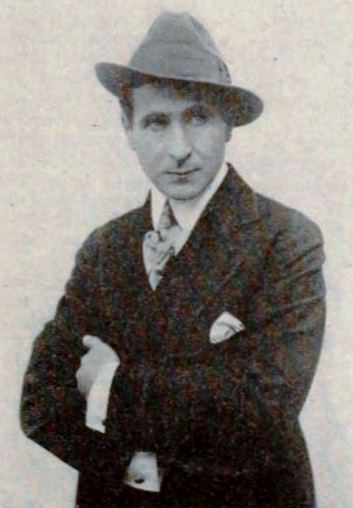
Panzer in 1920

Panzer was born in Würzburg, Bavaria. His education included studying pharmacy at the University of Würzburg and studying vocal music at the Conservatory of Würzburg. He was a lieutenant in Germany's artillery reserves when he left there.

Panzer's early work building sets and painting scenes for a New York City film studio developed his interest in the film industry. He also was involved with live theater, working for Augustin Daly both on stage and as stage manager.

Panzer was best known for playing Koerner / Raymond Owen in The Perils of Pauline. From 1934 through the 1950s he was under contract to Warner Brothers as an extra.

== Personal life ==
Panzer and his wife, Josephine, had a son and a daughter. After he retired from acting, Panzer lived with his daughter in Culver City, California. He died on August 16, 1958, in Hollywood, California, and was buried in Forest Lawn Cemetery in Hollywood Hills.

== Selected filmography ==
- The Thieving Hand (1908, Short) – Man Buying Artificial Limb (uncredited)
- Macbeth (1908, Short) – Macduff
- Romeo and Juliet (1908, Short) – Romeo
- Princess Nicotine; or, The Smoke Fairy (1909, Short) – The Smoker
- The Perils of Pauline (1914, Serial) – Raymond Owen – aka Koerner (re-release)
- The Last Volunteer (1914) – Ambassador of Austrania
- The Exploits of Elaine (1914) – Minor Role
- The Woman Who Lied (1915, Short)
- Under Southern Skies (1915) – Steve Daubeney
- The Spender (1915) – Jim Walsh
- Autumn (1916) – Diamond Jack
- Elusive Isabel (1916) – Coount Rosini
- Broken Fetters (1916) – Carleton Demarest
- The House of Hate (1918)
- The Unchastened Woman (1918)
- The Woman the Germans Shot (1918)
- The Masked Rider (1919)
- Who's Your Brother? (1919)
- The Mystery Mind (1920)
- The Bootleggers (1922)
- The Mohican's Daughter (1922)
- Mighty Lak' a Rose (1923)
- Enemies of Women (1923)
- Jacqueline (1923)
- Unseeing Eyes (1923)
- A Son of the Sahara (1924)
- Wages of Virtue (1924)
- The Mad Marriage (1925)
- The Shock Punch (1925)
- Greater Than a Crown (1925)
- The Fool (1925)
- The Ancient Mariner (1925)
- Thunder Mountain (1925)
- The Best Bad Man (1925)
- Black Paradise (1926)
- The High Flyer (1926)
- The Johnstown Flood (1926)
- Siberia (1926)
- The Dixie Merchant (1926)
- Hawk of the Hills (1927)
- Sally in Our Alley (1927)
- The Girl from Chicago (1927)
- Rinty of the Desert (1928)
- George Washington Cohen (1928)
- The Candy Kid (1928)
- The City of Purple Dreams (1928)
- Glorious Betsy (1928)
- The Black Book (1929)
- Dishonored (1931)
- Sea Devils (1931)
- Defenders of the Law (1931)
- Police Court (1932)
- The Kid from Spain (1932)
- The Song of Songs (1933)
- Times Square Playboy (1936)
- Bengal Tiger (1936)
- Highway West (1941)
- Casablanca (1942) – Rick's Waiter (uncredited)
- The Perils of Pauline (1947)
