= Francisco Reséndez =

Mexican voice actor (1941–2026)

- Born: Francisco Reséndez Novoa; 10 July 1941; Mexico City, Mexico
- Died: 2 September 2026 (aged 85)
- Occupation: Voice actor

Francisco Reséndez Novoa (10 July 1941 – 2 September 2026), nicknamed "Don Paco", was a Mexican voice actor. He was best known for providing the dubbed voice of the title character, in the Spanish version of the Scooby-Doo films and television programs.

In addition to his work in Scooby-Doo, he provided the dubbed Spanish versions of Dot Pixis in Attack on Titan, Ord in Dragon Tales, Tonbei in Naruto, Tony "Duke" Evers in Rocky III, Makarov Dreyar in Fairy Tail and was the narrator in the first season of the anime television series Pokémon. Aside from acting, he was a dubbing director for the Fox animated sitcom television series The Simpsons.

Reséndez died on 2 September 2026, at the age of 85.
