= Stamatis Polenakis =

Greek cartoonist

- Born: 1908; Athens, Greece
- Died: 19 April 1997 (aged 88–89)
- Occupations: Cartoonist, painter
- Notable work: Il Duce Narrates

Stamatis Polenakis (Greek: Σταμάτης Πολενάκης; 1908 – 19 April 1997) was a 20th-century Greek artist. Although best known as a cartoonist, he was also a painter and moreover the creator of the first Greek animated film Il Duce Narrates (1945).

== Biography ==
Polenakis was born in Athens, Greece, in 1908 into a family that originated from Sifnos. He studied at the Athens School of Fine Arts, and his first illustrations were published in newspapers and magazines by the time he was still undergraduate. During the late 1930s he was already considered a notable cartoonist, and the same period he also worked as a graphic designer.

During the Axis Occupation of Greece, Polenakis fled to his home island, Sifnos, where he secretly started sketching cartoons about the Greco–Italian War mocking Benito Mussolini and the Italian forces. After the Liberation of greece and his return to Athens, those sketches were used to create the first ever Greek animated film which was released in 1945 under the title Il Duce Narrates.

The following decades, Polenakis worked for several Greek newspapers and magazines, including Romantso, Apogevmatini, and Trust tou Geliou. His best known fictional characters were Spagorammenos and Pipis Papias. After 1970, he opted for painting, and presented his artworks at numerous solo and group exhibitions. In 1979, another part of Polenakis' work from his Sifnos period (42 sketches) was donated by the artist himself to the Athens War Museum, and published in 1981.

Polenakis died on 19 April 1997. He was the father of theatre critic Leandros Polenakis and writer Maria Polenaki. His grandson is the poet Stamatis Polenakis.
