= American animation =

Animation in the United States

American animation is any animation created in the United States or by American animators. It has been used as a visual art form for expression, entertainment, news, etc. for over 100 years. The first documented American animation was in 1906 when Vitagraph released Humorous Phases of Funny Faces and has expanded as technology has progressed. Everything from 2-D animation, to modern CGI (Computer-generated imagery) has been represented in American media throughout the years.

== History ==
=== Animation in the United States during the silent era (1900s–1920s) ===
The silent age of American animation dates back to approximately 1906 when Vitagraph released Humorous Phases of Funny Faces. Director James Stuart Blackton, widely regarded as the father of American animation, developed stop-motion and cutout animation. From there, animation rapidly became more sophisticated. Although early animations were rudimentary, they rapidly became more sophisticated with such classics as Gertie the Dinosaur in 1914, in which animation pioneer Winsor McCay first employed new techniques such as keyframes, registration marks, the Mutoscope action viewer, and animation loops. While McCay continued to animate by hand, pioneers such as Earl Hurd and Paul Terry developed techniques like cel animation. Other classics of the time included Koko the Clown (1918), Felix the Cat (1919) and Oswald the Lucky Rabbit (1927).

Originally a novelty, some early animated silents depicted magic acts or were strongly influenced by the comic strip. Animation also drew significant inspiration from vaudeville, a theatrical genre that developed out of blackface minstrelsy and peaked in popularity in the 1920s. This underlying influence can be seen in several popular early animated works, which feature ethnic and racial caricatures and stereotypes. Early works were eventually distributed along with newsreels. Silent animated films, like their live-action silent cousins, would come with a musical score to be played by an organist or even an orchestra in larger theatres. Silent cartoons became almost entirely obsolete after 1928, when sound synchronized cartoons were introduced with the debut of Walt Disney's Mickey Mouse in Steamboat Willie, thus ushering in the golden age of American animation.

=== Golden age of American animation (1920s–1960s) ===
The golden age of American animation was a period that began with the popularization of sound synchronized cartoons in 1928. Much of the rapid improvement of animation took place at Walt Disney Studios. Out of this innovation, a tension emerged between the labor of the process and the magic of immersion into the result. Some cartoons emphasized and celebrated the work of animators that went into their creation, while others downplayed it. Paramount Pictures and Fleischer Studios animated cartoon characters including Betty Boop (1930) and Popeye (1933). In 1937, Disney's the first full-length animated feature film Snow White and the Seven Dwarfs and in 1939, Paramount and Fleischer's the first full-length animated feature film Gulliver's Travels. The golden age of American animation gradually ended in the early 1960s when theatrical animated cartoon film shorts started to lose popularity to the newer medium of television. Animated works from after the golden age, especially on television, were produced on cheaper budgets and with more limited techniques between the late 1950s and the mid-1980s.

=== World War II and American animation (1940s) ===
World War II changed the possibilities for animation. Prior to the war, animation was mostly seen as a form of family entertainment. The attack on Pearl Harbor was a turning point in its utility. On December 8, 1941, the Disney Studio lot in Burbank was requisitioned as an Army anti-aircraft base, occupying the space for the next eight months. Soon after, Walt Disney Productions was contracted by the United States military to produce propaganda and training films centred on ideological, cultural and instructional messages to both soldiers and the general public.

By 1942, approximately 93% of the studio's production output was devoted to government-related projects. These government projects included educational training films produced specifically for the United States Army and Navy. These included instructional pieces such as Stop That Tank! a 22-minute edutainment film that uses limited animation to teach Canadian soldiers how to use the Boys Mk.1 anti-tank rifle against Nazi tanks.

Throughout the war, Disney produced over 400,000 feet of educational war films, totalling 68 hours of continuous film, with 204,000 feet produced in 1943 alone. Within these were films intended for the public, built on morale rather than on education. Propaganda films produced during World War II generally served two primary purposes: to depict American soldiers overcoming enemy forces through comedic adventures, and to present critical portrayals of Axis powers, particularly Nazi Germany, and its political system. Commando Duck is an example of the former, featuring Donald Duck as a clumsy, emotional U.S. soldier navigating enemy-held territory in Japan and ultimately defeating the enemy on his own. An example of the latter is Education for Death: The Making of the Nazi, which follows a German boy named Hans as he is raised under the Nazi regime and subjected to ideological indoctrination, culminating in his transformation into a soldier loyal to Adolf Hitler. These films allowed Americans to release their anger and frustration through ridicule and crude humor.

=== Animation in the United States in the television era (1950s–1980s) ===
The television era of American animation was a period in the history of American animation that gradually started in the late 1950s with the decline of theatrical animated shorts and popularization of television animation, reached its peak during the 1970s, and ended around the mid-1980s. This era was characterized by low budgets, limited animation, an emphasis on television over the theater, and the general perception of cartoons being primarily for children.

As animation transitioned from theaters to television, studios needed to adapt to new economic limitations and production conditions. The closure of several major theatrical animation units during the late 1950s contributed to this shift, encouraging the development of more cost effective production methods. One of the most notable changes was the increase of the "limited animation” style, wherein the number of drawings and movements used in each scene were reduced. This approach featured simple character design, repeated motions, and greater dependence on dialogue and voice acting rather than detailed movements.

The early-to-mid 20th century saw the success of Disney's theatrical animated movies, along with Warner Bros.' Looney Tunes and MGM's Tom and Jerry cartoons. However, the state of animation began changing with the mid-century proliferation of television. By the 1970s and 1980s, studios had generally stopped producing the big-budget theatrical short animated cartoons that thrived in the golden age, but new television animation studios would thrive based on the economy and volume of their output. Studios such as Hanna-Barbera played a key role, producing large volumes of content designed specifically for broadcast television. Their productions helped to define the visual and narrative style of the era.

Many popular and famous animated cartoon characters emerged from this period, including Hanna-Barbera's The Flintstones, The Jetsons, Scooby-Doo, Yogi Bear, Wacky Races, Josie and the Pussycats, Captain Caveman, and Hong Kong Phooey, Filmation's He-Man and She-Ra, DiC Entertainment's Inspector Gadget, and Marvel Productions' and Sunbow Productions' The Transformers. The shift to television also changed how audiences engaged with animation, as cartoons became part of regular broadcast programming instead of special theatrical events. This subsequently reinforced their association with children' entertainment.

The period came to an end in the late 1980s as many entertainment companies revived their animation franchises and returned to making high-budget, successful works. Due to the perceived cheap production values, poor animation, and mixed critical and commercial reception, this period is sometimes referred to as the bronze age or dark age of American animation by critics and animation historians. Despite this, the era is fondly remembered by members of Generation X who grew up with Saturday-morning cartoons in the 1970s and 1980s.

=== Modern animation in the United States (1980s–present) ===
From the late 1980s to the early 2000s, Modern animation in the United States underwent a cultural renaissance known as the Renaissance Age. Throughout this period, many major animation studios such as Pixar, Disney, and DreamWorks produced a series of critically acclaimed films driven by the emergence of computer-generated imagery (CGI). Films such as Toy Story, A Bug's Life, Monsters, Inc., Finding Nemo, The Incredibles, Shrek, and Cars redefined animation, creating a clear departure from the previous Dark Age of American animation.

Animation companies originating from the Golden Age of American animation experienced newfound critical and commercial success. During the Disney Renaissance, The Walt Disney Company went back to producing critically and commercially successful animated films based on well-known stories, just as principal co-founder Walt Disney had done during his lifetime. Disney also began producing successful animated television shows, a then-first for the company, which led to the creation and launch of Disney Channel. Warner Bros. produced highly successful animated cartoon television series inspired by their classic Looney Tunes cartoons, while also launching the DC Animated Universe. Hanna-Barbera ceased production on low budget television series and, through its acquisition by Ted Turner, launched Cartoon Network. Nickelodeon, a network owned by the first and second incarnations of Viacom Inc. until 2019, ViacomCBS until 2022, Paramount Global until 2025, and Paramount Skydance thereafter, rose to fame by creating the Nicktoons brand in 1991 which led to various acclaimed programs under the label in the 1990s and 2000s.

In addition to television series, several animation studios also rose to prominence during this period. Pixar, for example, produced six critically acclaimed CGI films spanning from 1995 to 2005, garnering the company widespread recognition. Spanning two decades, Toy Story, A Bug's Life, Monsters, Inc., Finding Nemo, The Incredibles, and Cars, grossed over $3.2 billion globally. This commercial success propelled Pixar into the mainstream and ultimately played a significant role in driving renegotiations of its contract with Disney.

Since 1991, both Pixar and Disney operated under a five-film co-production and distribution agreement in which Pixar produced the films, and Disney handled distribution. As a result, Disney earned up to 50% of profits from Pixar's films. However, as Pixar's newfound success grew through its in-house software tools and CGI films, the company sought to renegotiate its deal with Disney.

In the early 2000s, approximately 70% of Disney's animation revenue came from Pixar-distributed films, while Disney's own CGI productions paled in comparison at the box office. As a result, in an effort to maintain its monopoly over the animation industry, Disney sought to purchase Pixar. In doing so, Disney not only prevented Pixar from partnering with competitors like Warner Bros or Fox, but also ensured the continuation of their partnership.

As a result, following the closure of the agreement between Disney and Pixar in 2005, Disney acquired Pixar for $7.4 billion on January 24, 2006. As part of the acquisition, multiple measures were implemented to protect Pixar's unique identity. For instance, Pixar retained its core leadership, maintained autonomy in film production, continued to operate under its own name, and Steve Jobs (the CEO and chairman of Pixar at the time) became a major individual shareholder in Disney.

Pixar and Disney's relationship was not the only major development of the Renaissance Age. DreamWorks Animation (later named DreamWorks Pictures) debuted late in the era and eventually became a major competitor to Disney in the following decade. During this era, animation technology underwent a significant shift. Beginning in the mid-1990s, traditional animation using hand-drawn cels declined in favor of novel methods, such as digital ink/paint and 3D computer animation (CGI). These changes in animation technology marked the beginning of Millennium age of American animation, which began in the early 2000s and continues to the present day.

== By genre ==
- Adult animation in the United States
