= J. Stuart Blackton =

American film producer (1875–1941)

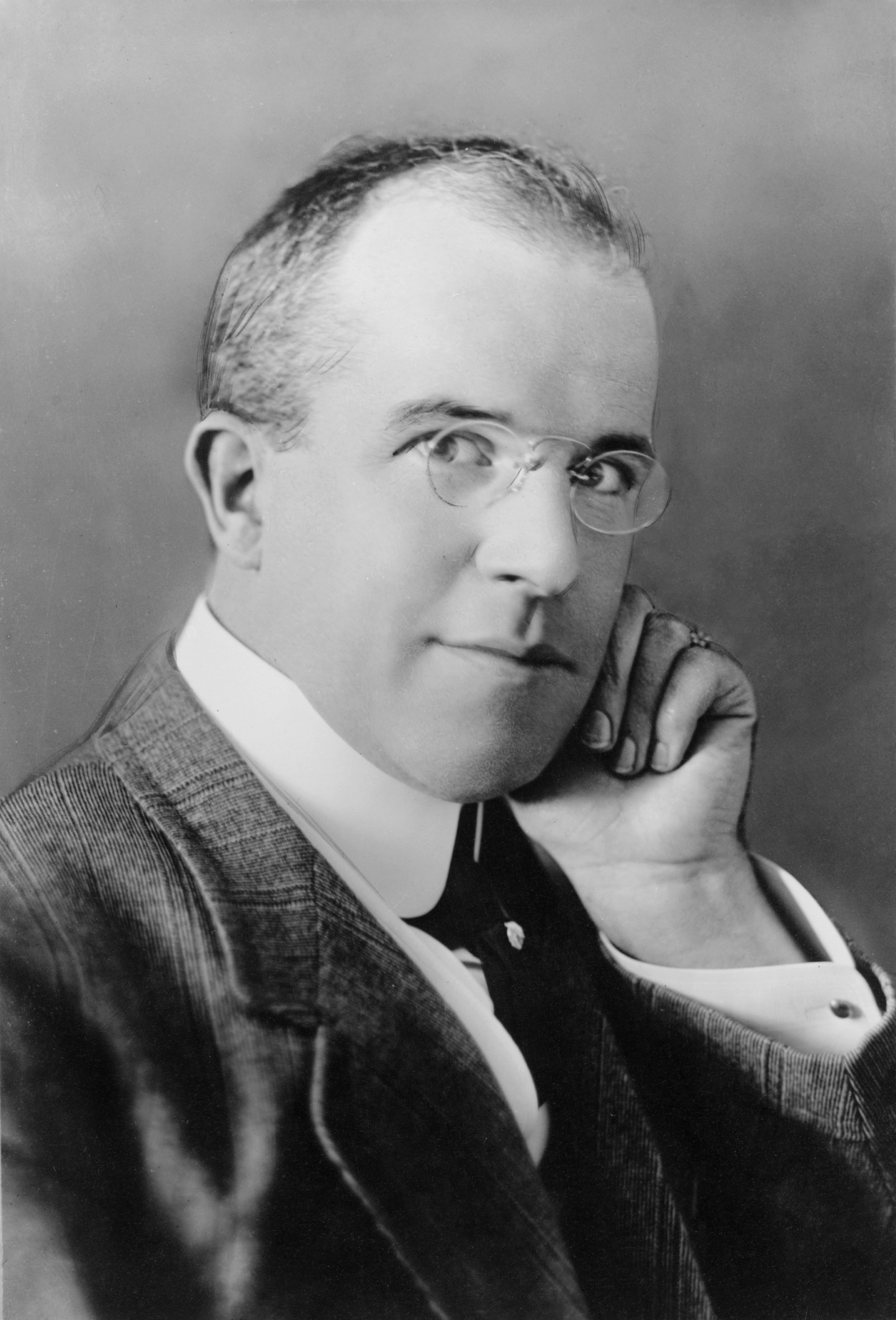
- Blackton in 1912
- Born: James Stuart Blacktin; January 5, 1875; Sheffield, England
- Died: August 13, 1941 (aged 66); Los Angeles, California, U.S.
- Known for: Vitagraph Studios
- Spouses: Isabelle MacArthur (m. 1897; div. 1906); Paula Hilburn (m. 1908–1930; her death); Rachel Helen Stahl (m. 1931–1933; her death); Evangeline Russell (m. 1936)
- Children: 4, including Marian Constance Blackton
- Relatives: Cornell Woolrich (son-in-law)

James Stuart Blackton (January 5, 1875 – August 13, 1941) was a British-American film producer and director of the silent era. One of the pioneers of motion pictures, he founded Vitagraph Studios in 1897. He was one of the first filmmakers to use the techniques of stop-motion and drawn animation, is considered a father of American animation, and was the first to bring many classic plays and books to the screen. Blackton was also the commodore of the Motorboat Club of America and the Atlantic Yacht Club.

== Biography ==
James Stuart Blackton was born on January 5, 1875, in Sheffield, Yorkshire, England, to Henry Blacktin and Jessie Stuart. Henry Blacktin emigrated with his family to the United States in 1885 and changed the family name to Blackton.

He worked as a reporter and illustrator for the New York Evening World, and performed regularly on stage with conjuror Albert Smith. In 1896, Thomas Edison publicly demonstrated the Vitascope, one of the first film projectors, and Blackton was sent to interview Edison and provide drawings of how his films were made. Eager for good publicity, Edison took Blackton to his Black Maria, the special cabin he used to do his filming, and created a film on the spot of Blackton doing a lightning portrait of Edison. The inventor did such a good job selling the art of moviemaking that he talked Blackton and partner Smith into buying a print of the new film, as well as prints of nine other films, plus a Vitascope to show them to paying audiences.

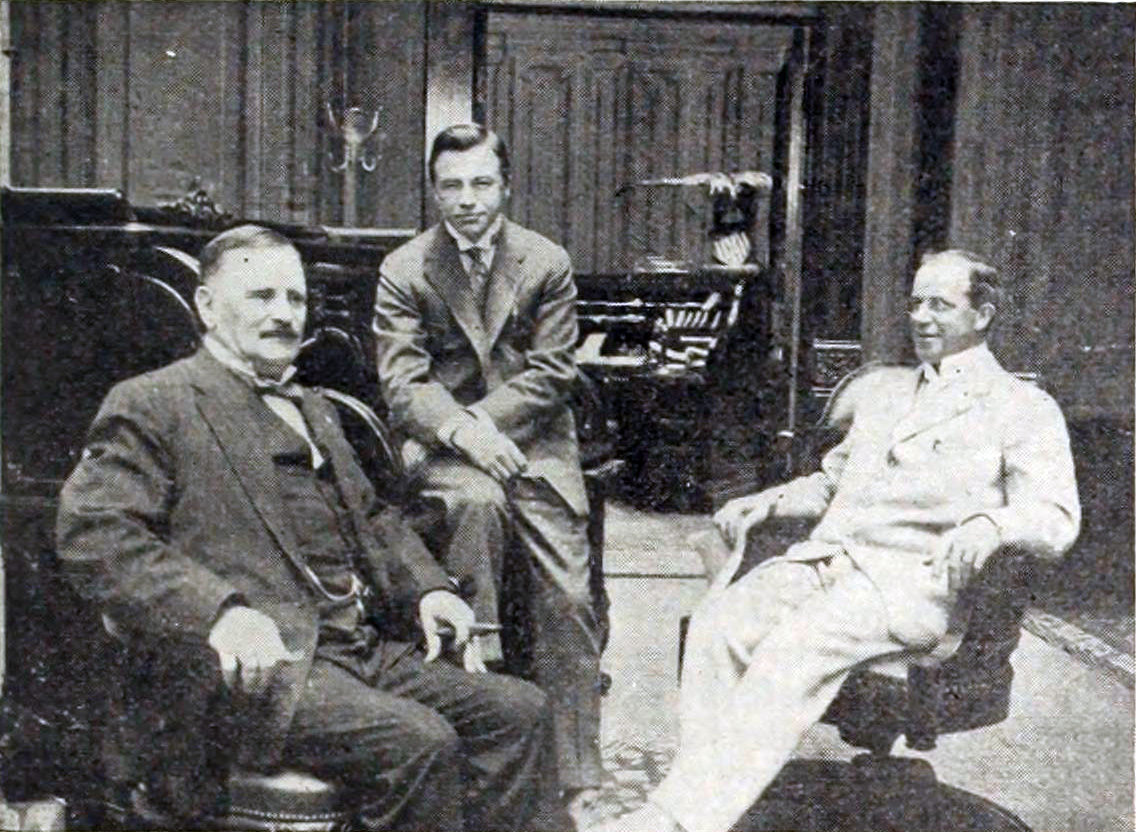
Vitagraph Studios founders William T. Rock, Albert E. Smith and J. Stuart Blackton (1916)

The new act was a great success, despite the various things Blackton and Smith were doing between the Edison films. The next step was to start making films of their own. In this way the American Vitagraph Company was born.

During this period, J. Stuart Blackton ran the Vitagraph studio, and produced, directed, and wrote its films. He even starred in some of his films, playing the comic strip character "Happy Hooligan" in a series of shorts. Since profits were constantly increasing, Blackton felt that he could try any idea that sprang to his head, and in a series of films Blackton developed the concepts of animation.

=== Animated films ===
The first of his animation films is The Enchanted Drawing, with a copyright date of 1900 but probably made at least a year earlier. In this film, Blackton sketches a face, a bottle of wine and a glass, a top hat, and a cigar. During the film he appears to remove the wine, glass, hat, and cigar as real objects, and the face appears to react. The "animation" here is of the stop-action variety, where the camera is stopped, a single change is made, and the camera is then started again. The process was first used by Georges Méliès and others.

The transition to stop-motion was apparently accidental, and occurred around 1905. According to Albert Smith, one day the crew was filming a complex series of stop-action effects on the roof while steam from the building's generator was billowing in the background. On playing the film back, Smith noticed the odd effect created by the steam puffs scooting across the screen and decided to reproduce it deliberately. A few films (some of which are lost) use this effect to represent invisible ghosts, or to have toys come to life. In 1906, Blackton directed Humorous Phases of Funny Faces, which uses stop-motion as well as stick puppetry to produce a series of effects. After Blackton's hand draws two faces on a chalkboard, they appear to come to life and engage in antics. Most of the film uses live action effects instead of animation, but nevertheless this film had a huge effect in stimulating the creation of animated films in America. In Europe, the same effect was had from The Haunted Hotel (1907), another Vitagraph short directed by Blackton. The Haunted Hotel was mostly live-action, about a tourist spending the night in an inn run by invisible spirits. Most of the effects are also live-action (wires and such), but one scene of a dinner making itself was done using stop-motion, and was presented in a tight close-up that allowed budding animators to study it for technique.

Blackton made another animated film that has survived, 1907's Lightning Sketches, but it has nothing to add to the art of animation. In 1908 he made the first American film version of Romeo and Juliet, filmed in New York City's Central Park and The Thieving Hand, filmed in Flatbush, Brooklyn. By 1909, Blackton was too absorbed in the business of running Vitagraph to have time for filmmaking. He came to regard his animation experiments in particular as being rather juvenile (they receive no mention in his unpublished autobiography).

=== Dramatic films and later life ===
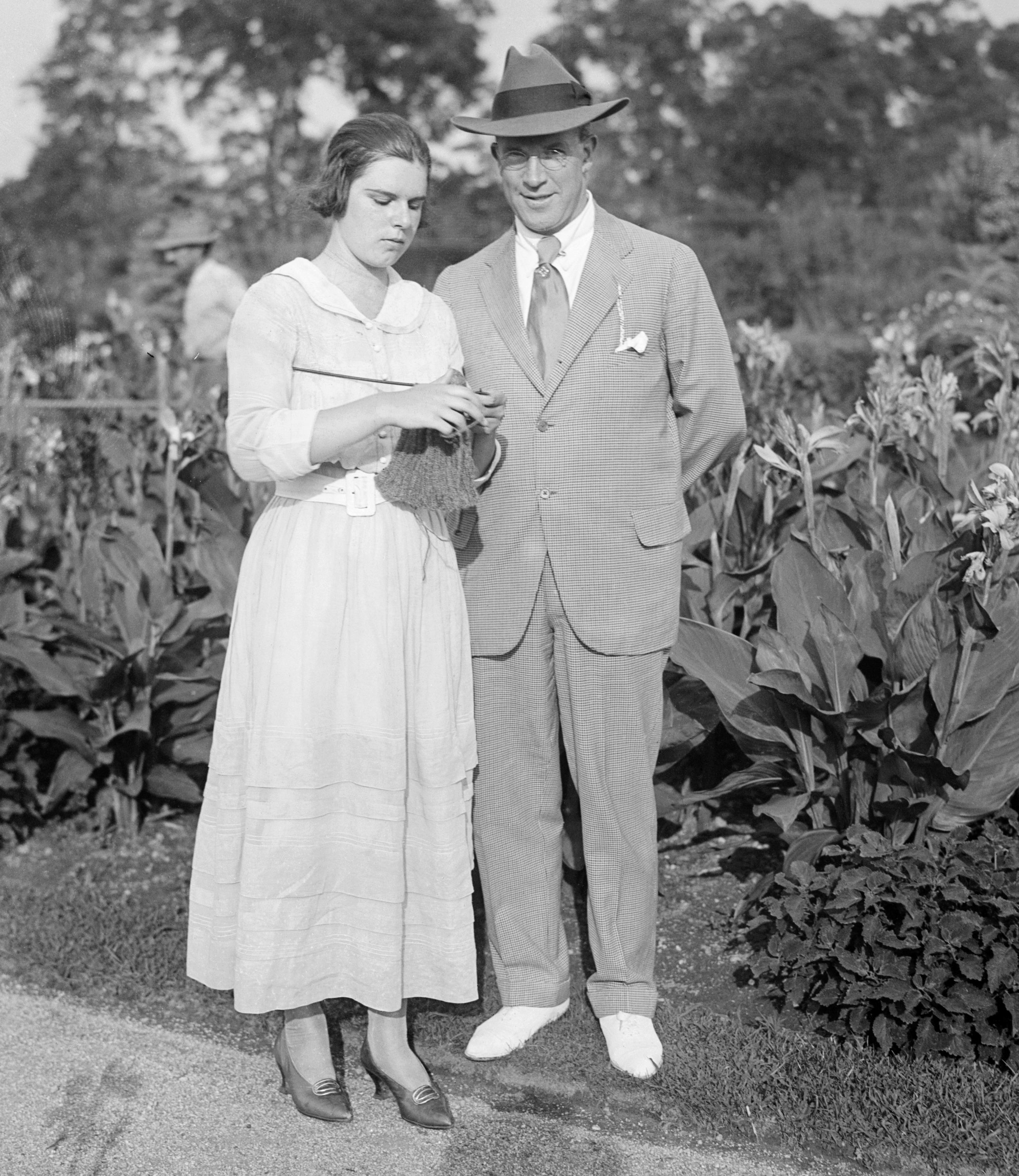
Blackton and daughter Marian Blackton Trimble (1901–1993), author of a personal biography of her father that was edited by film historian Anthony Slide

Stuart Blackton believed that the US should join the Allies involved in World War I overseas and in 1915 produced The Battle Cry of Peace. Former President Theodore Roosevelt was one of the film's staunchest supporters and convinced Gen. Leonard Wood to loan Blackton an entire regiment of marines to use as extras. Upon its release, the film generated a controversy rivaling that of The Birth of a Nation because it was considered as militaristic propaganda.

Blackton left Vitagraph to go independent in 1917, but returned in 1923 as junior partner to Albert Smith. In 1925, Smith sold the company to Warner Brothers for more than $1 million.

Blackton did quite well with his share until the Stock Market Crash of 1929, which destroyed his savings and made him bankrupt in 1931. He spent his last years on the road, showing his old films and lecturing about the days of silent movies. His daughter Violet Virginia Blackton (1910–1965) married writer Cornell Woolrich in 1930 but their marriage was annulled in 1933.

He married actress Evangeline Russell in 1936.

Blackton died August 13, 1941, a few days after he suffered a fractured skull after being hit by a motorist while crossing the street with his son. At the time of his death he was working for Hal Roach on experiments to improve color process backgrounds. Blackton was cremated and interred at Forest Lawn Memorial Park Cemetery in Glendale, California.

== Select filmography ==
The Enchanted Drawing (1900)

Humorous Phases of Funny Faces (1906)

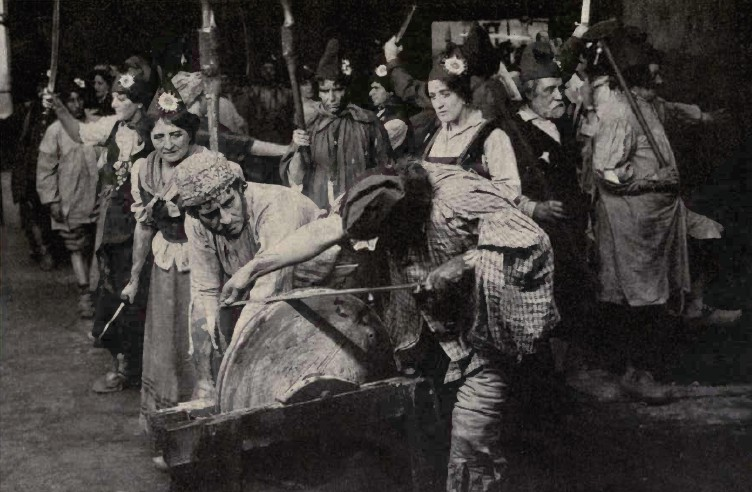
A Tale of Two Cities (1911)

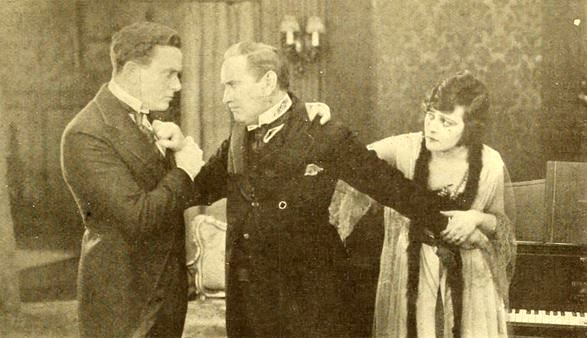
Herbert Rawlinson, Lawrence Grossmith, and Sylvia Breamer in A House Divided (1919)

Year	Title	Notes
1898	The Burglar on the Roof	Short film
1898	Tearing Down the Spanish Flag	Short film
1898	The Humpty Dumpty Circus	Short film
1900	The Enchanted Drawing	Short film
1902	The Twentieth Century Tramp; or, Happy Hooligan and His Airship	Short film
1905	The Adventures of Sherlock Holmes; or, Held for Ransom	Short film
1906	Humorous Phases of Funny Faces	Short film
1906	The Automobile Thieves	Short film
1907	A Curious Dream	Short film
1907	The Haunted Hotel	Short film
1907	Lightning Sketches	Short film
1908	The Thieving Hand	Short film
1908	Macbeth	Short film
1908	Romeo and Juliet	Short film
1908	The Airship, or 100 Years Hence	Short film
1908	Antony and Cleopatra	Short film
1908	Julius Caesar	Short film
1909	The Bride of Lammermoor	Short film
1909	Oliver Twist	Short film
1909	Princess Nicotine; or, The Smoke Fairy	Short film
1909	Les Misérables	
1909	Napoleon, the Man of Destiny	
1909	A Midsummer Night's Dream	Short film
1909	The Life of Moses	
1910	Francesca da Rimini (remake from 1908)	
1910	Uncle Tom's Cabin	
1910	The Last of the Saxons	
1911	Ivanhoe	
1911	Lady Godiva	Short film
1911	A Tale of Two Cities	
1912	Richard III	
1912	Cardinal Wolsey	
1915	The Battle Cry of Peace	
1915	Crooky	
1916	Whom the Gods Destroy	
1917	The Judgment House	
1917	Womanhood, the Glory of the Nation	
1917	The Message of the Mouse	
1918	Life's Greatest Problem	
1918	The World for Sale	
1918	Wild Youth	
1919	The Common Cause	
1920	My Husband's Other Wife	
1920	Passers By	
1920	The Forbidden Valley	
1920	Man and His Woman	
1920	The House of the Tolling Bell	
1922	The Glorious Adventure	
1922	A Gipsy Cavalier	
1923	The Virgin Queen	
1923	On the Banks of the Wabash	
1924	Between Friends	
1924	Let Not Man Put Asunder	
1924	The Beloved Brute	
1924	Behold This Woman	
1924	The Clean Heart	
1925	The Happy Warrior	
1925	The Redeeming Sin	
1925	Tides of Passion	
1926	Bride of the Storm	
1926	Hell-Bent for Heaven	
1926	The Gilded Highway	
1926	The Passionate Quest	
1927	The American	
1934	The Film Parade	

== Archives ==
Blackton's film The Film Parade was restored by the UCLA Film and Television Archive in 2009. The Academy Film Archive preserved Blackton's 1910 film A Modern Cinderella in 2012.
