= The Humpty Dumpty Circus =

Humpty Dumpty Circus
- Directed by: J. Stuart Blackton
- Produced by: Albert E. Smith
- Cinematography: F. A. Dobson
- Distributed by: Kalem Company
- Release date: 1908
- Running time: Unknown
- Country: United States
- Language: Silent

The Humpty Dumpty Circus is a lost short stop-motion trick film directed by J. Stuart Blackton and Albert E. Smith, the Anglo-American founders of Vitagraph Studios. There are no known surviving copies.

It would have been the first stop motion animation by the animator J. Stuart Blackton.

== Background ==
Albert E. Smith claimed in his 1952 book Two reels and a crank: "I used my little daughter's set of wooden circus performers and animals, whose movable joints enabled us to place them in balanced positions. It was a tedious process inasmuch as the movement could be achieved only by photographing separately each change of position. I suggested we obtain a patent on the process; Blackton felt it wasn't important enough. However, others quickly borrowed the technique, improving on it greatly."

The Moving Picture World. Vol. 3. No. 18 reviewed the short in October 1908: "It opens with a crowd of children leaving school and marching through the streets to the "Humpty Dumpty Circus." We see them crowd into the tent and at the end of each act they vociferously applaud the performers. These are the little wooden toys that are familiar to all, and which are made to perform all the usual acrobatic stunts of the circus performer in a remarkably realistic manner. Some of the scenes are really comical and it is hard to believe that the elephants and donkeys are not alive." The magazine continued to describe the costly process and economic circumstances: "The figures are posed in front of the camera, one picture exposed, then they are moved slightly and an other picture exposed, and so on, the photographer being careful not to move the figures or their limbs too far at one time or else a jerky movement is presented. When we consider that there are twelve pictures to a foot of film and that there are 885 feet in the "Humpty Dumpty" subject we begin to realize the magnitude of the task. We are not surprised to learn that the producer worked for several months on the negative, almost without intermission. The negative was made for the Kalem Company by F. E. Dobson, an adept at this kind of work, who was for many years with the Biograph Company. The cost to the Kalem Company far exceeded that of some of their most pretentious dramatic productions, in which large companies of actors are employed. On the standing order basis they expect to just come out about even, but it is a film that should bring many re-orders, as it will be especially popular during the holiday season."

The toy set used was most likely the popular Humpty Dumpty Circus produced by Schoenhut Piano Company from 1903 to 1935 (in various styles). Images that have been thought to be stills from the film may well be pictures of the popular toy set.

== Significance ==
The short has been thought to have been the first film to use the stop-motion technique, based on an estimated release date of 1897 or 1898. This early release date, the use of stop-motion animation and even the existence of the film have been doubted as no proper documentation is known.

Another lost film that probably featured animated dolls entitled The Humpty Dumpty Circus was released in October 1914. It was made by stop motion pioneer Arthur Melbourne-Cooper.
