= Vitagraph Studios =

American film studio

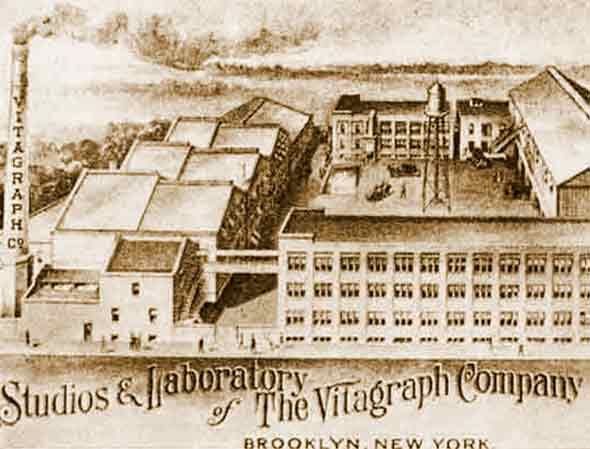
- Industry: Motion picture exhibition, distribution and production
- Founded: 1897; 129 years ago
- Defunct: 1925; 101 years ago
- Fate: Acquired by, folded into Warner Bros. Pictures
- Successor: The Vitaphone Corporation
- Headquarters: Brooklyn, New York
- Products: Motion pictures, film distribution
- Parent: Independent (1914–1925); Warner Bros. Pictures (1925)

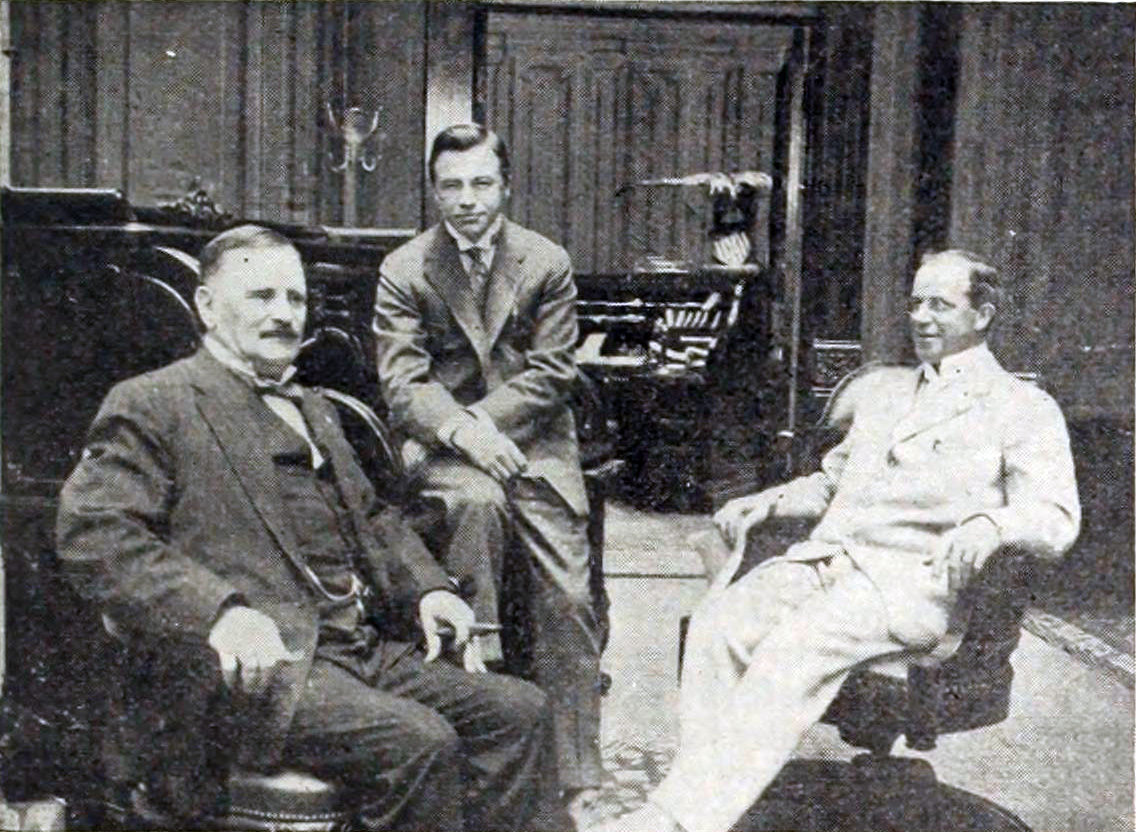
William T. Rock, Albert E. Smith and J. Stuart Blackton, 1916

Vitagraph Studios, also known as the Vitagraph Company of America, was an American film production company. It was founded by J. Stuart Blackton and Albert E. Smith in 1897 in Brooklyn, New York, as the American Vitagraph Company. By 1907, it was the most prolific American film production company, producing many famous silent films. It was bought by Warner Bros. Pictures in 1925.

== History ==
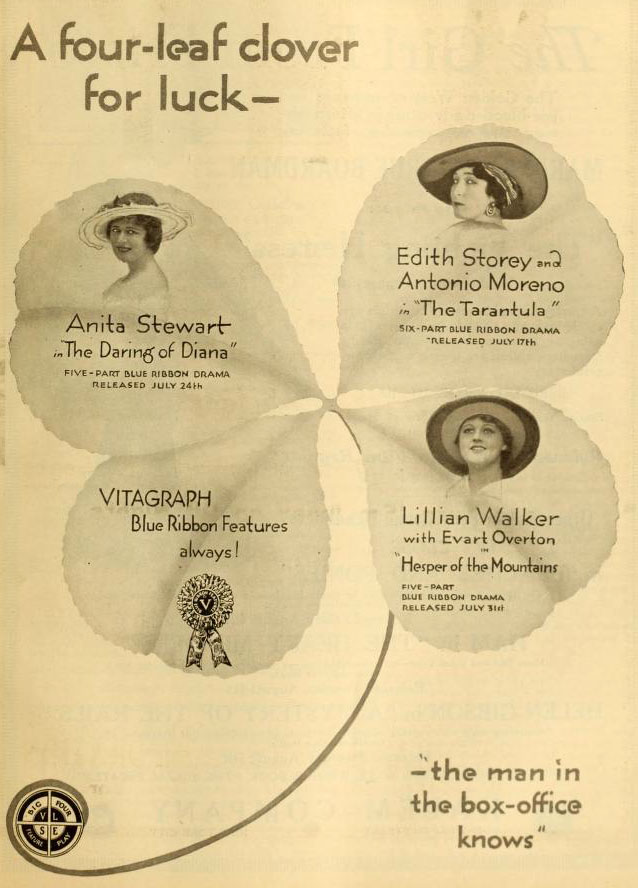
Advertisement for Vitagraph features in The Moving Picture World, 1916

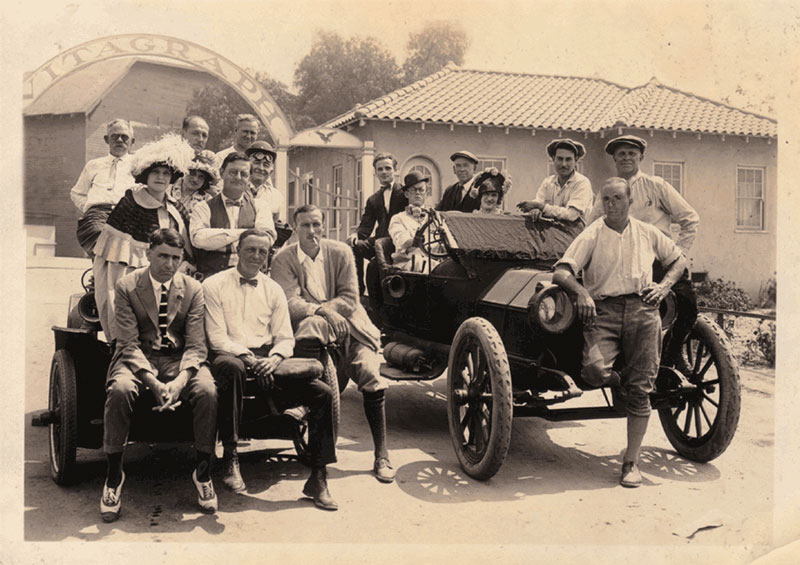
Vitagraph Studios, Hollywood, California

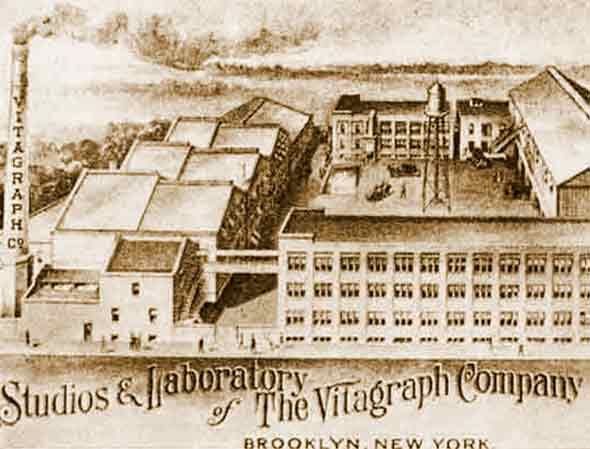
Vitagraph Company, Brooklyn New York, c. 1915

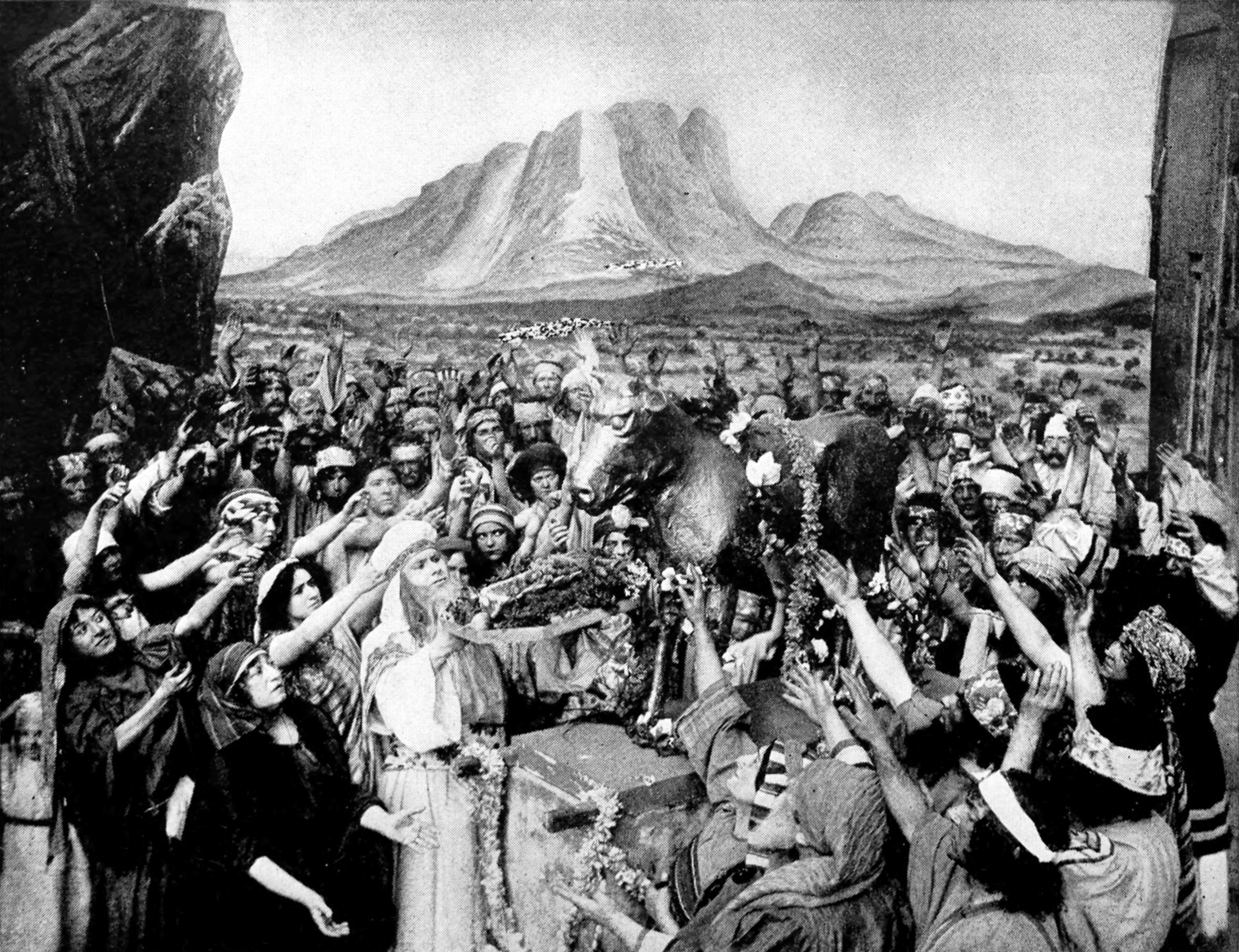
The Life of Moses (1909), directed by J. Stuart Blackton, the first five-reel picture made in America

PLAY Sonny Jim and the Amusement Company Ltd (1915) directed by Tefft Johnson; runtime 00:13:59

PLAY The Good in the Worst of Us (1915) directed by William J. Humphrey; runtime 00:13:05

In 1896, English émigré J. Stuart Blackton was moonlighting as a reporter/artist for the New York Evening World when he was sent to interview Thomas Edison about his new film projector. The inventor talked the entrepreneurial reporter into buying a set of films and a projector. A year later, Blackton and business partner Smith founded the American Vitagraph Company in direct competition with Edison. A third partner, distributor William "Pop" Rock, joined in 1899. The company's first studio was located on the rooftop of a building on Nassau Street in Manhattan. Operations were later moved to the Midwood neighborhood of Brooklyn, New York.

The company's first claim to fame came from newsreels: Vitagraph cameramen were on the scene to film events from the Spanish–American War of 1898. These shorts were among the first works of motion-picture propaganda, and a few had studio re-enactments that were passed off as footage of actual events (The Battle of Santiago Bay was filmed in an improvised bathtub, with the "smoke of battle" provided by Mrs. Blackton's cigar). In 1897, Vitagraph produced The Humpty Dumpty Circus, which was the first film to use the stop-motion technique.

Vitagraph was not the only company seeking to make money from Edison's motion picture inventions, and Edison's lawyers were very busy in the 1890s and 1900s filing patents and suing competitors for patent infringement. Blackton did his best to avoid lawsuits by buying a special license from Edison in 1907 and by agreeing to sell many of his most popular films to Edison for distribution.

The American Vitagraph Company made many contributions to the history of movie-making. In 1903, the director Joseph Delmont started his career by producing westerns; he later became famous by using "wild carnivores" in his films—a sensation for that time.

In 1909, it was one of the original ten production companies included in Edison's attempt to corner movie-making in the United States, the Motion Picture Patents Company. Due to its extensive European distribution interests, Vitagraph also participated in the Paris Film Congress in February 1909. This was a failed attempt by European producers to form a cartel similar to the MPPC.

== Stars ==
Vitagraph's major stars included Florence Turner (the Vitagraph Girl, one of the world's first movie stars), Maurice Costello (the first of the matinee idols), Harry T. Morey, Jean (the Vitagraph Dog and the first animal star of the Silent Era) and such future stars as Helen Hayes, Viola Dana, Dolores Costello, Norma Talmadge, Constance Talmadge, and Moe Howard. Larry Trimble was a noted director of films for Turner and Jean (he was also the dog's owner).

The first film adaptation of the novel Les Misérables, a short silent historical drama starring Maurice Costello as Jean Valjean and William V. Ranous as Javert, is distributed by the Vitagraph Company of America. The film consists of four reels, each released over the course of three months beginning on 4 September to 27 November 1909.

John Bunny made films for Vitagraph in the 1910s – most of which co-starred Flora Finch – and was the most popular film comedian in the world in the years before Charlie Chaplin. His death in 1915 was observed worldwide.

In 1910, a number of movie houses showed the five parts of the Vitagraph serial The Life of Moses consecutively (a total length of almost 90 minutes), making it one of many to claim the title of "the first feature film". A long series of Shakespeare adaptations were the first done of the Bard's works in the U.S.

In 1911, Vitagraph produced the first aviation film, The Military Air-Scout, directed by William J. Humphrey, with future General of the Air Force Hap Arnold as the stunt flier.

The 1915 feature The Battle Cry of Peace (written and directed by Blackton) was one of the great propaganda films of World War I. Ironically, after America declared war, the film was modified for re-release because it was seen as not being sufficiently pro-war, thus also earning the film a place in the history of censorship.

== V-L-S-E, Incorporated ==
In 1915, Chicago distributor George Kleine orchestrated a four-way film distribution partnership, V-L-S-E, Incorporated, for the Vitagraph, Lubin, Selig, L-KO Kompany, and Essanay companies. Albert Smith served as president. In 1916, Benjamin Hampton had proposed a merger of the distribution companies Paramount Pictures and V-L-S-E with Famous Players Film Company and Jesse L. Lasky Feature Play Company, but was foiled by Adolph Zukor. V-L-S-E was dissolved on August 17, 1916, when Vitagraph purchased a controlling interest in Lubin, Selig, and Essanay.

== Postwar prosperity ==
Vitagraph's leading star of the post-World War I period was comedian Larry Semon. He had joined the studio in 1916 as a writer and director, but soon became a star in a steady stream of comedy shorts. A former cartoonist, Semon favored large-scale slapstick. His films were so profitable that Vitagraph gave Semon a free hand in making them, but Semon became so extravagant in staging the films that the expenses nearly broke the company. Semon's relationship with Vitagraph became strained when the company insisted that Semon finance the films himself, and he left for Educational Pictures in 1923.

With the loss of foreign distributors and the rise of the monopolistic studio system, Vitagraph was slowly but surely being squeezed out of the business. On January 28, 1925, it left the Motion Picture Producers and Distributors of America (later MPA); the owner, Albert E. Smith, explained:

Vitagraph withdraws because it does not believe that justice, to the distributors and to the public and to those independent producers who are not theater owning exhibitors, can be obtained through the labors of the Motion Picture Producers and Distributors of America.

== Acquisition by Warner Bros. ==
On April 20, 1925, Smith finally gave up and sold the company to Warner Bros. Pictures for a comfortable profit. The Midwood studio (renamed Vitaphone) was later used as an independent unit within Warner Bros., specializing in early sound shorts. Vitaphone closed the Midwood plant in 1940.

== Vitagraph brand name ==
The Vitagraph name was briefly resurrected on two occasions. In 1932–33, producer Leon Schlesinger made six Westerns starring John Wayne and released them through the Warner Bros. exchanges. The studio chose to market these very-low-budget features under the less prestigious Vitagraph banner. In 1960 Vitagraph returned to theater screens (starting with 1960's Looney Tunes cartoon Hopalong Casualty), with the end titles reading "A Warner Bros. Cartoon / A Vitagraph Release". Merrie Melodies of the same period (starting with that same year's From Hare to Heir) had the same end title, with the last line being "A Vitaphone Release." This may have been done to protect the studio's ownership of the two dormant trade names. Both the Vitagraph and Vitaphone names were retired in 1969.

== Publication ==
Founder Albert E. Smith, in collaboration with coauthor Phil A. Koury, wrote an autobiography, Two Reels and a Crank, in 1952. It includes a very detailed history of Vitagraph and a lengthy list of people who had been in the Vitagraph Family which included Billy Anderson, Florence Lawrence, Florence Turner, Florence Auer, Richard Barthelmess, John Bunny, Francis X. Bushman, Dolores Costello, Maurice Costello, Sidney Drew, Dustin Farnum, Flora Finch, Hoot Gibson, Corinne Griffith, Alan Hale, Oliver Hardy, Mildred Harris, Hedda Hopper, Rex Ingram, Alice Joyce, Boris Karloff, J. Warren Kerrigan, Rod La Rocque, E.K. Lincoln, Bessie Love, May McAvoy, Victor McLaglen, Adolphe Menjou, Antonio Moreno, Conrad Nagel, Mabel Normand, Lottie Pickford, Billy Quirk, Wallace Reid, May Robson, Wesley Ruggles, George Stevens, Anita Stewart, Constance Talmadge, Natalie Talmadge, Norma Talmadge, William Desmond Taylor, Alice Terry, George Terwilliger, Florence Vidor, Earle Williams, Clara Kimball Young, and hundreds of other people are listed. In the text of the book he also refers to hiring a 17-year-old Rudolph Valentino into the set-decorating department, but within a week he was being used by directors as an extra in foreign parts, mainly as a Russian Cossack.

== Locations ==
Vitagraph's first office, opened in 1898, was in Lower Manhattan, at 140 Nassau Street, on the corner of Nassau St. and Beekman St., where they shot their first film, The Burglar on the Roof, in 1897. In 1890, the company moved to 110-16 Nassau Street in Brooklyn, New York. They subsequently opened a glass-enclosed studio, the first modern film studio in the U.S., built in 1906, on property bounded by Locust Avenue, East 15th Street, Elm Avenue, and right-of-way of the BMT Brighton Line of the New York City Subway. Transportation of equipment and costumes from the Nassau Street interior stages was by subway to the adjacent Avenue M (BMT Brighton Line) Subway rapid transit station in the Midwood section of Brooklyn. They created a second film studio in Santa Monica, California, in 1911, and a year later moved to a 29-acre sheep ranch at 4151 Prospect Ave in the Los Feliz district of Los Angeles, a studio subsequently owned by ABC and currently Disney Studios.

== Preservation efforts and demolition ==
The Vitagraph Studios building, located in the Midwood neighborhood of Brooklyn, New York, held a significant place in the early history of American cinema. As one of the first motion picture studios in the United States, Vitagraph was responsible for producing hundreds of silent films in the early 20th century. The building, with its recognizable smokestack, remained a physical reminder of the silent film era long after the studio ceased operations and was acquired by Warner Bros. in 1925.

In the latter half of the 20th century, as New York City’s landscape rapidly changed, film historians and preservationists began advocating for the protection of the Vitagraph building due to its historical importance. The structure became a focus of preservation efforts in the 2000s and 2010s, when campaigns were launched to secure landmark status for the site. Supporters, including local historians and members of the film community, argued that the building was one of the last surviving links to New York’s early role as a hub of film production before Hollywood’s rise. They proposed various uses for the building, including transforming it into a museum or cultural center that would honor the legacy of early cinema.

However, the preservation campaigns faced significant obstacles. Opponents of landmark designation, including developers and some local officials, cited the deteriorating condition of the building and its increasingly outdated industrial design. The site’s location in a developing residential neighborhood further complicated efforts, as developers eyed the property for housing projects. In 2008, the New York City Landmarks Preservation Commission declined to grant the building landmark status, stating that while the Vitagraph building held undeniable cultural significance, it did not meet the architectural criteria for preservation. According to the Commission, “the building has lost many of its original architectural features over the years,” and “the alterations to its structure have compromised its integrity as a historic resource.” The Commission also emphasized that the building's utilitarian design did not exemplify the type of architectural distinction typically associated with landmarks, despite its historical connections. In 2012, they further ruled that the smokestack "lacked architectural merit."

Despite ongoing petitions, appeals, and media attention, the decision stood, and the efforts to protect the building ultimately faltered. In 2015, after years of neglect and unsuccessful attempts to preserve the structure, the Vitagraph Studios building was demolished to make way for new apartment complexes. This demolition marked the end of a tangible piece of early American film history, though it sparked renewed interest in preserving other film heritage sites. Although the building was demolished, its smokestack remains.

== See also ==
- JC Studios
- Cinema of the United States
