= Rhythm guitar =

Technique providing rhythm and harmony to an ensemble

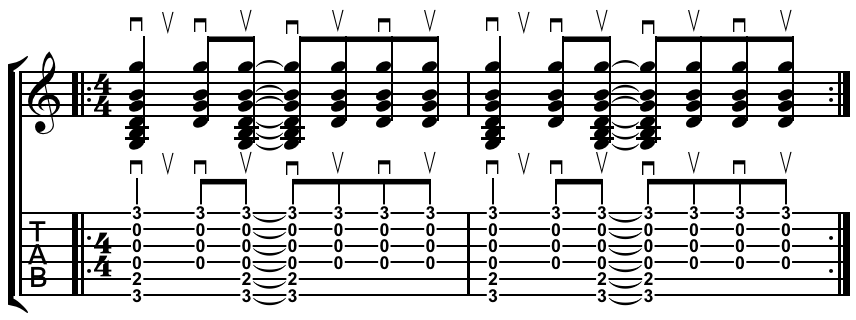
Guitar strum: pattern created by subtracting the second and fifth (of eight) eighth notes from a pattern of straight eighth notes.

E5 power chord in eighth notes

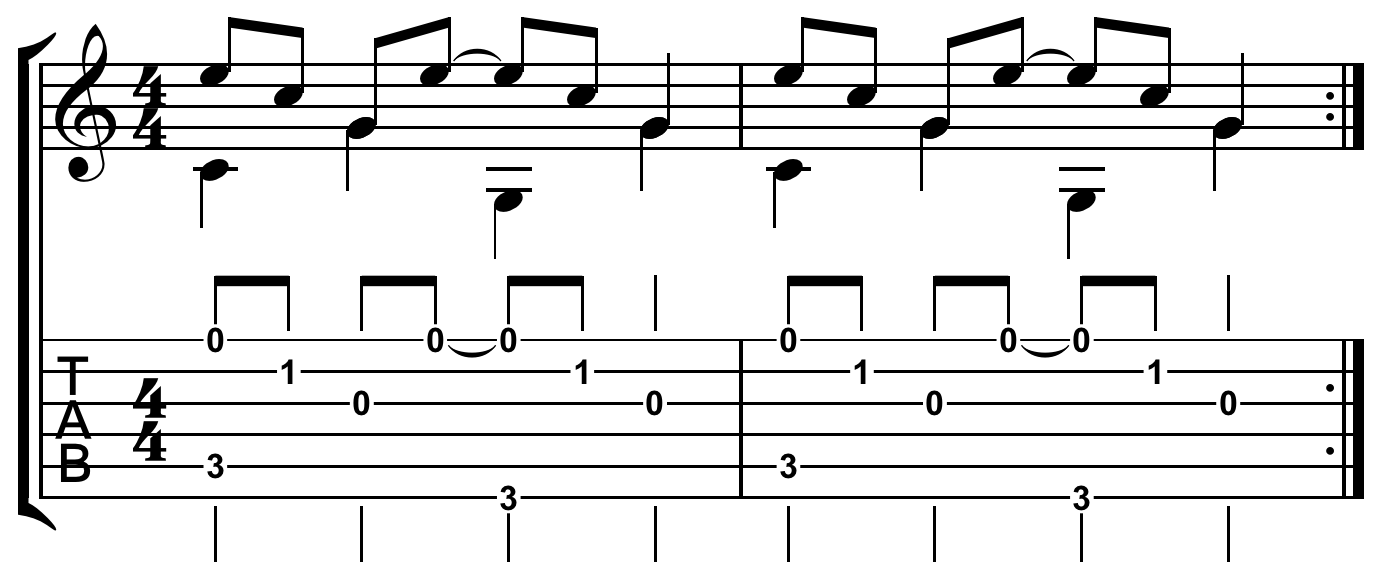
Travis picking.

In music performances, rhythm guitar is a guitar technique and role that performs a combination of two functions: to provide all or part of the rhythmic pulse in conjunction with other instruments from the rhythm section (e.g., drum kit, bass guitar); and to provide all or part of the harmony, i.e. the chords from a song's chord progression, where a chord is a group of notes played together. The basic technique of rhythm guitar is to hold down a series of chords with the fretting hand while strumming or fingerpicking rhythmically with the other hand. More developed rhythm techniques include arpeggios, damping, riffs, chord solos, and complex strums.

In ensembles or bands playing within the acoustic, country, blues, rock or metal genres (among others), a guitarist playing the rhythm part of a composition plays the role of supporting the melodic lines and improvised solos played on the lead instrument or instruments, be they strings, wind, brass, keyboard or even percussion instruments, or simply the human voice, in the sense of playing steadily throughout the piece, whereas lead instruments and singers switch between carrying the main or countermelody and falling silent. In big band music, the guitarist is considered part of the rhythm section, alongside bass and drums.

In some musical situations, such as a solo singer-guitarist, the guitar accompaniment provides all the rhythmic drive; in large ensembles it may be only a small part (perhaps one element in a polyrhythm). Likewise, rhythm guitar can supply all of the harmonic input to a singer-guitarist or small band, but in ensembles that have other harmony instruments (such as keyboards) or vocal harmonists, its harmonic input will be less important.

In the most commercially available and consumed genres, electric guitars tend to dominate their acoustic cousins in both the recording studio and live venues. However the acoustic guitar remains a popular choice in country, western and especially bluegrass music, and almost exclusively in folk music.

== Rock and pop ==
=== Rock and pop rhythms ===
Most rhythms in rock and blues are based on 4/4 time with a backbeat; however, many variations are possible. A backbeat is a syncopated accentuation on the off beat. In a simple 4/4 rhythm these are beats 2 and 4. Emphasized back beat, a feature of some African styles, defined rhythm and blues recordings in the late 1940s and so became one of the defining characteristics of rock and roll and much of contemporary popular music.

=== Rock and pop harmony ===
Harmonically, in rock music, the most common way to construct chord progressions is to play major and minor "triads", each comprising a root, third and fifth note of a given scale. An example of a major triad is C major, which contains the notes C, E and G. An example of a minor triad is the A minor chord, which includes the notes A, C and E. Interspersed are some four-note chords, which include the root, third and fifth, as well as a sixth, seventh or ninth note of the scale. The most common chord with four different notes is the dominant seventh chord, which include a root, a major third above the root, a perfect fifth above the root and a flattened seventh. In the key of C major, the dominant seventh chord is a G^{7}, which consists of the notes G, B, D and F.

Three-chord progressions are common in earlier pop and rock, using various combinations of the I, IV and V chords, with the twelve-bar blues particularly common. A four chord progression popular in the 1950s is I–vi–ii–V, which in the key of C major is the chords C major, A minor, D minor and G^{7}. Minor and modal chord progressions such as I–♭VII–♭VI (in the key of E, the chords E major, D major, C major) feature in popular music.

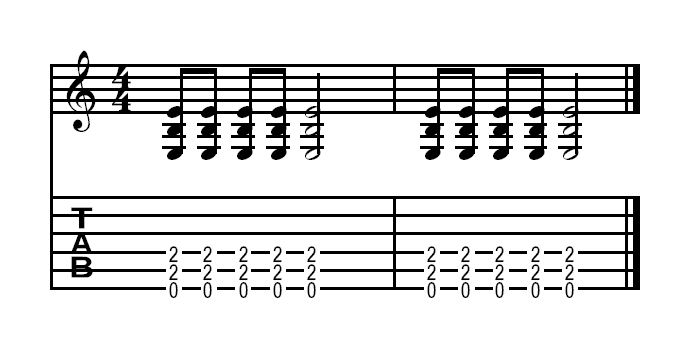
A power chord in E for guitar. This contains the notes E, B (a fifth above) and an E an octave higher.

In heavy metal music, rhythm guitarists often play power chords, which feature a root note and a fifth above, or with an octave doubling the root, all without the third of the chord. Power chords are usually played with distortion.

=== Arpeggios ===
One departure from the basic strummed chord technique is to play arpeggios, i.e. to play individual notes in a chord separately. If this is done rapidly enough, listeners will tend to hear the sequence as harmony rather than melody. Arpeggiation is often used in folk, country, and heavy metal, sometimes in imitation of older banjo techniques. It is also prominent in 1960s pop, such as The Animals' "House of the Rising Sun", and jangle pop from the 1980s onwards. Rhythm guitarists who use arpeggios often favor semi-acoustic guitars and twelve string guitars to get a bright, undistorted "jangly" sound.

The Soukous band TPOK Jazz additionally featured the unique role of mi-solo, (meaning "half solo") guitarist, playing arpeggio patterns and filling a role "between" the lead and rhythm guitars.

=== Riffs ===
In some cases, the chord progression is implied with a simplified sequence of two or three notes, sometimes called a "riff". That sequence is repeated throughout the composition. In heavy metal music, this is typically expanded to more complex sequences comprising a combination of chords, single notes and palm muting. The rhythm guitar parts in compositions performed by more technically oriented bands often include riffs employing complex lead guitar techniques. In some genres, especially metal, the audio signal from the rhythm guitar's output is often subsequently run through some form of effect pedal or overdriven guitar amplifier in order to create a thicker, crunchier sound for the palm-muted rhythms.

=== Interaction with other guitarists ===
In bands with two or more guitarists, the guitarists may exchange or even duplicate roles for various songs or several sections within a song. In those with a single guitarist, the guitarist may play lead and rhythm at numerous times or simultaneously, by overlaying the rhythm sequence with a lead line.

=== Crossover with keyboards ===
Electronic effects units such as delay pedals and reverb units enable electric guitarists to play arpeggios and take over some of the role of a synthesizer player in performing sustained "pads"— ‌soft, mellow timbres, generally used as backing sounds. These can serve as sonic backgrounds in modern pop. Creating a pad sound differs from usual rhythm guitar roles in that it is not rhythmic. Some bands have a synthesizer performer play pads. In bands without a synth player, a guitarist can take over this role.

=== Replacing lead guitar ===
Some rhythm techniques cross over into lead guitar playing. In guitar-bass-and-drums power trios guitarists must double up between rhythm and lead. For instance Jimi Hendrix combined full chords with solo licks, double stops and arpeggios. In recent years, "looping pedals" have been used to supply chord sequences or riffs over which musicians can then play the lead line, simulating the sound achieved by having two guitarists.

=== Equipment ===
A rhythm guitarist usually aims to generate a strong rhythmic and chordal sound, in contrast to the lead guitarist's goal of producing sustained, often higher-pitched melody lines, that listeners can distinguish above the other instruments. As a result, rhythm and lead players often use different guitars and amplifiers. Rhythm guitarists may employ an electric acoustic guitar or a humbucker-equipped electric guitar for a richer and fatter output. Also, rhythm guitarists may use strings of a larger gauge than those used by lead guitarists. However, while these may be practices, they are not necessarily the rule and are subject to the style of the song and the preference of the individual guitarist.

While rhythm guitarists in metal bands use distortion effects, they tend to use less of the modulation effects such as flangers used by lead guitar players. Whereas the lead guitarist in a metal band is trying to make the solo tone more prominent, and thus uses a range of colorful effects, the rhythm guitarist is typically trying to provide a thick, solid supporting sound that blends in with the overall sound of the group. In alternative rock and post-punk, however, where the band may be aiming to create an ambient soundscape rather than an aggressive Motörhead-style "wall of sound", the rhythm guitarist may use flanging and delay effects to create a shimmering background, or (as in The Smiths song "How Soon Is Now?"), a reverberating tremolo effect.

== Jazz ==
Rhythm guitar has been especially important in the development of jazz. The guitar took over the role previously occupied by the banjo to provide rhythmic chordal accompaniment.

Early jazz guitarists like Freddie Green tended to emphasize the percussive quality of the instrument. The ability to keep a steady rhythm while playing through complicated chord patterns made the guitar invaluable to many rhythm sections. Jazz guitarists are expected to have deep knowledge of harmony.

=== Jazz harmony ===
Jazz guitarists use their knowledge of harmony and jazz theory to create jazz chord "voicings", which emphasize the 3rd and 7th notes of the chord. Unlike pop and rock guitarists, who typically include the root of a chord (even, with many open chords and barre chords, doubling the root), jazz guitarists typically omit the root. Some more sophisticated chord voicings also include the 9th, 11th, and 13th notes of the chord. A typical jazz voicing for the chord G7 would be the individual notes B, E, F, and A. This voicing uses the 3rd (the note B), the 7th (the note F), along with the 6th (the note E) and the 9th (the note A).

In some modern jazz styles, dominant 7th chords in a tune may contain altered 9ths (either flattened by a semitone, which is called a "flat 9th", or sharpened by a semitone, which is called a "sharp 9th"); 11ths (sharpened by a semitone, which is called a "sharp 11th"); 13ths (typically flattened by a semitone, which is called a "flat 13th").

Jazz guitarists need to learn about a range of different chords, including major 7th, major 6th, minor 7th, minor/major 7th, dominant 7th, diminished, half-diminished, and augmented chords. As well, they need to learn about chord transformations (e.g., altered chords, such as "alt dominant chords" described above), chord substitutions, and re-harmonization techniques. Some jazz guitarists use their knowledge of jazz scales and chords to provide a walking bass-style accompaniment.

Jazz guitarists learn to perform these chords over the range of different chord progressions used in jazz, such as the II-V-I progression, the jazz-style blues progression, the minor jazz-style blues form, the "rhythm changes" progression, and the variety of chord progressions used in jazz ballads, and jazz standards. Guitarists may also learn to use the chord types, strumming styles, and effects pedals (e.g., chorus effect or fuzzbox) used in 1970s-era jazz-Latin, jazz-funk, and jazz-rock fusion music.

=== Big band rhythm ===
In jazz big bands, popular during the 1930s and 1940s, the guitarist is considered an integral part of the rhythm section (guitar, drums and bass). They usually played a regular four chords to the bar, although an amount of harmonic improvisation is possible. Freddie Green, guitarist in the Count Basie orchestra, was a noted exponent of this style. The harmonies are often minimal; for instance, the root note is often omitted on the assumption that it will be supplied by the bassist.

=== Small group comping ===
When jazz guitarists play chords underneath a song's melody or another musician's solo improvisations, it is called comping, short for accompanying. The accompanying style in most jazz styles differs from the way chordal instruments accompany in many popular styles of music. In many popular styles of music, such as rock and pop, the rhythm guitarist usually performs the chords in rhythmic fashion which sets out the beat or groove of a tune. In contrast, in many modern jazz styles within smaller, the guitarist plays much more sparsely, intermingling periodic chords and delicate voicings into pauses in the melody or solo, and using periods of silence. Jazz guitarists commonly use a wide variety of inversions when comping, rather than only using standard voicings.

=== Gypsy pumping ===
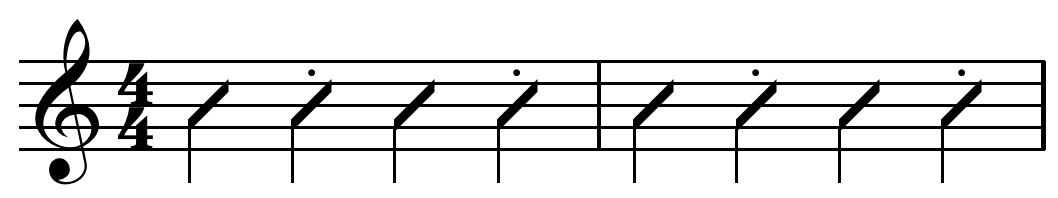
La Pompe.

Gypsy jazz is acoustic music, usually played without a drummer. Rhythm guitar in gypsy jazz uses a special form of strumming known as "la pompe", i.e. "the pump". This form of percussive rhythm is similar to the "boom-chick" in bluegrass styles; it is what gives the music its fast swinging feeling. The strumming hand, which never touches the top of the guitar, must make a quick up-down strum followed by a down strum. The up-down part of la pompe must be done extremely fast, regardless of the tempo of the music. It is very similar to a grace note in classical music, albeit the fact that an entire chord is used. This pattern is usually played in unison by two or more guitarists in the rhythm section.

=== Jazz chord soloing ===
Jazz guitar soloists are not limited to playing single notes by their instrument. This allows them to create "chord solos" by adding the song's melody on top of the chord voicings. Wes Montgomery was noted for playing successive choruses in single notes, octaves and finally a chord solo. This technique differs from chord-melody soloing in that it is not intended to be used unaccompanied

== Funk ==
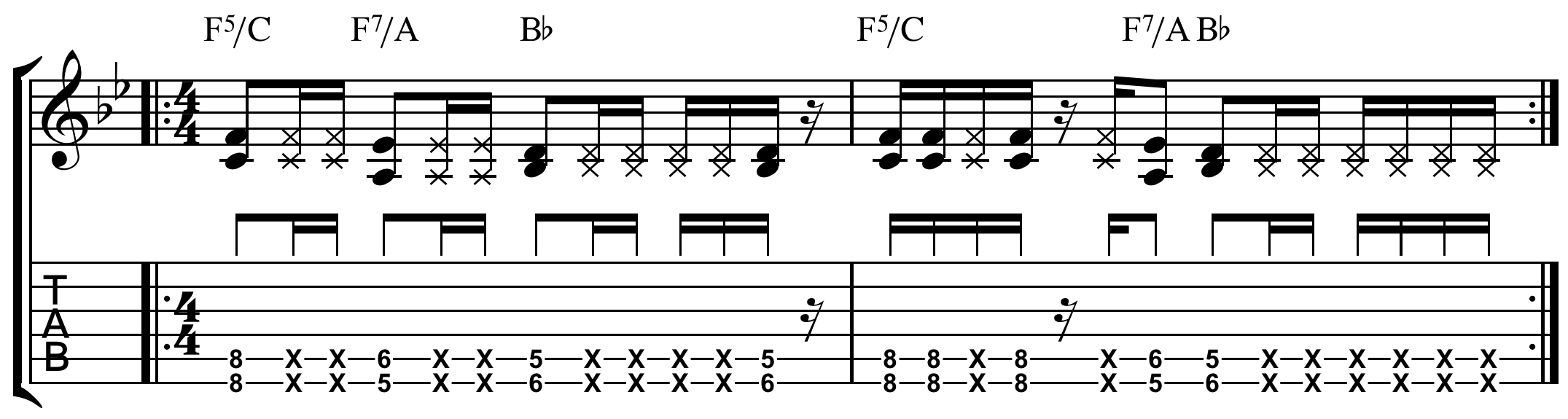
Vamp riff typical of funk and R&B.

Funk utilized the same extended chords found in bebop jazz, such as minor chords with added sevenths and elevenths, or dominant seventh chords with altered ninths. However, unlike bebop jazz, with its complex, rapid-fire chord changes, funk virtually abandoned chord changes, creating static single chord vamps with little harmonic movement, but with a complex and driving rhythmic feel. Some have jazz backgrounds. The chords used in funk songs typically imply a dorian or mixolydian mode, as opposed to the major or natural minor tonalities of most popular music. Melodic content was derived by mixing these modes with the blues scale.

In funk bands, guitarists typically play in a percussive style, often using the wah-wah sound effect and muting the notes in their riffs to create a percussive sound. Guitarists Ernie Isley of The Isley Brothers and Eddie Hazel of Funkadelic were notably influenced by Jimi Hendrix's improvised solos. Eddie Hazel, who worked with George Clinton, is a notable guitar soloist in funk. Ernie Isley was tutored at an early age by Jimi Hendrix himself, when he was a part of The Isley Brothers backing band and lived in the attic temporarily at the Isleys' household. Jimmy Nolen and Phelps Collins are famous funk rhythm guitarists who both worked with James Brown.

== Reggae ==
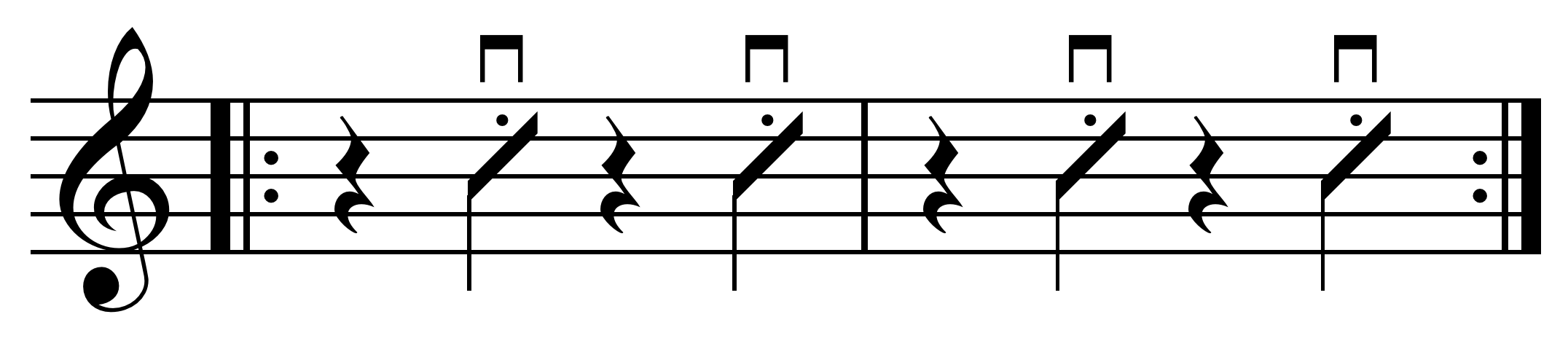
Reggae downstroke pattern.

Skank at different harmonic rhythms

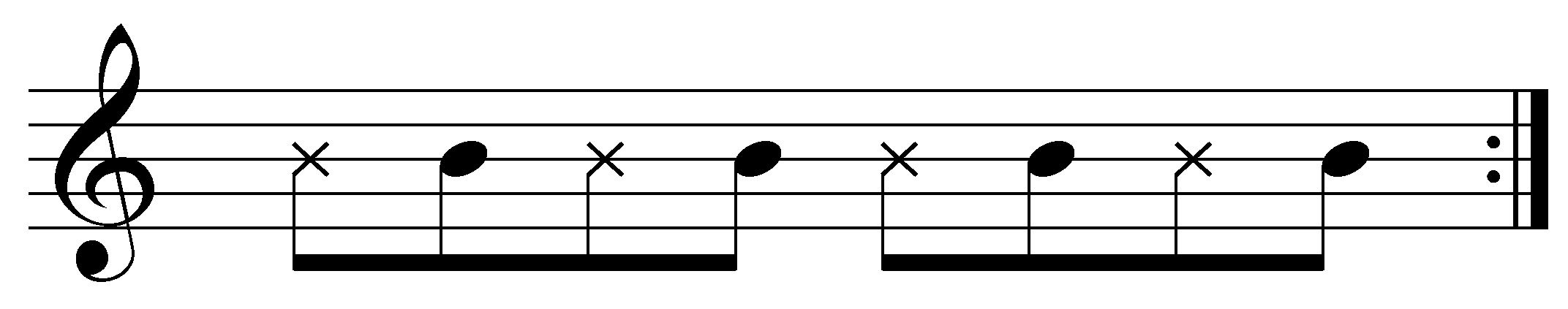
Reggae guitar pattern

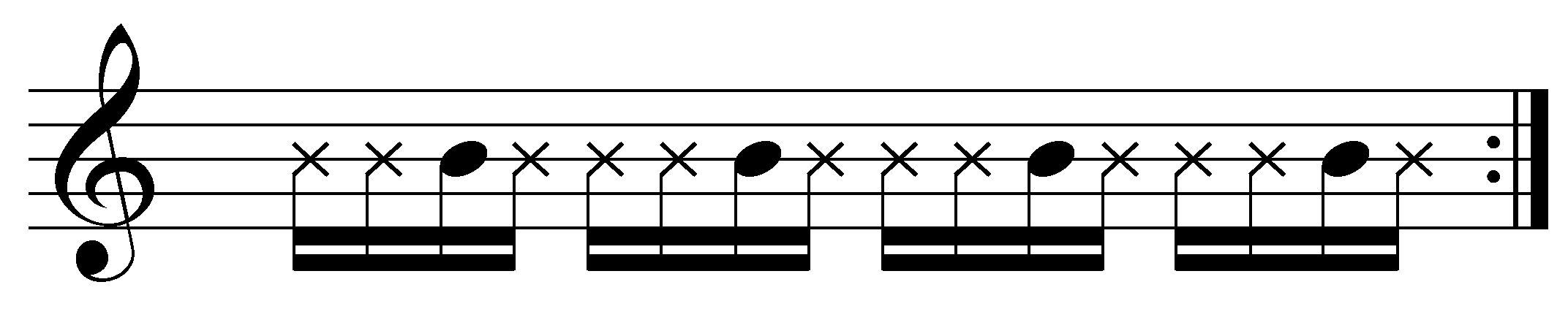
Reggae guitar pattern

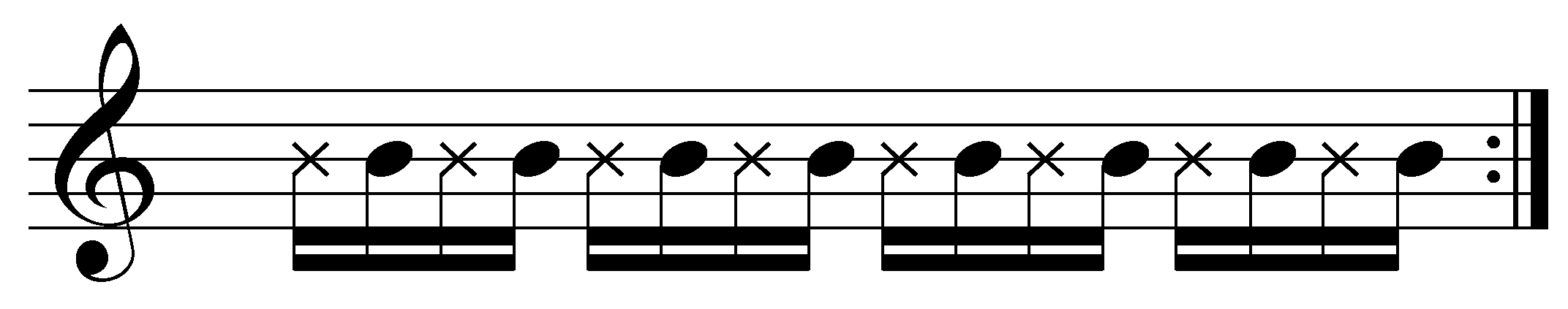
Ska guitar pattern

The guitar in reggae usually plays the chords on beats two and four, a musical figure known as skank or the 'bang'. It has a very dampened, short and scratchy chop sound, almost like a percussion instrument. Sometimes a double chop is used when the guitar still plays the off beats, but also plays the following 16th or 8th beat on the up-stroke. Depending on the amount of swing or groove, this next secondary stab is often the 16th note sounding closer to an 8th placement in the rhythm. An example is the intro to "Stir It Up" by The Wailers. Artist and producer Derrick Harriott says, "What happened was the musical thing was real widespread, but only among a certain sort of people. It was always a down-town thing, but more than just hearing the music. The equipment was so powerful and the vibe so strong that we feel it." Reggae chords are typically played without overdrive or distortion.

== See also ==
- List of rhythm guitarists
- Flamenco guitar
- Steel guitar
- John Lennon
