= Chop chord =

Clipped backbeat

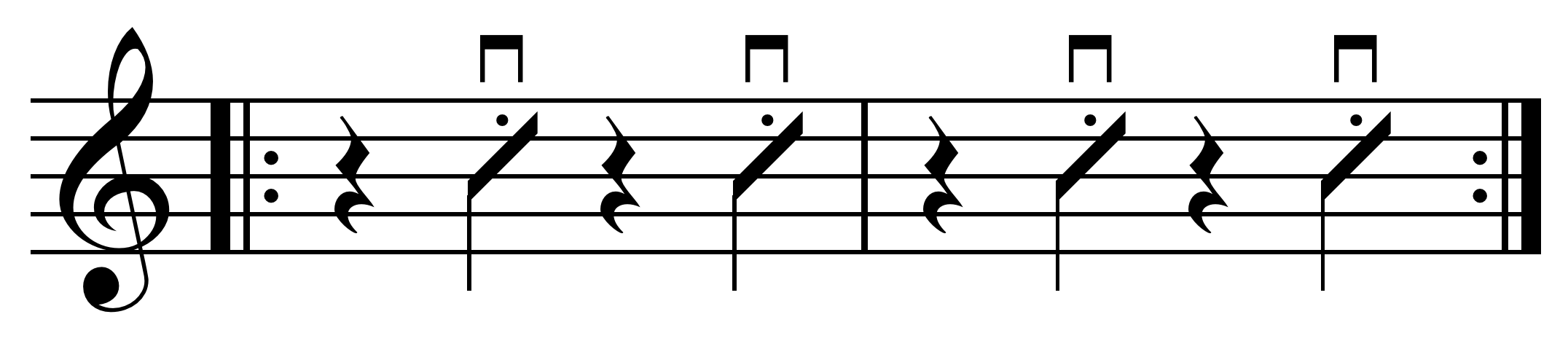
Backbeat chop

In music, a chop chord is a "clipped backbeat". In 4/4: 1 2 3 4. It is a muted chord that marks the off-beats or upbeats. As a rhythm guitar and mandolin technique, it is accomplished through chucking, in which the chord is muted by lifting the fretting fingers immediately after strumming, producing a percussive effect.

The chop is analogous to a snare drum beat and keeps the rhythm together and moving. It's one of the innovations bluegrass inventor Bill Monroe pioneered, and it gave the music a harder groove and separated it from old-time and mountain music.

— Dix Bruce

Traditional bluegrass bands typically do not have a drummer, and the timekeeping role is shared between several instruments. The upright bass generally plays the on-beats, while the banjo keeps a steady eighth-note rhythm. The mandolin plays chop chords on the off-beats or upbeats. (see: boom-chick) By partially relaxing the fingers of the left hand soon after strumming, the strings are allowed to rise off the frets, and their oscillations are damped by the fingers. All strings are stopped (fingered); open strings are not played in chop chords.

The offbeat was played on the piano in rhythm and blues "shuffle" style, as heard in songs like Louis Jordan's "It's a Low-Down Dirty Shame" (1942) and Professor Longhair's "Willie Mae" (1949). This popular, danceable shuffle style was present on many early rock and roll records. It was played on the electric guitar at least as early as 1950 by Robert Kelton on Jimmy McCracklin's "Rockin' All Day." Either played on the guitar, piano or both, the "chop", "chuck" or "skank" offbeat eventually influenced Jamaican rhythm and blues of the 1950s, which morphed into ska in late 1962, then rocksteady and reggae, all of which featured the offbeat "chuck" or "skank" guitar.

== Guitar ==
The "chuck" usually consists of a downward strum on the up beat notes. Alternatively, the bass note can be played and allowed to ring, with the remainder of the chord being "chucked" on the up beat. This technique is usually used in a rhythmically simple manner, such as chucking on every beat, or bass notes on down beats and chucking on up beats. Freddie Green, Django Reinhardt and Nile Rodgers are known for this technique.

== Mandolin ==
Mandolin "chunks", or more commonly known as "chops", rarely include a down-beat strum. When a mandolin is playing rhythm it is most often in conjunction with other instruments, such as guitar and bass, which produce the main beat. The mandolin contributes to the rhythm by producing a sharp "chunk" on the upbeat notes. This is particularly common when playing bluegrass music. According to Andy Statman, "the mandolin can drive and push the band in the same way (as) a snare drum."

== Fiddle ==
The chop was introduced to fiddle playing by Richard Greene in the 1960s.

== See also ==
- Banjo roll
- Bluegrass mandolin
- Ska stroke
