= Mukhina Gully =

- Russian: Мухина балка
- IUCN category Ia (strict nature reserve)
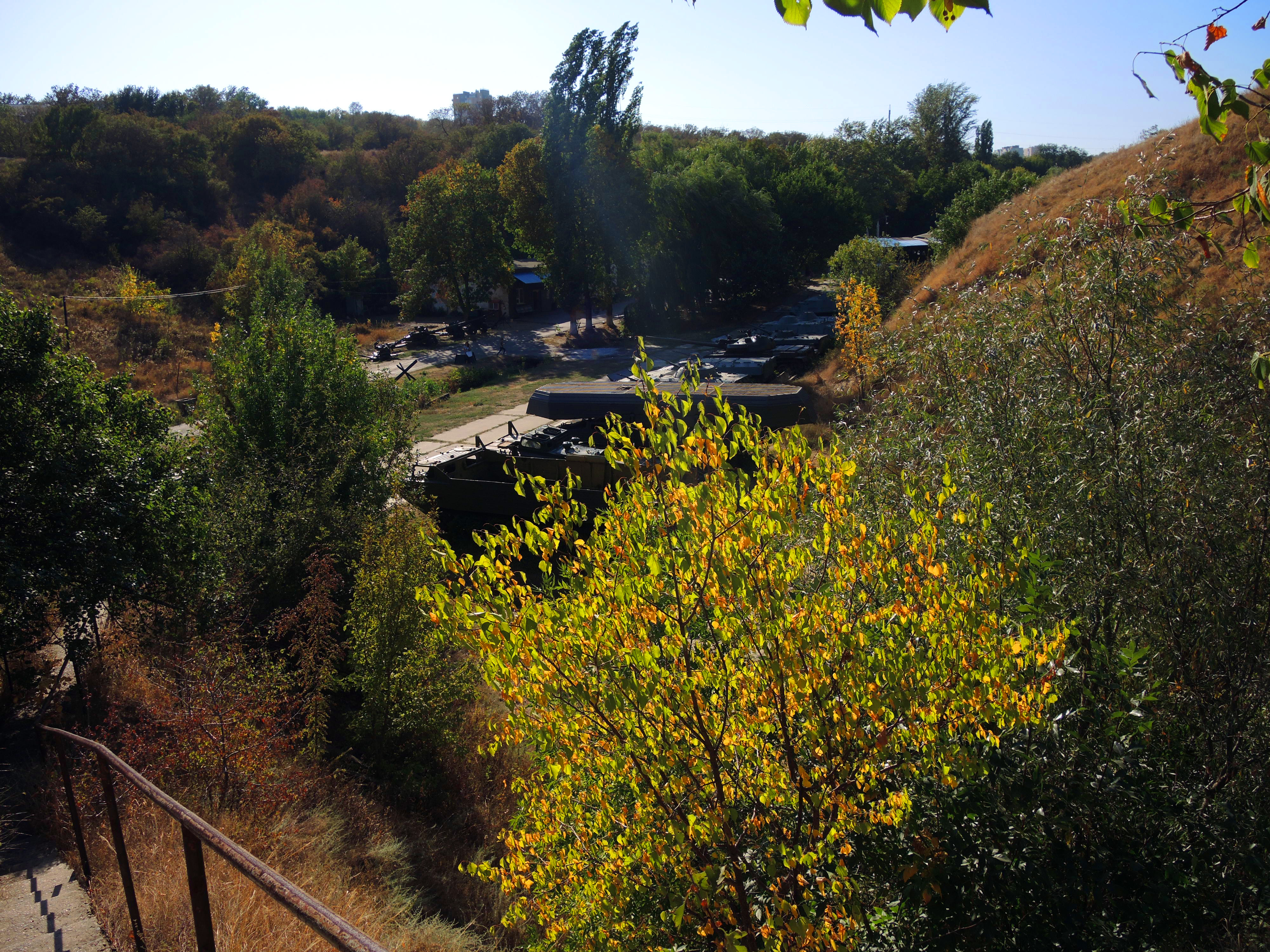

- Location within Russia
- Location: Rostov Oblast
- Nearest city: Aksai
- Coordinates: 47°16′22″N 39°53′24″E
- Governing body: Ministry of Natural Resources and Environment (Russia)

Mukhina Gully (Russian: Мухина балка, Mukhina balka, Малый лог, Maly Log) is a protected nature reserve of regional importance, situated in the city of Aksay, Rostov Oblast, Russia. The gully is a steep ravine in the eastern Aksay, the slopes of which are covered with forest. Most of the gully's territory is occupied by swamps. The reserve also hosts Aksay Military History Museum with an open-air exhibition of military equipment and a bunker constructed in the 1960s.

== Flora ==
Various steppe plants grow on the slopes of Mukhina gully, like fescue and feather grass. Dandelion, wormwood, bluegrass, knotweed, Melilotus officinalis, clover and plantain are also widespread.

Currently Mukhina Gully is in poor condition. The area is being plowed and people frequently build fires there. Landfill grows on, the springs are not cleared and the pond is not sealed. The construction of houses and garages continues.

== History ==
In the 18th century Mukhina Gully was called Maly Log. Later it was renamed and became known as Ryabinovaya Gully. Its current name is obliged to the Mukhin family, who were merchants and possessed the territory of 79 hectares in Aksai. Mukhins were one of the richest timber merchants in Russia. They were engaged in a very profitable at the time timber trade. There, in the steppe region, the forests never grow, so the timber was sold at a very high price.

In 1915 students and teachers of the University of Warsaw (which was evacuated to Rostov-on-Don in case of a possible occupation of Warsaw by German troops) began to study Mukhina Gully. Mukhina Gully was considered to be the most typical representative of the vegetation of the area, which had on its territory the virgin steppe, shrubland, rocky and clay slopes, forest and meadow beam.

The nature reserve was severely damaged during World War II. The slopes of gully were a place of battle three times. The centuries-old oak trees and other rare trees were cut down for a better view of the area. The traces of trenches and antitank ditches are still visible.
