= Strum =

Way of playing a stringed instrument

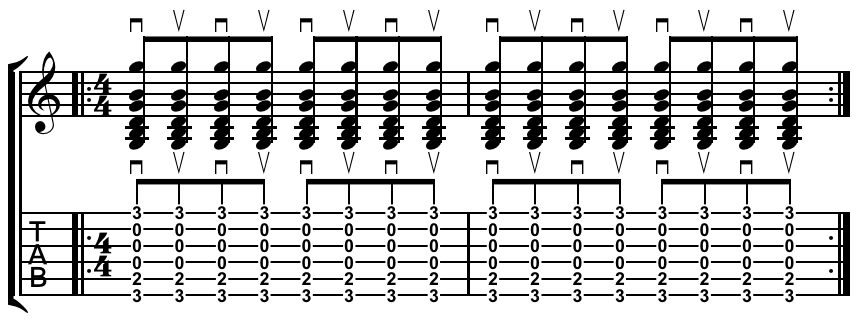
Guitar strum: base pattern on open G tuning. Strumming is used to create a chord. Many patterns are created through subtracting beats from this base.

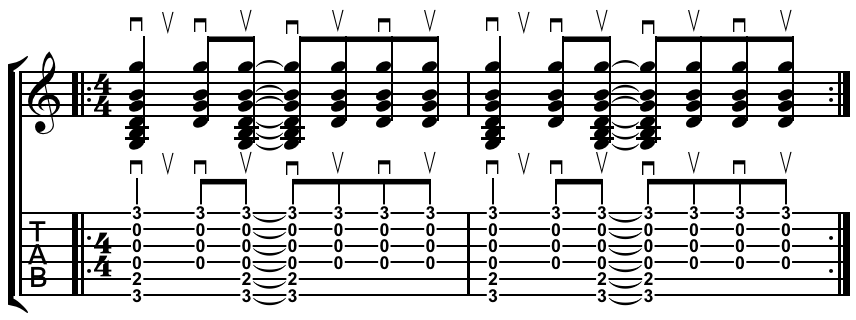
Guitar strum: pattern created by subtracting the second and fifth (of eight) eighth notes from the base, above.

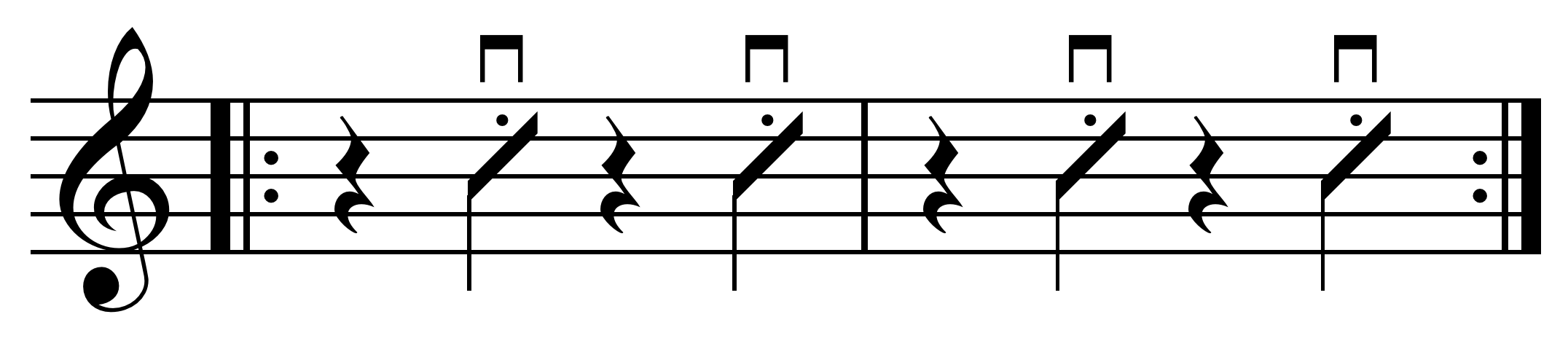
Ska stroke: features dampened staccato upbeat downstrokes.

In music, strumming is a way of playing a stringed instrument such as a guitar, ukulele, or mandolin. A strum or stroke is a sweeping action where a finger or plectrum brushes over several strings to generate sound. On most stringed instruments, strums are typically executed by a musician's designated strum hand (typically the musician's dominant hand, which is often responsible for generating the majority of sound on a stringed instrument), while the remaining hand (referred to as the fret hand on most instruments with a fingerboard) often supports the strum hand by altering the tones and pitches of any given strum.

Strums are often contrasted with plucking, as a means of vibrating an instrument's strings. In plucking, a specific string or designated set of strings are individually targeted to vibrate, whereas in strumming, a less precise targeting is usually used. Compared to other plucking techniques, any group of strings brushed in a single sweep by a plectrum could be considered a strum due to the plectrum's less precise string group targeting (however, a plectrum might simultaneously pluck a small group of strings without being considered a strum). In contrast, a musician could utilize a technique with more precise string group targeting (such as a fingerstyle or fingerpick technique) to pluck all the strings on a stringed instrument at once and this would still be considered a pluck, not a strum.

== Notation ==
There are a variety of methods for writing strum notation.

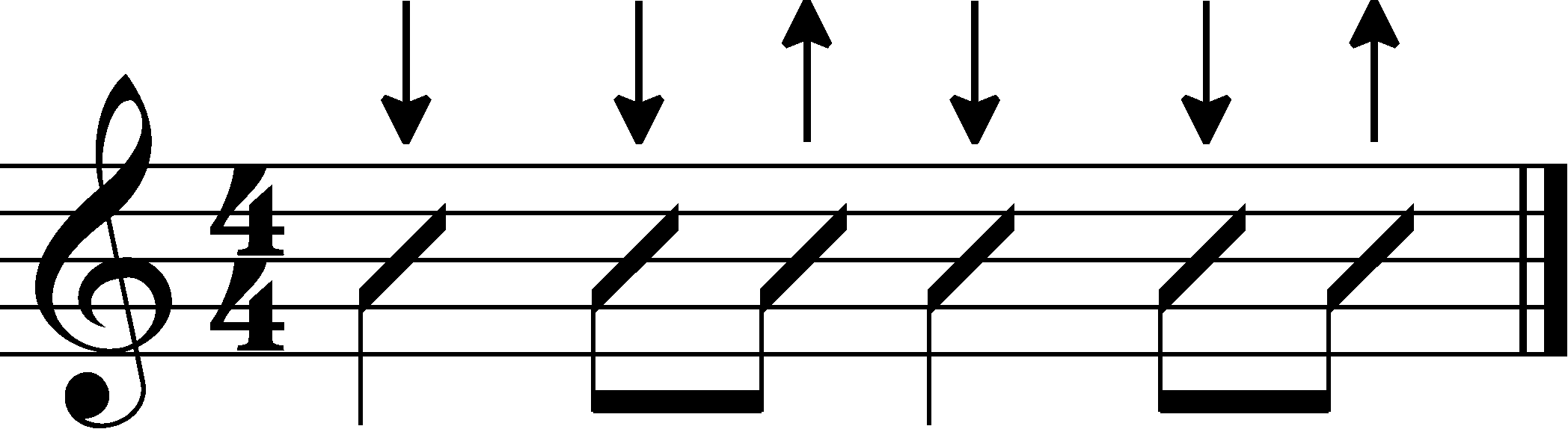
Arrow notation

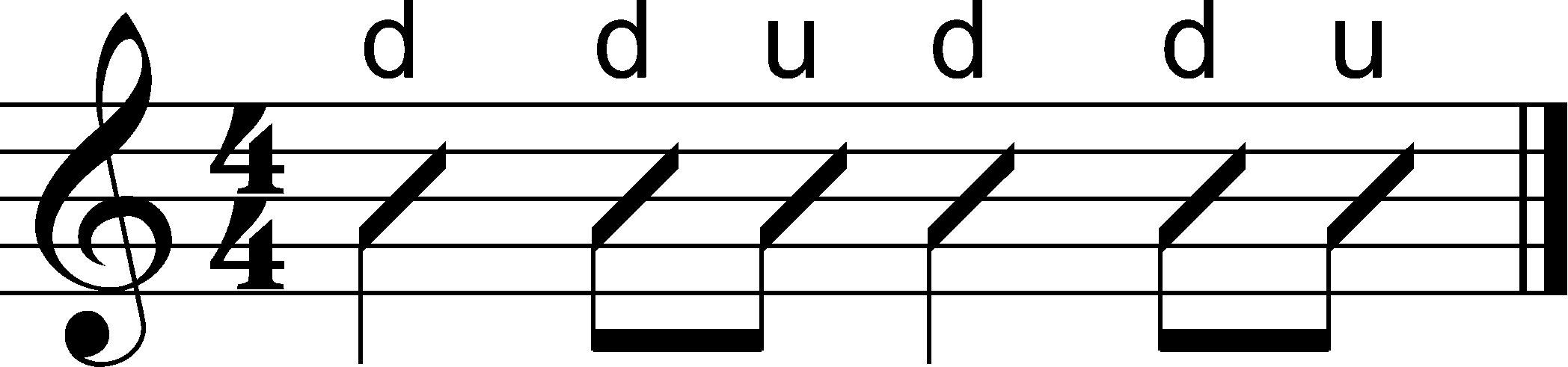
Letter notation

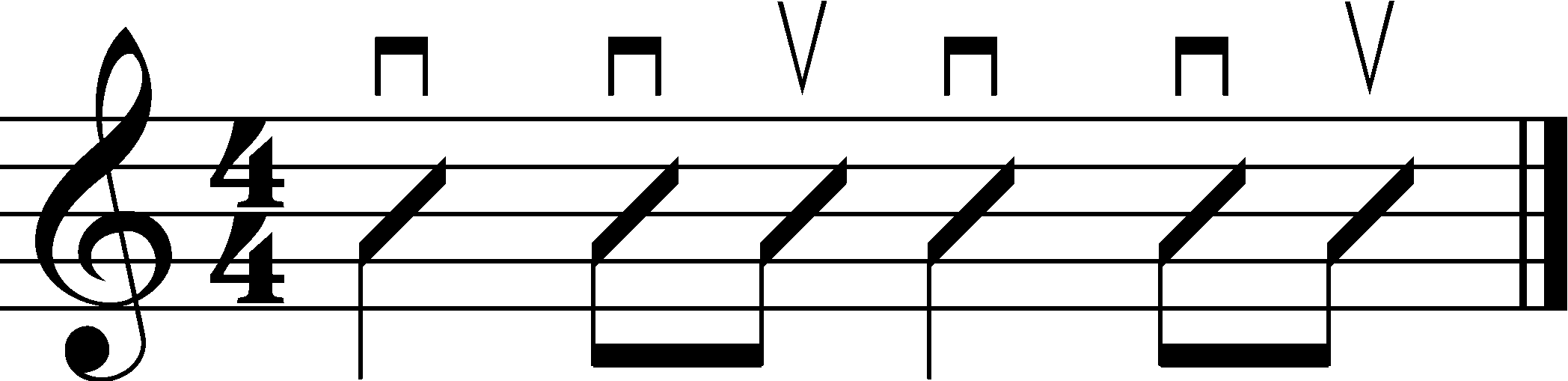
Traditional notation

== Strumming patterns ==
A strumming pattern or strum is a preset pattern used by a rhythm guitar. For example, a pattern in common time or 4/4 consisting of alternating down and up eighth note strokes may be written:

1&2&3&4&
dudududu

=== Rock and pop ===
The pattern most typical of rock and related styles is:

1&2&3&4&
d du udu

The final upstroke is sometimes omitted altering the strumming pattern slightly to d du ud. This pattern is often called "Old Faithful", or when played on ukulele, the "Island Strum".

Examples of other strumming patterns include:

- Single down strum: d d d d
  - Elvis' "Burning Love"
  - Kathy Mattea's "What Could Have Been"
- Boom-chicka: d dud du
  - Merle Haggard's "Silver Wings"

=== Jazz and funk ===
The simple four-to-a-bar rhythm is associated with jazz guitarists such as Freddie Green, although they may subtly vary the rhythm of a chord on some beats to add interest.

A simple eight-to-a-bar (8 eighth notes) rhythm is known as "straight eights" as opposed "swung eights", in which each pair are played in a rhythm that resembles the first and third notes in a triplet.

The fretting hand can also mute the strings on the fretboard to damp a chord, creating staccato and percussive effects. In reggae and ska, a few staccato "chops" are played per bar. In funk rhythm playing, the strumming hand keeps a fairly steady motion in 16th notes, while the left hand, basically holding down a jazz chord damps some of them in a syncopated pattern.

== Fingerstyle strumming strokes ==
Some of the many possible fingerstyle strums include

- A slow downstroke with the thumb. This is a sforzando or emphatic way of playing a chord.
- Light "brushing" strokes with the fingers moving together at a near-perpendicular angle to the strings. Works equally in either direction and can be alternated for a chord tremolo chord effect.
- Upstrokes with one finger make a change from the standard downstroke strum.
- A "pinch" with the thumb and fingers moving towards each other gives a crisp effect. It is helpful to clearly articulate the topmost and bass note in the chord, as if plucking, before "following through".
- Rasgueado: Strumming is typically done by bunching all the right-hand fingers and then flicking them out in quick succession to get four superimposed strums. The rasgueado or "rolling" strum is particularly characteristic of flamenco.
- Turning p-a-m-i tremolo plucking into a series of downstrokes. This is a lighter version of the classic rasgueado, which uses upstrokes.

== See also ==
- Harmonic rhythm
