= Damping (music) =

Technique for altering the sound of an instrument

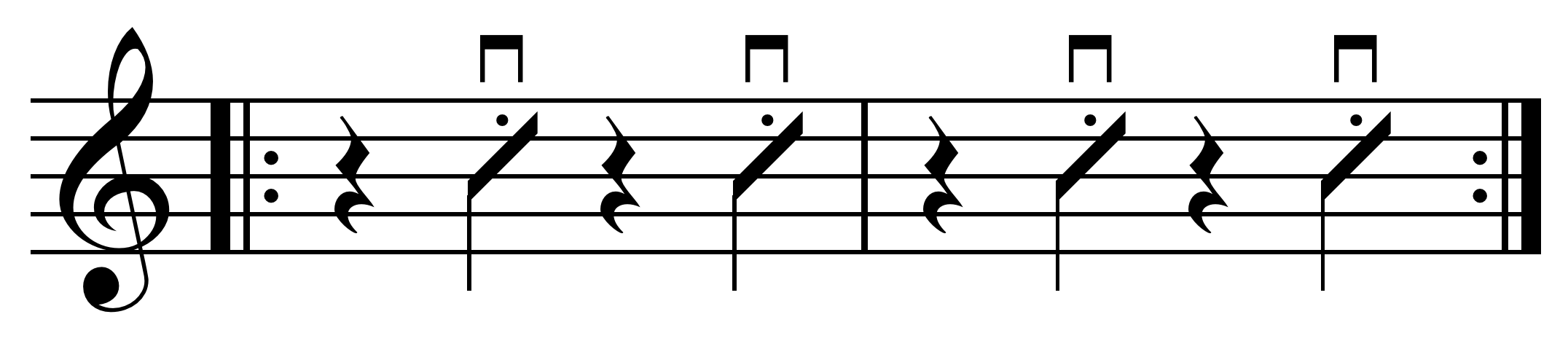
Ska stroke: features dampened downbeat downstrokes and staccato upbeat upstrokes.

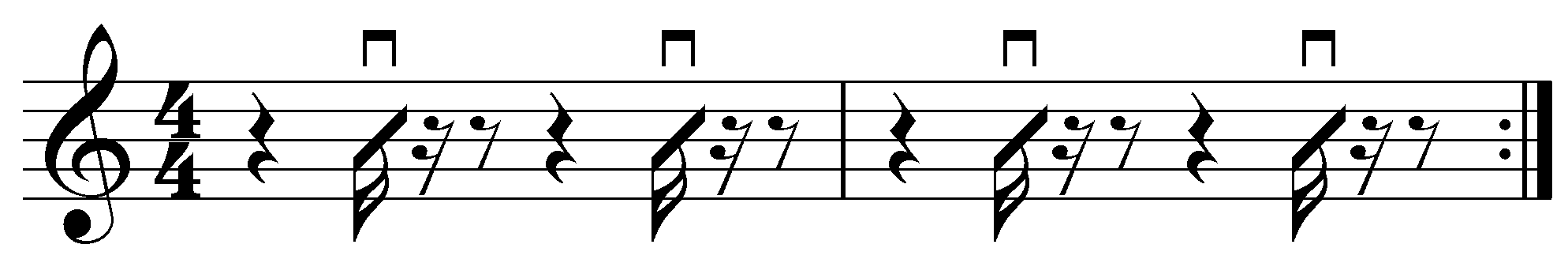
Though notated with quarter notes, the Ska stroke sounds like sixteenth notes due to muting or dampening.

Damping is a technique in music for altering the sound of a musical instrument by reducing oscillations or vibrations. Damping methods are used for a number of instruments.

== Strings ==
Damping is often necessary on string instruments where strings may resonate sympathetically, or be accidentally brushed or rubbed, creating noise. There are many techniques used to counteract this.

=== Guitar ===
On guitar, damping (or choking) can be accomplished with the right hand, by contacting the strings (palm muting), or the left, by relaxing the pressure applied to the strings (left-hand muting).

Scratching is playing the strings while damped. In funk music this is often done over a sixteenth note pattern with occasional sixteenths undamped.

Floating is sustaining chord past a sixteenth note in the context of scratching. The term refers to the motion of the right hand, which hovers or "floats" over the strings.

Skanking is when a note is isolated by left hand damping of the two strings adjacent to the fully fretted string, producing the desired note (the adjacent strings are scratched). The technique is ubiquitous in ska, rocksteady and reggae, where it is used in virtually every riddim.

== Percussion ==
Percussion instruments, such as timpani or cymbals, often resonate for a long time. To control the length of the notes, percussionists will often have to either place their hands on the instrument or use a pedal mechanism as in the case of tubular bells and pedal glockenspiels.

=== Vibraphone ===
Mallet dampening on the vibraphone is an important technique that facilitates legato phrasing on the instrument. It is accomplished by striking a note on one of the bars of the instrument while the pedal is depressed and then using the head of the same or another mallet to stop the vibrations of the bar without raising the pedal.

There are many benefits of being proficient in this technique as a vibraphonist. As it allows a player to hold out one chord and add or subtract any individual pitch desired, a vibist can transition between chords much more smoothly than a pianist who cannot stop a string from vibrating without reaching inside the instrument when the pedal is down. Most modern vibraphonists are highly skilled in this technique.

=== Cymbals ===
On cymbals, choking is an important technique that can add punctuation or heighten musical tension.

=== Piano ===
When a piano key is pressed, the damper for that note is raised and a hammer strikes the string. Unless the sustain pedal is depressed, releasing the key allows the damper to return to place, damping the note.

=== Hammered dulcimers ===
While the keys on modern pianos control both the hammers and dampers, this is not possible with the hand-held hammers used to play some other members of the box zither family. Historical players such as Joseph Moskowitz sometimes used their coat sleeves as dampers, but pedal-operated dampers were one of the main distinguishing features of the concert cimbalom developed by Jószef Schunda in 1874 and are now often added to larger or more expensive American hammered dulcimers, Eastern European dulcimers, and Greek sandouris. They are rarely if ever found on the Romanian ţambal mic, the Iranian santur, or the Indian santoor.

== See also ==
- Cymbal choke
- Ghost note
- Mute
