= Polish reggae =

Music genre

Reggae is one of the most popular music genres in Poland. The rastafari philosophy is considered to constitute the main influence on Polish reggae. The majority of songs are sung in Polish, yet a Silesian group R.A.P. provides an important exception to both of the above, since its members clearly stated to have nothing to do with the rasta movement and sung almost exclusively in English.

Some of the popular bands include: Izrael, R.A.P. (Reggae Against Politics), Daab, Habakuk, Pajujo, Love Sen-C Music, Indios Bravos, Natural Dread Killaz, and Vavamuffin.
The reggae group Izrael (1983-1995), from Warsaw, which released at least three albums on Tess Records, has been cited as an example of reggae's popularity in Poland.
The reggae group R.A.P. (Reggae Against Politics) (1985-1987), from Gliwice, did not manage to release any albums during their short existence but their music was not forgotten and in the late 1990s four bootleg albums were legally released by labels Zima Records and Kaya Production. In 2011 Zima Records released R.A.P.'s first official studio album, originally recorded in 1986.

The Warsaw Village Band has been noted to take traditional Polish folk songs and add a reggae touch.

== History ==
Bob Marley's music is credited as introducing reggae to Poland, and beginning a vibrant reggae movement there. According to reggae studies professor Carolyn Cooper, Marley's lyrics of "resistance against the system" have been a basis of inspiration for some human rights demonstrations in Poland. Another influence was British Rastafarian band Misty in Roots, who played live in the country in 1983 and 1986. In the 1980s Polish Rastafarians appeared. The first Polish reggae song was performed by the band Budka Suflera in 1974 - Sen o dolinie, music by Bill Withers - Ain't No Sunshine, Polish lyrics by Krzysztof Cugowski. The first homegrown Polish reggae groups started in the 1980s, and some even took on the reggae look, complete with dreadlocks. Some Polish reggae groups were included on the compilation album MUP: Reggae from Around the World, on RAS Records. In 1999, reggae music was a prominent part of Woodstock Junction, an annual music festival in Żary, Poland. Polish-language reggae has retained its popularity over the years, and an all-Polish-language radio station in New York state is more likely to play reggae music than polka music (which might not come as a surprise, since polka music does not originate from Poland).
