= Ska stroke =

Technique of strumming the guitar

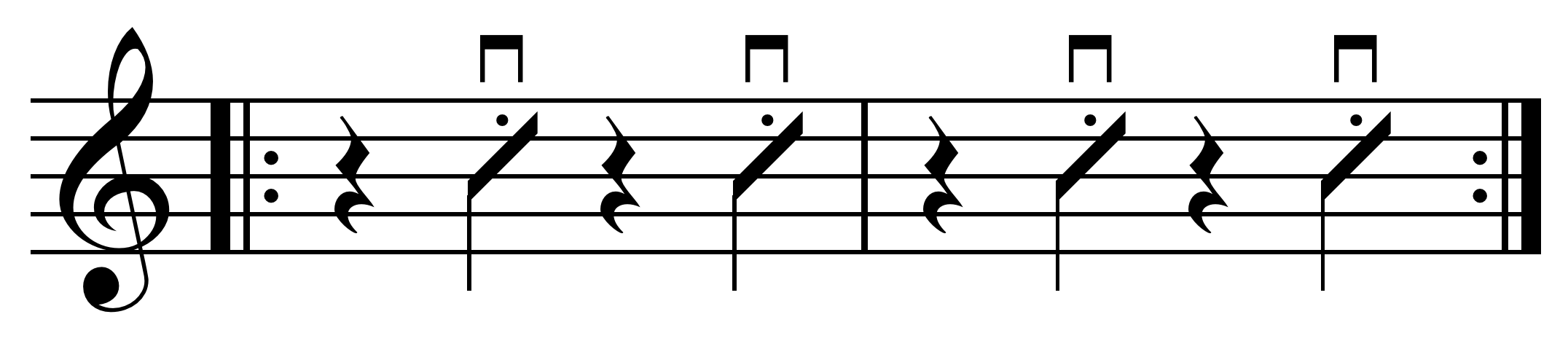
Reggae downstroke pattern.

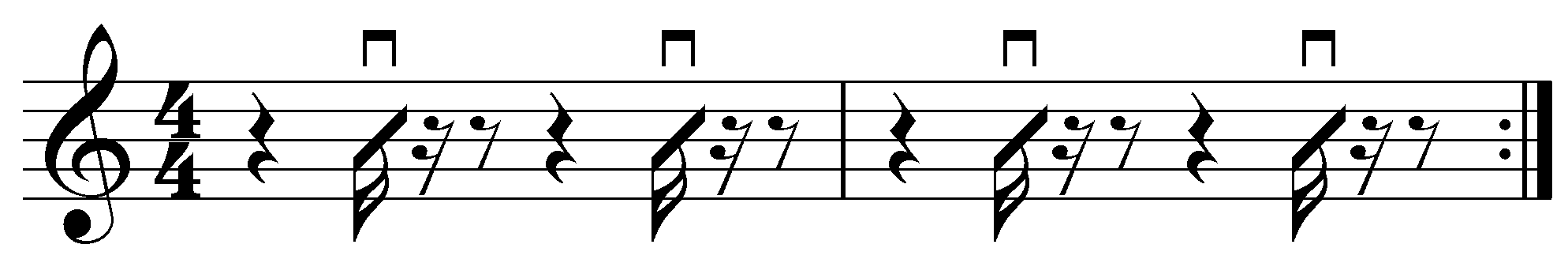
Though notated with quarter notes, the Ska stroke sounds like sixteenth notes due to muting or dampening.

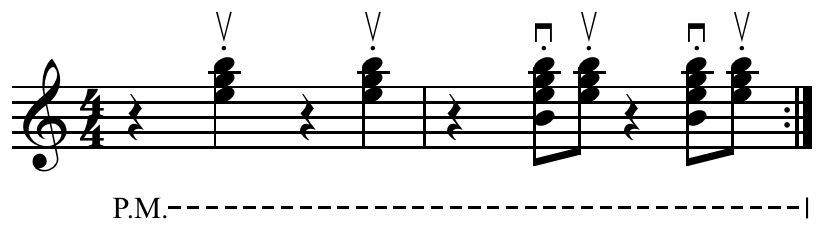
Reggae upstroke pattern.

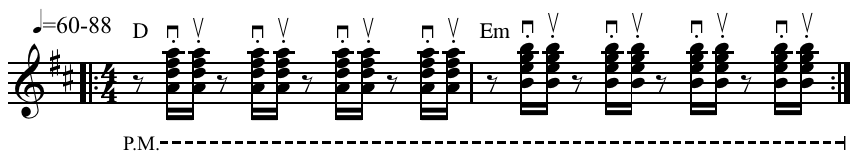
Skank guitar rhythm often considered "'the' reggae beat" or.

Skank at different harmonic rhythms

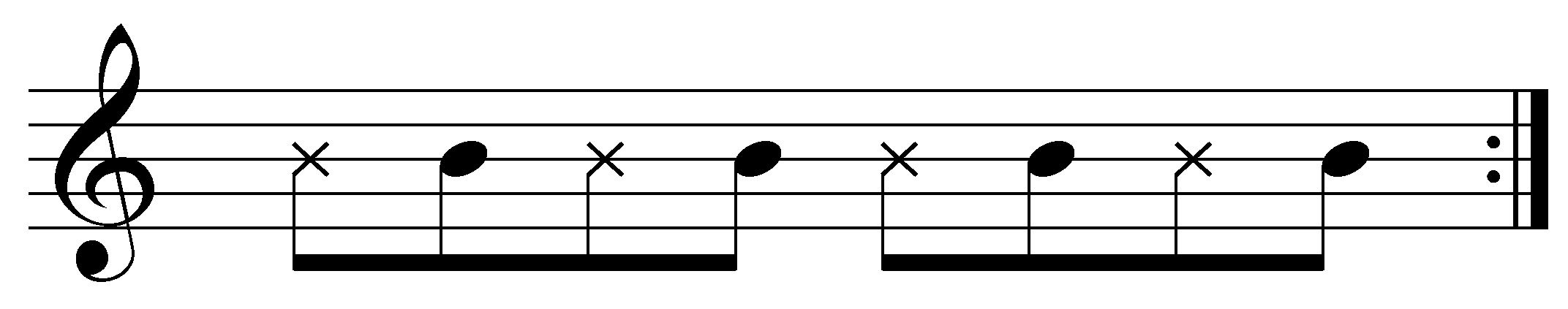
Reggae guitar pattern

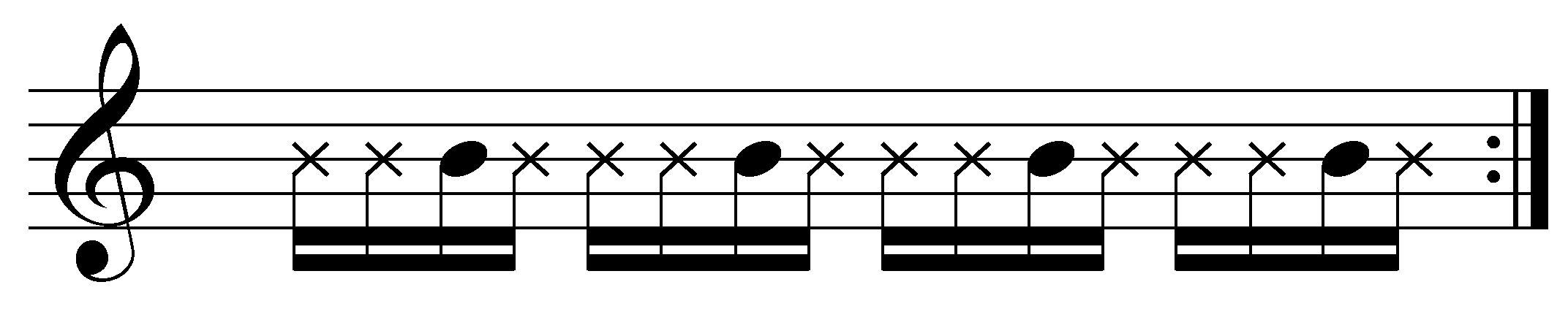
Reggae guitar pattern

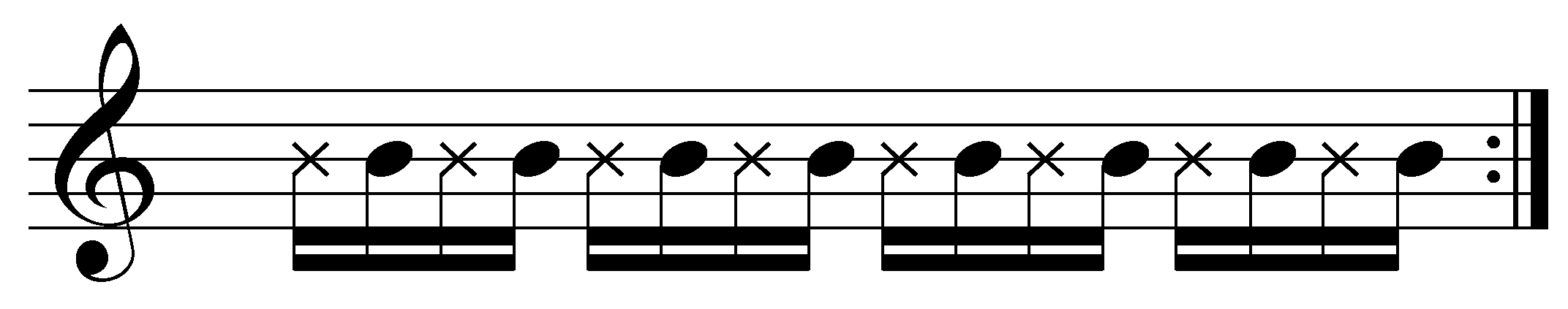
Ska guitar pattern

The ska stroke up or ska upstroke, skank or bang, is a guitar strumming technique that is used mostly in the performance of ska, rocksteady, and reggae music. It is derived from a form of rhythm and blues arrangement called the shuffle, a popular style in Jamaican blues parties of the 1940s, 1950s and 1960s.

== History ==
=== Origin ===
As evidenced by musicologist Bruno Blum in the Jamaica–USA – Roots of Ska – Rhythm and Blues Shuffle 1942–1962 scholar anthology, the shuffle's offbeat/upbeat stroke ("chuck", "skank") was originally played on the piano in U.S. groups like Louis Jordan & His Tympani Five ("It's a Low-Down Dirty Shame", 1942; "G.I. Jive", 1944; "Choo Choo Ch'Boogie", 1946; "Boogie Woogie Blue Plate", 1947), Gene Philips and the Rhythm Aces ("Rock Bottom", 1947), T-Bone Walker ("T-Bone Shuffle", 1947), Gene Coy & His Killer Dillers ("Killer Diller", 1948), Professor Longhair ("Willie Mae", 1949), Fats Domino ("Little Bee", 1950), Rosco Gordon ("No More Doggin", 1952) and B.B. King ("You Upset Me Baby", 1954), all popular records on 1950s Jamaican dancehalls.

=== Early recordings ===
The shuffle's upbeat stroke was played and recorded on the guitar as early as 1950 by U.S. guitar player Robert Kelton with singer-pianist Jimmy McCracklin and his Blues Blasters ("Rockin' All Day"). Jamaican musicians copying this style for the early Jamaican R&B shuffle recordings of the late 1950s played the shuffle either on the guitar and the piano or both, as heard in recordings such by The Duke Reid Group ("The Joker", Duke Reid, 1959), Theophilus Beckford ("Easy Snappin', "Worldisc, 1959), Clue J & His Blues Blasters ("Silky", Coxsone 1960), Count Ossie & the Wareikas ("African Shuffle", Moodies, circa 1960) and on Bob Marley's debut single "Judge Not" (Beverley's, 1962).

=== Development and genres ===
By late 1962, a slight change in Lloyd Knibb's drum rhythm was the landmark for the birth of ska, but the shuffle played on the piano and guitar remained the same. Theophilus Beckford is often credited as the piano player on early Jamaican R&B recordings; Ernest Ranglin and Jerry Hinds as guitar players. The shuffle shifted to ska in 1962, then to rocksteady by 1965 and reggae in 1968. "Reggae is most easily recognized by...the skank."

=== Musical features and impact ===
Ska strokes serve as a rhythmic base to a song, and may be doubled by the drums. This style of playing has a dance associated with it, the skank. In reggae, the guitar usually plays a short, percussive, "scratchy chop sound [chord]", on beats 2 and 4 (1 2 3 4), often supported by staccato piano (late 1960s to the early 1980s) or synthesizer. Ska strokes create a bouncing rhythm, going up then down in pitch. Played in 4/4 time (𝄆1 & 2 & 3 & 4 & 𝄇), the chosen guitar chord is played on the downbeat (indicated by numbers), and then a ghost note is played on the upbeat (indicated by ampersands) by lifting the fretting hand off the fret by a few millimeters. However, most traditional ska is focused on the upbeat; playing on the downbeat is more closely associated with reggae, where the ska strokes are played much more slowly as opposed to ska.

Double-time: ||:1 & 2 & 3 & 4 & :||
Common-time: ||:1 2 3 4 1 2 3 4 :||
Half-time  : ||:1234123412341234:||

== See also ==
- Chop chord
- Mento
- One drop rhythm
