= Bluegrass mandolin =

String instrument

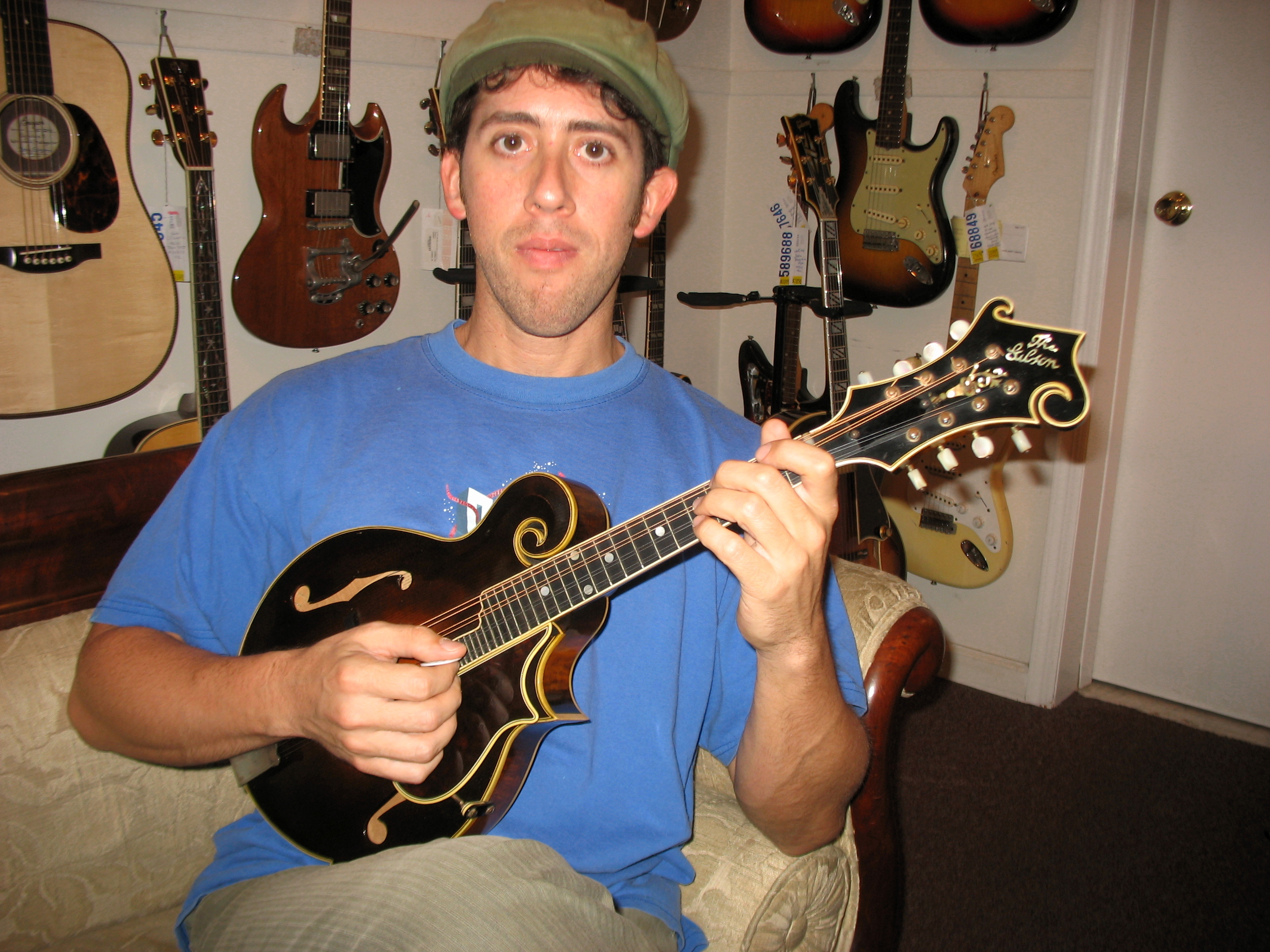
Joseph Brent with a 1924 Gibson F5 Mandolin (one made by Lloyd Loar). The Lloyd Loar mandolins are popular because early Bluegrass musician, Bill Monroe, used one to get his distinctive sound.

Bluegrass mandolin is a style of mandolin playing most commonly heard in bluegrass bands.

== History ==
At the beginning of the twentieth century, mandolin orchestras were popular throughout North America. Large numbers of mandolins were sold, particularly by the Gibson Guitar Company, which manufactured and promoted a new type of flat-backed mandolin. After a time, the mandolin orchestra craze died out, but the mandolins remained. In the southern United States, they began to be used in the performance of traditional mountain folk music.

At the end of the 1930s, a new musical genre which combined Scottish and Irish fiddle tunes, blues and African American banjo with traditional American songs began to develop. Bill Monroe, a Kentucky fiddler and mandolin player, was the first to bring all of the elements of this new genre together. Monroe developed a distinctive style of mandolin playing which emphasized strong syncopation and chording, and played in keys, such as E and B, seldom used by old-time and country musicians. He and his band, the Blue Grass Boys, played at the Grand Ole Opry in late 1939 to popular acclaim, and other bands began to incorporate the new "bluegrass" music into their repertoires. Mandolin players in these bands took elements of Monroe's style and then added their own flavor.

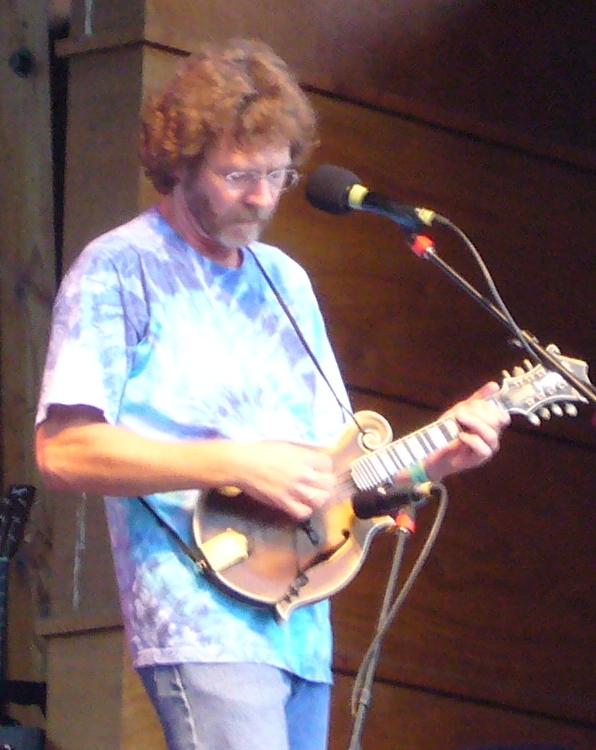
Bluegrass fiddler and mandolinist Sam Bush with a typical f-style mandolin

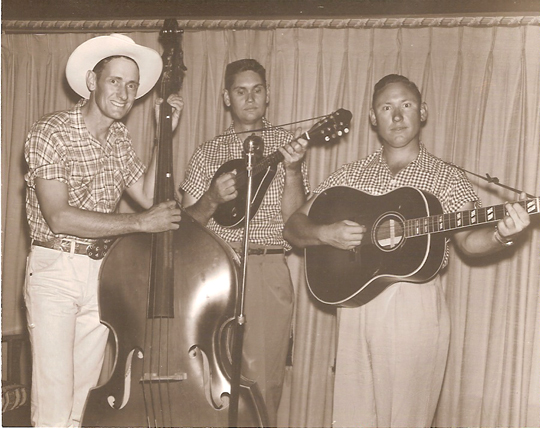
Curtis Davis plays a typical a-style mandolin in his brother's band Olen and the Bluegrass Travelers

== Mandolins used in bluegrass music ==
Mandolins come in many shapes and sizes, but most are not suitable for bluegrass playing. Old traditional mandolins with round backs, for example, are difficult to play in a standing position and are almost never used. Some older mandolins have relatively few frets, limiting the mandolin player's use of high notes.

Most bluegrass mandolin players choose one of two styles. Both have flat or nearly flat backs and arched tops. The so-called a-style mandolin has a teardrop-shaped body; the f-style mandolin is more stylized, with a spiraled wooden cone on the upper side and a couple of points on the lower side. There are also two types of sound holes, the classic round or oval hole, and the more modern pair of f-holes similar to those found on a violin. Both the shape of the instrument and the shape of the holes affect the tone of the instrument; the f-style, f-hole mandolins have the brightest, most penetrating sound, while the a-style, round holed mandolins generally have a fuller, sweeter tone.

== The bluegrass mandolin style ==
The mandolin has been a core instrument in bluegrass music from the beginning, along with guitar, fiddle, banjo, upright bass, and sometimes dobro.

In the performance of bluegrass music, each instrument has a specific part to play. The mandolin fills three roles at different times during a tune.

=== Rhythm ===
It is common that in bluegrass music, each instrument in the band adds to the rhythm of the tune in its own way. The mandolin with its high toned strings, makes its contribution with a technique called a "chop," also known as chunking. Sharp chords are played on the second and fourth beats of each bar (or the second and third in the case of 3/4 time). These are called the "upbeats" or sometimes "offbeats". By releasing the pressure of the fingers shortly after striking each chord, the chops create a driving, percussive effect. This strong offbeat chop is an important part of the bluegrass sound, originated by Bill Monroe. When the mandolinist is otherwise occupied, the chop is sometimes provided by the banjo or fiddle.

=== Fill and backup ===
Bluegrass singing typically includes long-held notes and sometimes pauses for extra "turnaround" notes at the end of lyrical lines. The melody instrument players, including the mandolinist, play simple harmonies, countermelodies or soft chopping in behind the singing, and take turns contributing bold improvisations and "licks" during the pauses and turnarounds.

=== Breaks, kickoffs and endings ===
Bluegrass music is characterized by songs with simple, straightforward verses and choruses, interspersed with showy instrumental improvisations called "breaks", provided by the melody instruments, including the mandolin. A good mandolin break may stick fairly closely to the melody of the tune, or it may be almost all improvisation around the chord progression. In most cases the mandolin player will include elements of the melody, complemented by improvisation and chording. Kickoffs (which lead the band into a tune) and endings are similar to breaks, but are usually shorter.

== Playing techniques ==
A mandolin is tuned like a fiddle, yet constructed more like a guitar, and mandolin players use elements from both in their playing. However, the mandolin's short, tight strings and "woody" tone have allowed its players to develop playing techniques which are unique to this instrument.

=== Chording ===
Because of the need for quick deadening of the strings when chopping, most bluegrass mandolinists make heavy use of chord formations without open strings. This allows a strong penetrating rhythm, and the fingering patterns can be extended up the neck of the mandolin. Some musicians, such as Jethro Burns, prefer three-finger chords. These require more right-hand dexterity because at times the fourth string must be avoided, but because of the simpler left hand fingering they allow faster and more complex chord changes and sliding chord techniques during breaks.

=== Tremolo ===
Tremolo is a technique which is used by mandolin players in many genres. Up-and-down strokes on a single note are played so rapidly that the note has no time to die away. In bluegrass music the tremolo notes are often short and intense, but can be gentle and sweet in the occasional slow-paced tune.

=== Cross picking ===
Cross picking is a flat picking technique which allows the mandolin to emulate the syncopation of the banjo roll or the fiddle shuffle bowing. It creates a cheery, toe-tapping effect.

=== Slides and hammer-ons ===
Much of the bluesy feel of bluegrass instrumentals comes from the creative use of slide and hammer-on techniques and the use of notes from the blues scale.

=== Licks ===
Bluegrass mandolin players over time build up a repertoire of pre-practised passages called "licks" which can be inserted into breaks or turnarounds at appropriate moments during a performance. Many bluegrass tunes are played at a rapid pace, and while a lot of improvisation goes on, including these "fancy bits" make the resulting music more impressive and exciting.

== Instrumental tunes ==
Bluegrass shows its traditional roots most clearly during the instrumental pieces. Many of the traditional bluegrass instrumentals started out as Scottish or Irish fiddle and pipe reels. Others were created to highlight the special syncopated sound of the banjo. During a jam or performance, the melody is passed from instrument to instrument, with the other instruments playing backup roles. Since few of these tunes were originally created with the mandolin in mind, the mandolin player must be creative in improvising around the tune. For this reason, it is rare to hear two mandolin players play a tune in exactly the same way.

== Notable bluegrass mandolinists ==
- Bill Monroe - mandolinist and "The Father of Bluegrass", whose band ("Blue Grass Boys") is the namesake of the musical genre
- Jesse McReynolds - pioneer of the cross-picking style
- Frank Wakefield - innovator of multiple techniques and composer of the mandolin standard "New Camptown Races"
- Ricky Skaggs - Grammy-winning country and bluegrass musician
- David Grisman - creator of the "Dawg music" style, blending bluegrass, jazz, folk, and Old World music
- Sam Bush - leading the Newgrass or Progressive bluegrass style
- Chris Thile - Grammy-winning mandolinist for the bands Nickel Creek and Punch Brothers. Thile was also the host of A Prairie Home Companion, a live recorded radio program hosted by Minnesota Public Radio.
- Mike Marshall
- Tim O'Brien
- Sierra Hull
- Sarah Jarosz
