= Reggae =

Music genre

- Stylistic origins: Mento; nyabinghi; R&B; jazz; ska; rocksteady
- Cultural origins: Late-1960s Jamaica, particularly Kingston
- Derivative forms: Dancehall; dub; new wave; ragga; jungle; drum and bass

Subgenres
- Roots reggae; lovers rock; reggae en Español (complete list)

Fusion genres
- Reggaeton; reggae fusion; seggae; 2 tone; samba reggae; reggaestep; reggae rock; ragga-soca/calypso; kompa/reggae

Regional scenes
- Africa; Australia; Guyana; Japan; Kenya; New Zealand; Nigeria; Panama; Philippines; Poland; Trinidad and Tobago; United Kingdom

Other topics
- Music of Jamaica; list of reggae musicians

Reggae music of Jamaica
- UNESCO Intangible Cultural Heritage
- Country: Jamaica
- Reference: 01398
- Region: Latin America and the Caribbean

Inscription history
- Inscription: 2018 (13th session)
- List: Representative

Reggae (/ˈrɛɡeɪ/) is a music genre that originated in Jamaica in the late 1960s. The term also refers to the modern popular music of Jamaica and its diaspora. The 1968 single by Toots and the Maytals titled "Do the Reggay" was the first popular song to use the word reggae, effectively naming the genre and introducing it to a global audience.

== Origins and influences ==
Reggae developed from earlier Jamaican genres including mento, ska, and rocksteady, and is rooted in traditional drumming styles such as Kumina, Pukkumina, Revival Zion, Nyabinghi, and burru. It incorporates elements of rhythm and blues, jazz, mento (a rural folk form that served as dance music and an alternative to church singing, which was conflated with calypso by the 1950s), and traditional African folk rhythms.

== Musical characteristics ==
Reggae is distinguished by a slower tempo than ska or rocksteady, a strong emphasis on the downbeat in the drum and bass, and short, staccato guitar or piano chords on the offbeat. The bass guitar plays a central role, with a thick, heavy tone and the high frequencies reduced to accentuate the low end. Call-and-response patterns are common, and the rhythm section often uses the bass as a percussion instrument, a feature carried over from rocksteady. Notable rhythm players include Jackie Jackson, Carlton Barrett, Lloyd Brevett, Paul Douglas, Lloyd Knibb, Winston Grennan, Sly Dunbar, and Anthony "Benbow" Creary.

Vocals are often delivered in Jamaican Patois, Jamaican English, or Iyaric. Lyrical themes range from political and social commentary to religion, love, and leisure activities.

== Cultural connections ==
Reggae is closely associated with Rastafari, an Afrocentric religion that emerged in Jamaica in the 1930s promoting pan-Africanism. From the 1970s onwards, its international success helped to spread Rastafarian beliefs, with musicians often seen as cultural messengers and agents of change.

== Global spread ==
Reggae has reached audiences worldwide, often fusing with other genres and incorporating local instruments. In Latin America, reggae en Español originated in Panama before spreading to Venezuela and across South America. In the United Kingdom, Caribbean music, including reggae, has been popular since the late 1960s, spawning several subgenres and fusions, with many reggae artists beginning their careers there. European musicians have also drawn heavily on Jamaican and Caribbean traditions. In Africa, the genre's profile was boosted by the visit of Bob Marley to Zimbabwe in 1980.

== Etymology ==
The 1967 edition of the Dictionary of Jamaican English lists reggae as "a recently estab. sp. for rege", as in rege-rege, a word that can mean either "rags, ragged clothing" or "a quarrel, a row". Reggae as a musical term first appeared in print with the 1968 rocksteady hit "Do the Reggay" by the Maytals which named the genre.

Reggae historian Steve Barrow credits Clancy Eccles with altering the Jamaican patois word streggae (loose woman) into reggae. However, Toots Hibbert said:

There's a word we used to use in Jamaica called "streggae". If a girl is walking and the guys look at her and say "Man, she's streggae" it means she don't dress well, she look raggedy. The girls would say that about the men too. This one morning me and my two friends were playing and I said, "OK man, let's do the reggay." It was just something that came out of my mouth. So we just start singing "Do the reggay, do the reggay" and created a beat. People tell me later that we had given the sound its name. Before that people had called it blue-beat and all kind of other things. Now it's in the Guinness World of Records.

Bob Marley said that the word reggae came from a Spanish term for "the king's music". The liner notes of To the King, a compilation of Christian gospel reggae, suggest that the word reggae was derived from the Latin regi meaning 'to the king'.

== History ==
=== Precursors ===
Reggae's direct origins are in the ska and rocksteady of 1960s Jamaica, strongly influenced by traditional mento (often referred to as calypso music due to conflation), as well as American jazz and rhythm and blues. Ska was originally a generic title for Jamaican music recorded between 1961 and 1967 and emerged from Jamaican R&B, which was based largely on American R&B and doo-wop. Rastafari entered some countries primarily through reggae music; thus, the movement in these places is more stamped by its origins in reggae music and social milieu. The Rastafari movement was a significant influence on reggae, with Rasta drummers like Count Ossie taking part in seminal recordings. One of the predecessors of reggae drumming is the Nyabinghi rhythm, a style of ritual drumming performed as a communal meditative practice in Rastafarian culture.

In the latter half of the 20th century, phonograph records became of central importance to the Jamaican music industry, playing a significant cultural and economic role in the development of reggae music. "In the early 1950s, Jamaican entrepreneurs began issuing 78s" but this format would soon be superseded by the 7" single, first released in 1949. In 1951 the first recordings of mento music were released as singles and showcased two styles of mento: an acoustic rural style, and a jazzy pop style. Other 7" singles to appear in Jamaica around this time were covers of popular American R&B hits, made by Kingston sound system operators to be played at public dances. Meanwhile, Jamaican expatriates started issuing 45s on small independent labels in the United Kingdom, many mastered directly from Jamaican 45s.

Ska arose in Jamaican studios in the late 1950s, developing from this mix of American R&B, and mento. Notable for its jazz-influenced horn riffs, ska is characterized by a quarter note walking bass line, guitar and piano offbeats, and a drum pattern with cross-stick snare and bass drum on the backbeat and open hi-hat on the offbeats. When Jamaica gained independence in 1962, ska became the music of choice for young Jamaicans seeking music that was their own. Ska also became popular among mods in Britain.

In the mid-1960s, ska gave rise to rocksteady, a genre slower than ska featuring more romantic lyrics and less prominent horns. Theories abound as to why Jamaican musicians slowed the ska tempo to create rocksteady; one is that the singer Hopeton Lewis was unable to sing his hit song "Take It Easy" at a ska tempo. The name "rocksteady" was codified after the release of a single by Alton Ellis. Many rocksteady rhythms later were used as the basis of reggae recordings, whose slower tempos allowed for the "double skank" guitar strokes on the offbeat.

=== Emergence in Jamaica ===
Reggae developed from ska and rocksteady in the late 1960s. Larry And Alvin's "Nanny Goat" and the Beltones' "No More Heartaches" were among the songs in the genre. The beat was distinctive from rocksteady in that it dropped any of the pretensions to the smooth, soulful sound that characterized slick American R&B, and instead was closer in kinship to US southern funk, being heavily dependent on the rhythm section to drive it along. From its earliest years, reggae evolved in a variety of stylistic directions, from the raw sound of Lee Perry's "People Funny Boy" to the polished recordings of Third World's "Now That We've Found Love", while retaining its distinctive rhythmic foundation. The shift from rocksteady to reggae was illustrated by the organ shuffle pioneered by Jamaican musicians like Jackie Mittoo and Winston Wright and featured in transitional singles "Say What You're Saying" (1968) by Eric "Monty" Morris and "People Funny Boy" (1968) by Lee "Scratch" Perry.

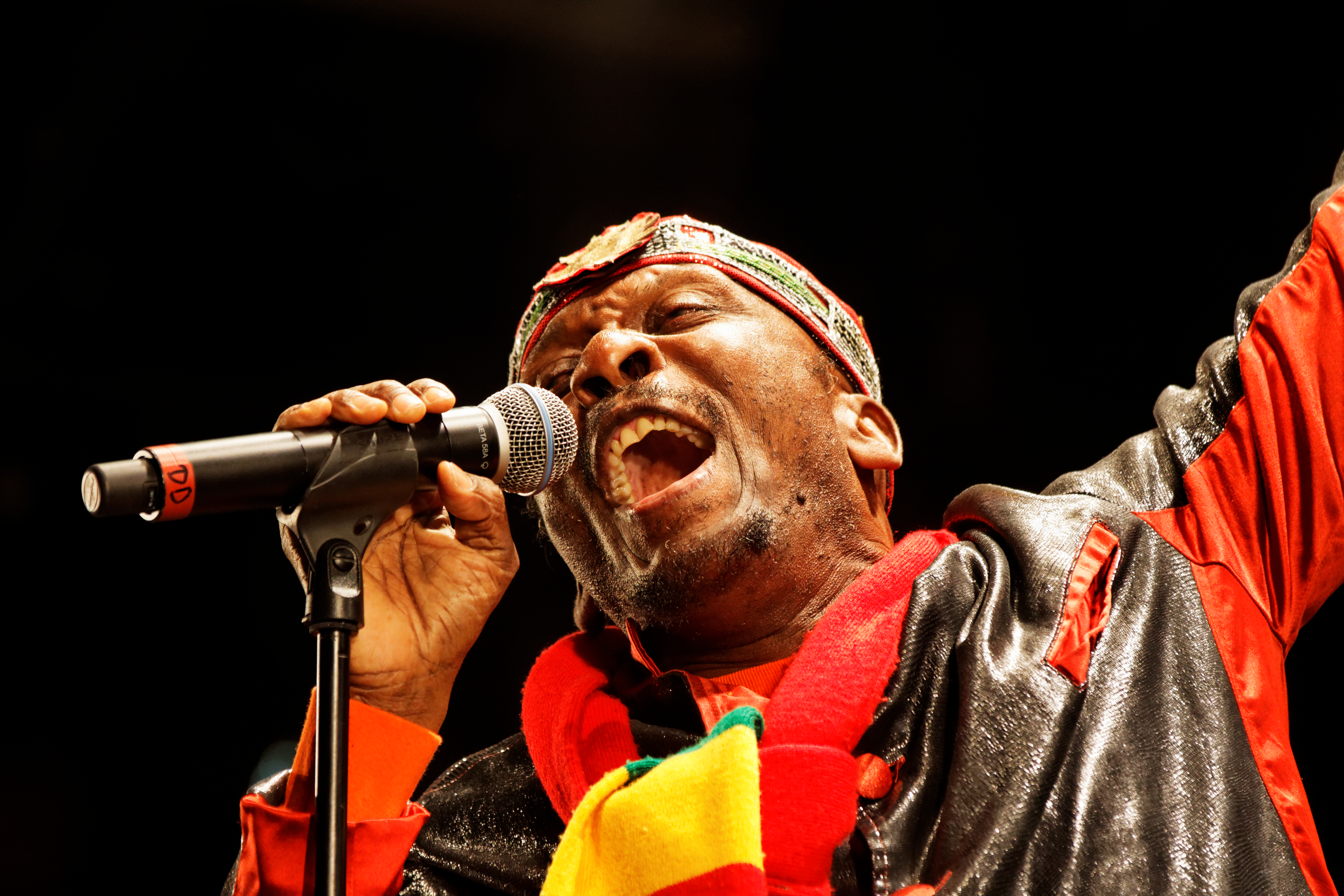
Jimmy Cliff

The emergence of reggae took place amid the growing influence of Rastafari and Black consciousness in Jamaica, contributing to the development of the roots reggae style. Burning Spear recalled that Rastafarian ideas increasingly resonated with people who did not necessarily identify as Rastafarians, and that musicians drew on the movement's emphasis on Africa and culture. He also associated this shift with changes in reggae's rhythmic patterns and the increasing prominence of African and cultural themes in songwriting. Producer Derrick Harriott also recalled that many of the socially conscious recordings that emerged around 1970 reflected the musicians' own experiences of poverty and hardship. He said that performers from Kingston's poorer communities used such songs to express shared experiences and reflect the hardships faced by their audiences. Despite the growing influence of Rastafarian ideas on reggae, openly Rastafarian musicians continued to face discrimination within Jamaica's music industry. Promoters, club owners, and other industry figures were often reluctant to book or employ musicians who wore dreadlocks, limiting employment opportunities for Rastafarian musicians.

Early 1968 was when the first bona fide reggae records were released: "Nanny Goat" by Larry Marshall and "No More Heartaches" by the Beltones. The rapid commercial growth of reggae in the late 1960s was aided by major changes in Jamaica's music industry. Increased retail sales of records led to the expansion of specialist record shops and formal distribution networks, reducing reliance on sound systems as the primary means of circulating music. This shift enabled a new generation of independent producers, such as Bunny Lee and Harry J, to enter the industry without operating their own sound systems or retail shops. With studios available for hourly rental, record production became less expensive and more accessible, contributing to a sharp increase in the volume of recordings and accelerating reggae's spread. During the late 1960s and early 1970s, toasting became an increasingly prominent feature of reggae. Deejays such as U-Roy and Big Youth improvised rhythmic vocals over records on Jamaican sound systems, while the introduction of dubplates and instrumental versions expanded opportunities for live deejay performances. In 1968, the newest Jamaican sound began to spawn big-name imitators in other countries. American artist Johnny Nash's 1968 hit "Hold Me Tight" has been credited with first putting reggae in the American listener charts. Around the same time, reggae influences were starting to surface in rock and pop music; one example is 1968's "Ob-La-Di, Ob-La-Da" by the Beatles.

The Wailers, a band started by Bob Marley, Peter Tosh and Bunny Wailer in 1963, is perhaps the most recognized band that made the transition through all three stages of early Jamaican popular music: ska, rocksteady and reggae. Over a dozen Wailers songs are based on or use a line from Jamaican mento songs. Other significant ska artists who made the leap to reggae include Prince Buster, Desmond Dekker, Ken Boothe, and Millie Small, best known for her 1964 blue-beat/ska cover version of "My Boy Lollipop" which was a smash hit internationally.

Notable Jamaican producers influential in the development of ska into rocksteady and reggae include: Coxsone Dodd, Lee "Scratch" Perry, Leslie Kong, Duke Reid, Joe Gibbs and King Tubby. Reggae's early growth in the United Kingdom was initially driven by the country's Jamaican immigrant community, with records distributed through small import businesses and specialist shops before the music achieved mainstream commercial success. Chris Blackwell, who founded Island Records in Jamaica in 1960, relocated to England in 1962, where he continued to promote Jamaican music. He formed a partnership with Lee Gopthal's Trojan Records in 1968, which released reggae in the UK until bought by Saga records in 1974.

Many reggae recordings released in Britain during the late 1960s and early 1970s were remixed, remastered, or overdubbed with additional orchestration by British licensees in an effort to make them more commercially accessible to mainstream pop audiences. According to Lloyd Bradley, Jamaican artists often commented that their British releases sounded substantially different from the original Jamaican recordings.

=== International popularity ===
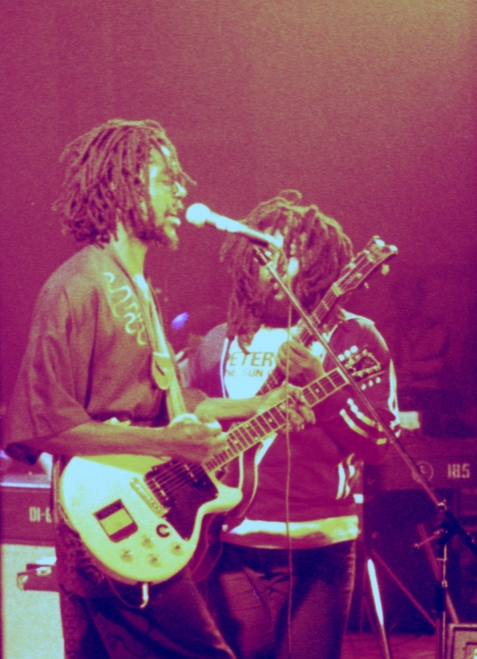
Peter Tosh with Robbie Shakespeare, 1978

Between 1968 and 1972, reggae sales in the United Kingdom exceeded those in Jamaica. During 1970 alone, Trojan/B&C released approximately 500 singles across more than thirty labels, with sales exceeding two million copies.

Reggae reached the top of the U.S. Billboard Hot 100 charts in late 1972. First, Three Dog Night hit No. 1 in September with a cover of the Maytones' version of "Black and White". Then, Johnny Nash was at No. 1 for four weeks in November with "I Can See Clearly Now". Paul Simon's single "Mother And Child Reunion" – a track which he recorded in Kingston, Jamaica with Jimmy Cliff's backing group – was ranked by Billboard as the No. 57 song of 1972.

In 1972, the film The Harder They Come, starring Jimmy Cliff, introduced Jamaican music to cinema audiences outside Jamaica. The film first found success among Jamaican and Jamaican-influenced communities before achieving cult status among wider audiences. Its soundtrack remained the best-selling reggae album until the release of Bob Marley's Legend in 1984 and has been described as having "brought reggae to the world". Reggae's international profile was further boosted by Eric Clapton's 1974 cover of Bob Marley's "I Shot the Sheriff", which used modern rock production and recording techniques while retaining most of the original's reggae elements. The recording played an important part in introducing reggae and Marley's songwriting to a wider rock audience. By the mid-1970s, authentic reggae dub plates and specials were getting some exposure in the UK on John Peel's radio show, who promoted the genre for the rest of his career. Around the same time, British filmmaker Jeremy Marre documented the Jamaican music scene in Roots Rock Reggae, capturing the heyday of Roots reggae.

Despite reggae's commercial success overseas, many Jamaican artists saw little financial benefit from international sales. According to music historian Lloyd Bradley, proceeds from overseas sales often remained with British record companies and Jamaican producers, leaving many artists with earnings only from Jamaican sales.

The 1970s oil crisis affected Jamaican vinyl production, contributing to a general decline in pressing quality and poor fidelity on some releases. In the late 1970s and early 1980s, the UK punk rock scene flourished, and reggae was a notable influence. The DJ Don Letts would play reggae and punk tracks at clubs such as The Roxy. Punk bands such as the Clash, the Ruts, the Members, the Police and the Slits played many reggae-influenced songs. Around the same time, reggae music took a new path in the UK; one that was created by the multiracial makeup of England's inner cities and exemplified by groups like Steel Pulse, Aswad and UB40, as well as artists such as Smiley Culture and Carroll Thompson. The Jamaican ghetto themes in the lyrics were replaced with UK inner city themes, and Jamaican patois became intermingled with Cockney slang. In South London around this time, a new subgenre of lovers rock, was being created. Unlike the Jamaican music of the same name which was mainly dominated by male artists such as Gregory Isaacs, the South London genre was led by female singers like Thompson and Janet Kay. The UK Lovers Rock had a softer and more commercial sound. Other reggae artists who enjoyed international appeal in the early 1980s include Third World, Black Uhuru and Sugar Minott. The Grammy Awards introduced the Grammy Award for Best Reggae Album category in 1985.

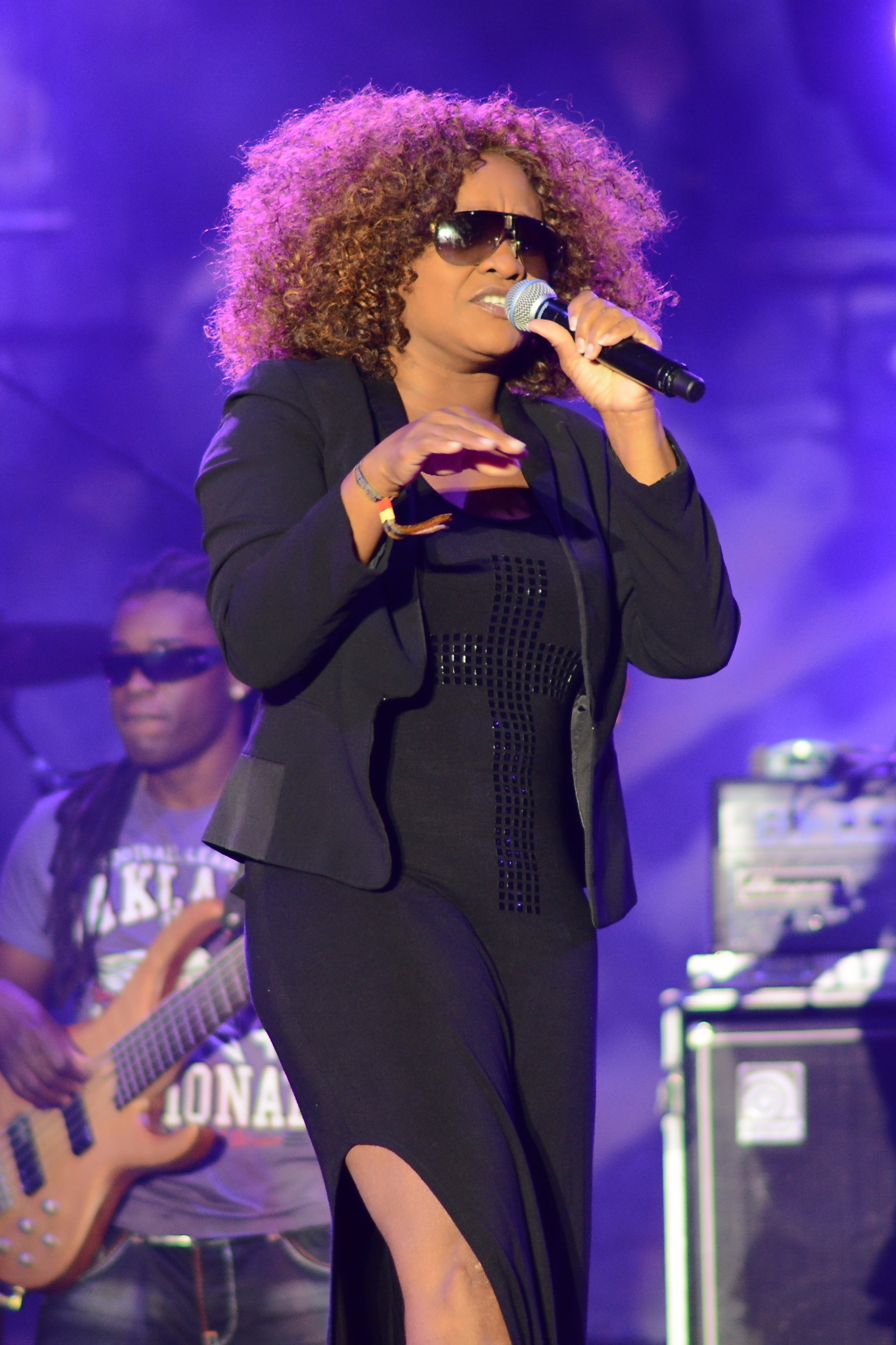
Tanya Stephens in 2014 at a German Reggae festival

Women also play a role in the reggae music industry personnel such as Olivia Grange, president of Specs-Shang Musik; Trish Farrell, president of Island/Jamaica; Lisa Cortes, president of Loose Cannon; Jamaican-American Sharon Gordon, who has worked in the independent reggae music industry.

=== Reggae heritage ===
Jamaican Prime Minister Bruce Golding made February 2008 the first annual Reggae Month in Jamaica. To celebrate, the Recording Industry Association of Jamaica (RIAJam) held its first Reggae Academy Awards on 24 February 2008. In addition, Reggae Month included a six-day Global Reggae conference, a reggae film festival, two radio station award functions, and a concert tribute to the late Dennis Brown, who Bob Marley cited as his favorite singer. On the business side, RIAJam held events focused on reggae's employment opportunities and potential international revenue. . Reggae Month 2019 in Jamaica was welcomed with multiple events ranging from corporate reggae functions to major celebrations in honour of Bob Marley's Birthday on 6 February to a tribute concert in honour of Dennis Brown on 24 February along with a sold-out concert by 2019 Reggae Grammy nominated artiste Protoje for his A Matter of Time Live held at Hope Gardens in Kingston on 23 February.

In November 2018 "reggae music of Jamaica" was added to the UNESCO's Representative List of the Intangible Cultural Heritage of Humanity the decision recognised reggae's "contribution to international discourse on issues of injustice, resistance, love and humanity underscores the dynamics of the element as being at once cerebral, socio-political, sensual and spiritual."

==== Cod reggae ====
The term cod reggae is popularly used to describe reggae done by non-Caribbean people, often in a disparaging manner because of perceived inauthenticity. Boy George has been described as "one of the great cod reggae artists of all time."

== Musical characteristics ==
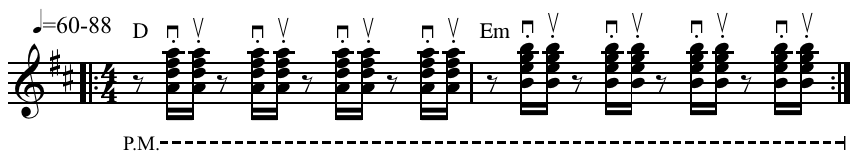
Skank guitar rhythm often considered "'the' reggae beat" or.

Stylistically, reggae incorporates some of the musical elements of rhythm and blues (R&B), jazz, mento, African, and Latin American music, as well as other genres. Reggae scenes consist of two guitars, one for rhythm and one for lead—drums, congas, and keyboards, with a couple of vocalists.

Reggae is played in 4/4 time; its repeating patterns of alternating stronger and weaker beats do not lend themselves to other time signatures such as 3/4. One of the most easily recognizable elements is offbeat rhythms; staccato chords played by a guitar or piano (or both) on the offbeats of the measure, often referred to as the skank.

This rhythmic pattern accents the second and fourth beats in each bar and combines with the drum's emphasis on beat three to create a unique sense of phrasing. The reggae offbeat can be counted so that it falls between each count as an "and" (example: 1 and 2 and 3 and 4 and ... , etc.) or counted as a half-time feel at twice the tempo so it falls on beats 2 and 4. This is in contrast to the way most other popular genres focus on beat one, the "downbeat".

The tempo of reggae is usually slower than ska or rocksteady. The slower tempo, the guitar/piano offbeats, the emphasis on the third beat, and the use of syncopated, melodic bass lines differentiate reggae from other music, although other musical styles have incorporated some of these innovations.

=== Drums and other percussion ===
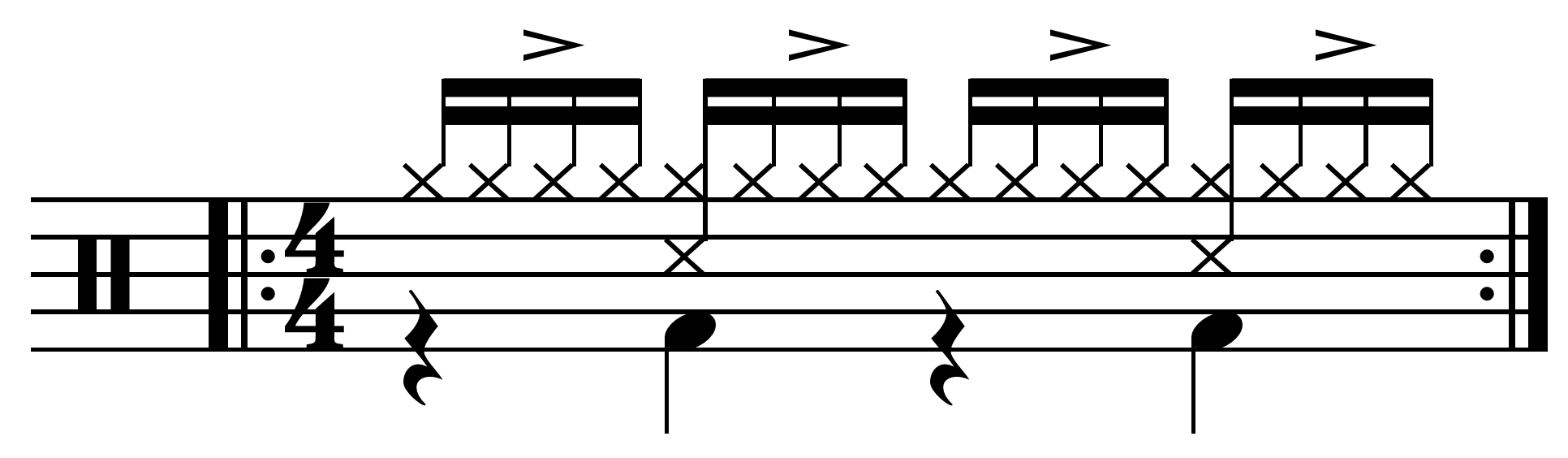
"One drop" sixteenth-note drum pattern

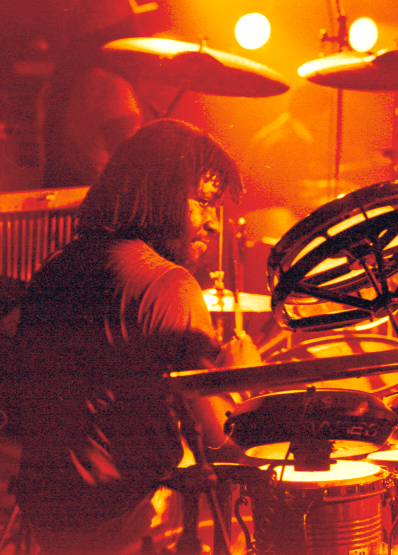
Sly Dunbar

Reggae drummers often involved these three tips for other reggae performers: (1) go for open, ringing tones when playing ska and rocksteady, (2) use any available material to stuff the bass drum so that it tightens up the kick to a deep, punchy thud, and (3) go without a ride cymbal, focusing on the hi-hat for timekeeping and thin crashes with fast decay for accents.

=== Bass ===
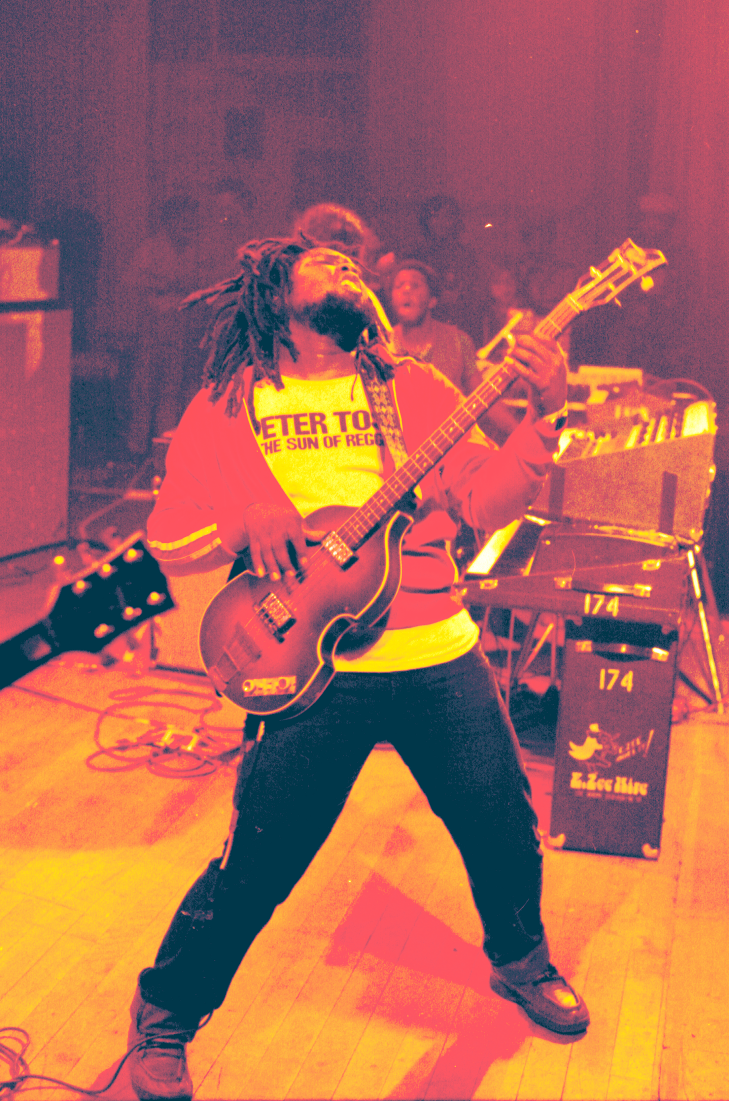
Robbie Shakespeare in 1978

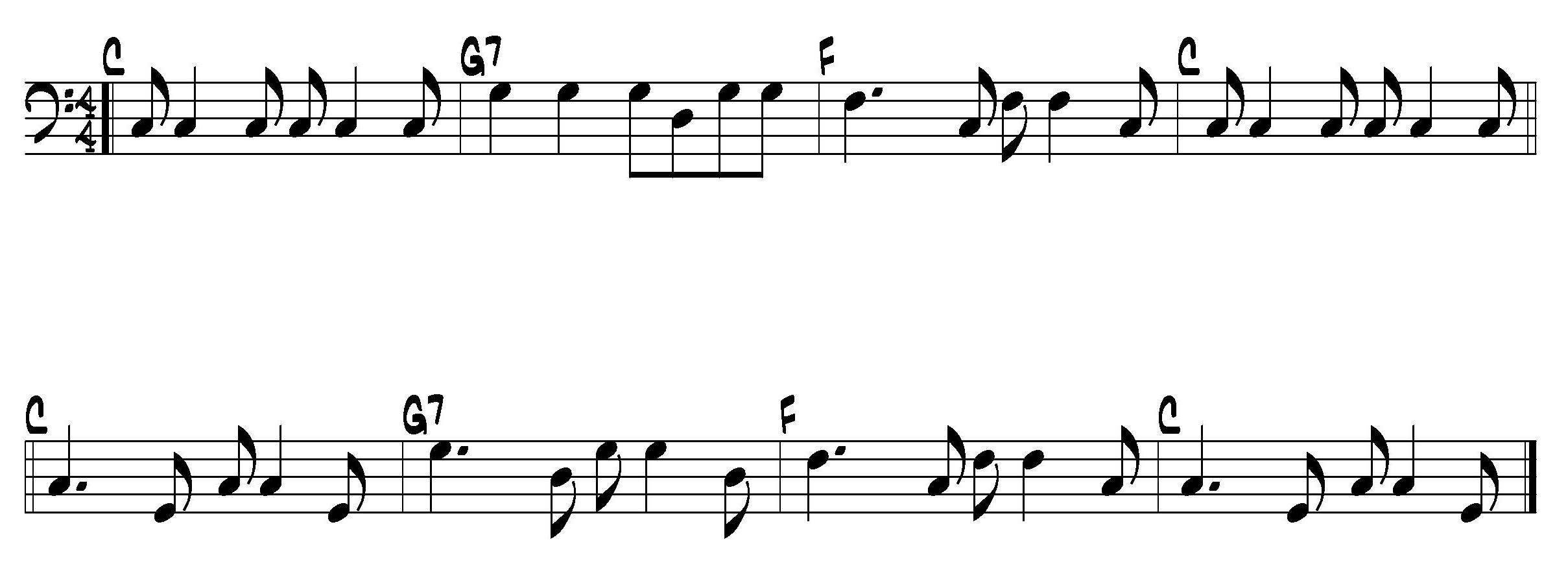
In this typical reggae bass line, the roots of the chords are emphasized, with musical interest created by going from the root down to the fifth of the chord. A dotted quarter note and eighth note rhythm is used repeatedly.

=== Guitars ===
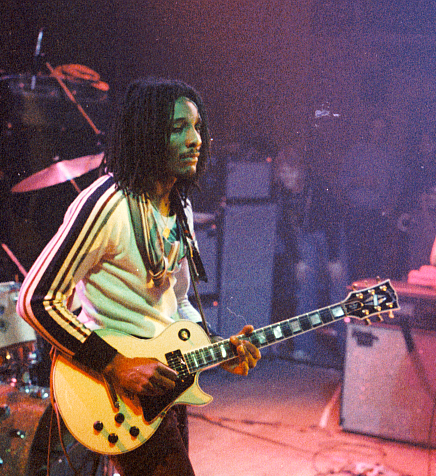
Al Anderson

In reggae, the guitar typically emphasizes the offbeat, playing short, staccato chords between the main beats of the bar in 4/4 time. A musical figure known as skank or the 'bang" has a very dampened, short and scratchy chop sound, almost like a percussion instrument. Sometimes a double chop is used when the guitar still plays the off beats, but also plays the following eighth-note beats on the up-stroke. An example is the intro to "Stir It Up" by the Wailers. Artist and producer Derrick Harriott says, "What happened was the musical thing was real widespread, but only among a certain sort of people. It was always a down-town thing, but more than just hearing the music. The equipment was so powerful and the vibe so strong that we feel it."

=== Keyboards ===
The reggae organ-shuffle is unique to reggae. In the original version of reggae, the drummer played a reggae groove that was used in the four bar introduction, allowing the piano to serve as a percussion instrument.

=== Horns ===
The three-piece horn section, consisting of trumpet, trombone, and saxophone, creates harmonies that are distinctive of reggae music. Dub horn sections found with artists like John Brown's Body create a soundscape that is unmistakable.

=== Vocals ===
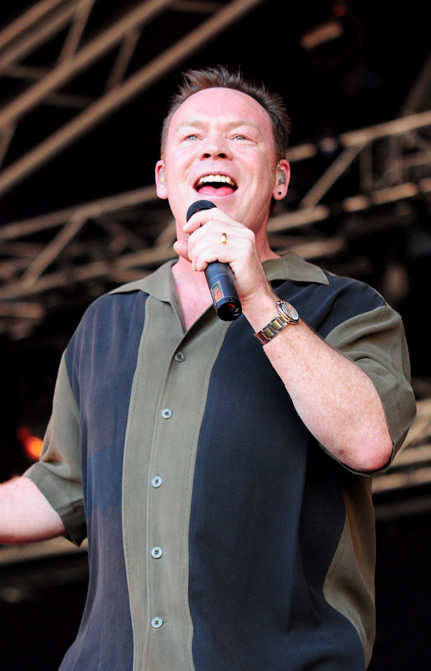
UB40's former frontman Ali Campbell performing in 2009

==== Lyrical themes ====
Reggae is noted for its tradition of social criticism in its lyrics, although many reggae songs discuss lighter, more personal subjects, such as love and socializing. Many early reggae bands covered Motown or Atlantic soul and funk songs. Some reggae lyrics attempt to raise the political consciousness of the audience, such as by criticizing materialism, or by informing the listener about controversial subjects such as apartheid. Many reggae songs promote the use of cannabis (also known as herb, ganja, or sinsemilla), considered a sacrament in the Rastafari movement. There are many artists who utilize religious themes in their music – whether it be discussing a specific religious topic, or simply giving praise to God (Jah). Other common socio-political topics in reggae songs include black nationalism, anti-racism, anti-colonialism, anti-capitalism and criticism of political systems and "Babylon".

In recent years, Jamaican (and non-Jamaican) reggae musicians have used more positive themes in reggae music. The music is widely considered a treasured cultural export for Jamaica, so musicians who still desire progress for their island nation have begun focusing on themes of hopefulness, faith, and love. For elementary children, reggae songs such as "Give a Little Love", "One Love", or "Three Little Birds", all written by Bob Marley, can be sung and enjoyed for their optimism and cheerful lyrics.

==== Criticism of dancehall and reggae lyrics ====
Some dancehall and ragga artists have been criticised for homophobia, including threats of violence. Buju Banton's song "Boom Bye-Bye" states that gays "haffi dead" (have to die). Other notable dancehall artists who have been accused of homophobia include Elephant Man, Bounty Killer and Beenie Man. The controversy surrounding anti-gay lyrics has led to the cancellation of UK tours by Beenie Man and Sizzla. Toronto, Canada has also seen the cancellation of concerts due to artists such as Elephant Man and Sizzla refusing to conform to similar censorship pressures.

After lobbying from the Stop Murder Music coalition, the dancehall music industry agreed in 2005 to stop releasing songs that promote hatred and violence against gay people. In June 2007, Beenie Man, Sizzla and Capleton signed up to the Reggae Compassionate Act, in a deal brokered with top dancehall promoters and Stop Murder Music activists. They renounced homophobia and agreed to "not make statements or perform songs that incite hatred or violence against anyone from any community". Five artists targeted by the anti-homophobia campaign did not sign up to the act, including Elephant Man, TOK, Bounty Killa and Vybz Kartel. Buju Banton and Beenie Man both gained positive press coverage around the world for publicly renouncing homophobia by signing the Reggae Compassion Act. However, both of these artists have since denied any involvement in anti-homophobia work and both deny having signed any such act.

== Global significance ==
Reggae has spread to many countries around the world, often incorporating local instruments and fusing with other genres. In November 2018 UNESCO added the "reggae music of Jamaica" to the Representative List of the Intangible Cultural Heritage of Humanity.

=== Americas ===
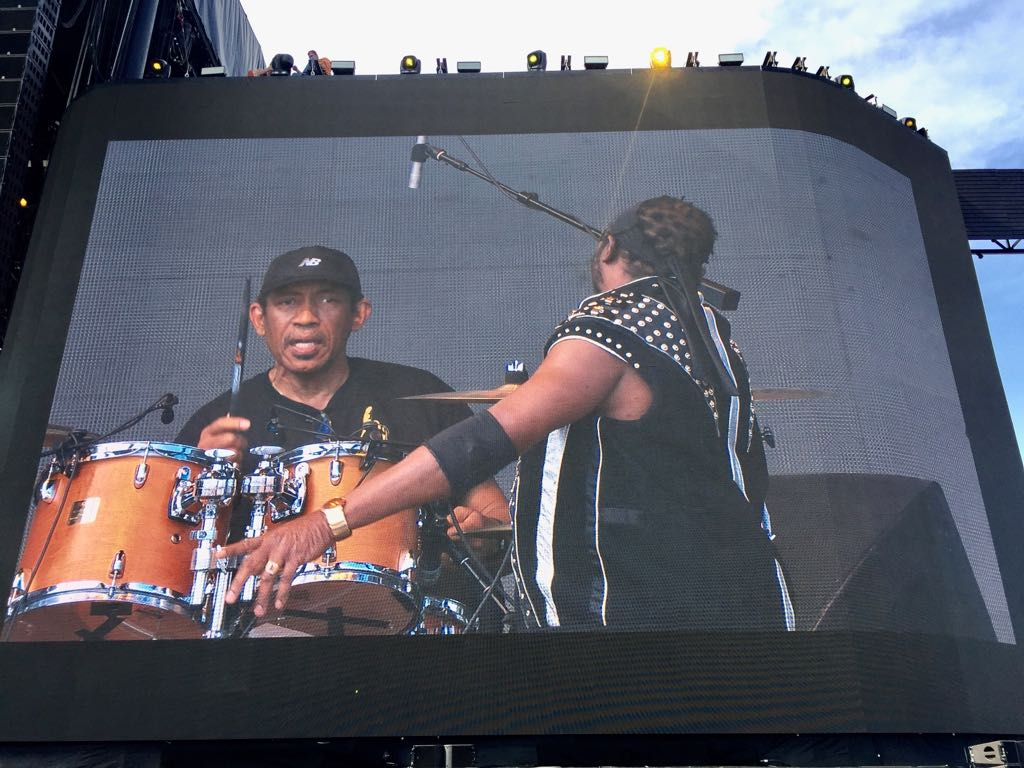
Toots and the Maytals performing at the 2017 Coachella festival

Reggae en Español spread from mainland South American Caribbean from Venezuela and Guyana to the rest of South America. It does not have any specific characteristics other than being sung in Spanish, usually by artists of Latin American origin. Samba reggae originated in Brazil as a blend of samba with Jamaican reggae. Reggae also has a presence in Veracruz, Mexico. The most notable Jarocho reggae group being Los Aguas Aguas from Xalapa. Some of the most popular reggae groups across Latin America come from the Southern Cone, such as the Chilean band Gondwana, and the Argentinian band Los Cafres. The Puerto Rican band Cultura Profética is also widely recognized in the region. Hispanic reggae includes three elements: the incorporation of the Spanish language; the use of translations and versions based on known riddims and background music; and regional consciousness. It is a medium of rebellious contestation rising from the underground. Hispanic reggae is related to rap, sharing characteristics that can be found not only in the social conditions in which they developed in the region but also in the characteristics of social sectors and classes that welcome them.

Brazilian samba-reggae utilized themes such as the civil rights movement and the Black Soul movement, and especially the Jamaican independence movement since the 1960s and its messages in reggae and Rastafari. Thus, the sudden popularity of reggae music and musicians in Bahia, Brazil, was not the result of the effects of the transnational music industry, but of the need to establish cultural and political links with black communities across the Americas that had faced and were facing similar sociopolitical situations.

Musically, it was the bloco afro Olodum and its lead percussionist, Neguinho do Samba, that began to combine the basic samba beat of the blocos with merengue, salsa, and reggae rhythms and debuted their experimentations in the carnival of 1986. The new toques (drumming patterns) were labeled "samba-reggae" and consisted basically of a pattern in which the surdo bass drums (four of them at minimum) divided themselves into four or five interlocking parts.

In the state of Maranhão, in northeastern Brazil, reggae is a very popular genre. São Luís, the state capital, is known as the Brazilian Jamaica. The city has more than 200 radiolas, the name given to sound teams formed by DJs and sound systems with dozens of powerful amplifiers stacked. Reggae in Maranhão has its own characteristics, such as melody and dance style, as well as having its own radio and television programs. In 2018, the Reggae Museum of Maranhão was inaugurated, the second reggae museum in the world (after Jamaica), with the objective of preserving the state's reggae cultural history.

In the United States, bands like Stick Figure, Rebelution, Slightly Stoopid, Dirty Heads, and Iration are the leading bands in a growing genre. Other bands like The Movement, The Elovaters, Artikal Sound

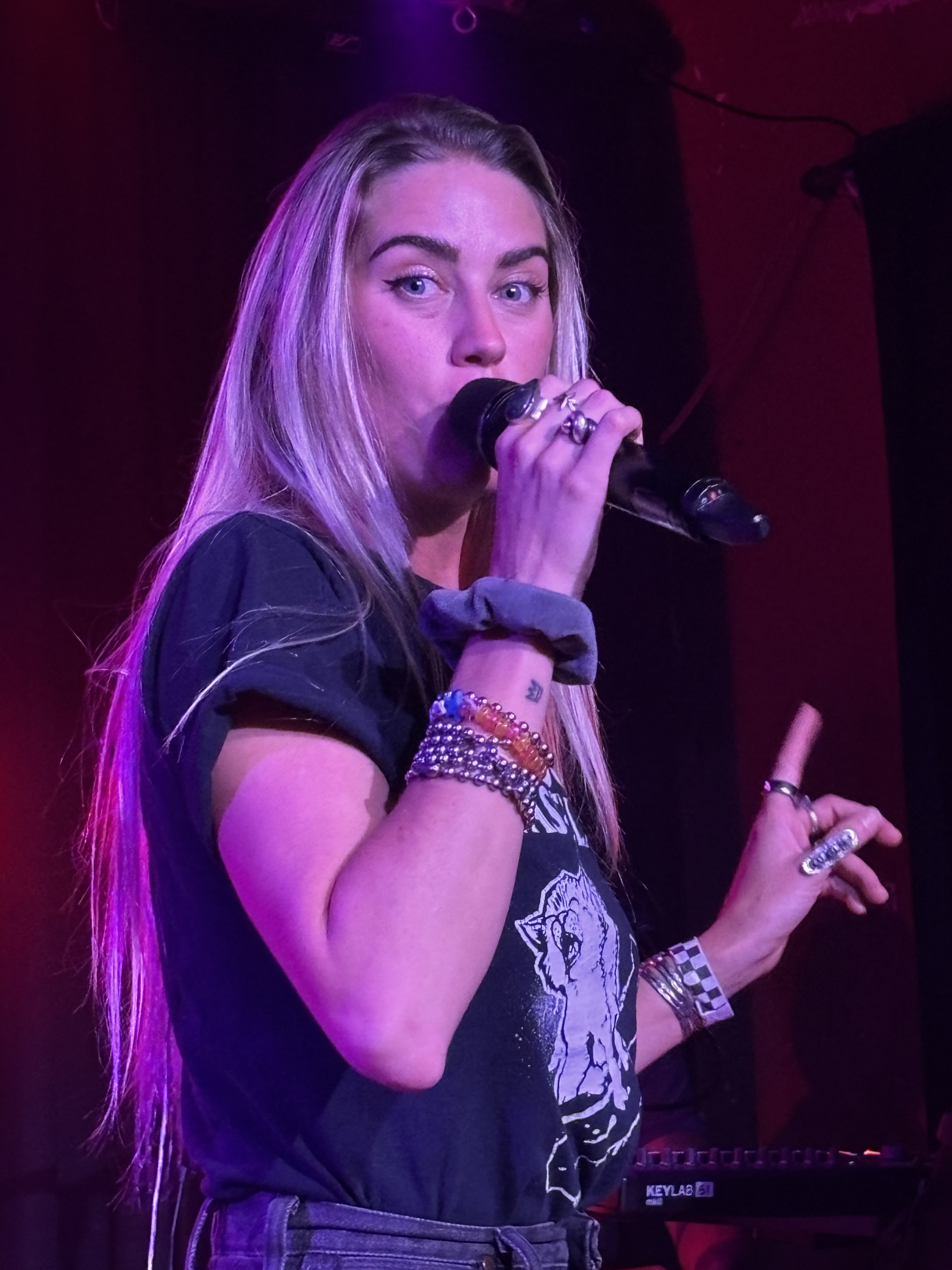
Logan Rex of Artikal Sound System performs at a reggae show. The band is part of a burgeoning movement of newer American Reggae bands that has been growing over the past decade.

The American reggae scene is heavily centred in Southern California, with large scenes also in New York City, Washington, D.C., Chicago, Miami, and Honolulu. For decades, Hawaiian reggae has had a big following on the Hawaiian islands and the West coast of the US. On the east coast upstate NY has seen a rise in original roots reggae bands such as Giant Panda Guerilla Dub Squad and John Brown's Body who were inspired by Jamaican reggae bands that performed in the area in the 1980s and 1990s. Matisyahu gained prominence by blending traditional Jewish themes with reggae. Compounding his use of the hazzan style, Matisyahu's lyrics are mostly English with more than occasional use of Hebrew and Yiddish. There is a large Caribbean presence in Toronto and Montreal, Canada, with English and French influences on the reggae genre. Canadian band Magic!'s 2013 single "Rude" was an international hit.

In 2017, Toots and the Maytals became the second reggae-based group ever to perform at the Coachella festival, after Chronixx in 2016.

=== Europe ===
The UK was a primary destination for Caribbean people looking to emigrate as early as the 1950s. Because of this, Caribbean music in the United Kingdom, including reggae, has been popular since the late 1960s, and has evolved into several subgenres and fusions. Most notable of these is lovers rock, but this fusion of Jamaican music into English culture was seminal in the formation of other musical forms like drum and bass and dubstep. The UK became the base from which many Jamaican artists toured Europe and due to the large number of Jamaican musicians emigrating there, the UK is the root of the larger European scene that exists today. Many of the world's most famous reggae artists began their careers in UK. Singer and Grammy Award-winning reggae artist Maxi Priest began his career with seminal British sound system Saxon Studio International.

Three reggae-tinged singles from the Police's 1978 debut album, Outlandos d'Amour, laid down the template for the basic structure of a lot of rock/reggae songwriting: a reggae-infused verse containing upstrokes on guitar or keyboards and a more aggressive, on-the-beat punk/rock attack during the chorus. The end of the 1970s featured a ska revival in the UK. By the end of the 1970s, a revival movement had begun in England, with such bands as the Specials, Madness, the (English) Beat, and the Selecter. The Specials' leader and keyboardist, Jerry Dammers, founded the 2 Tone record label, which released albums from the aforementioned racially integrated groups and was instrumental in creating a new social and cultural awareness. The 2 Tone movement referenced reggae's godfathers, popular styles (including the genre's faster and more dance-oriented precursors, ska and rocksteady), and previous modes of dress (such as black suits and porkpie hats) but updated the sound with a faster tempo, more guitar, and more attitude.

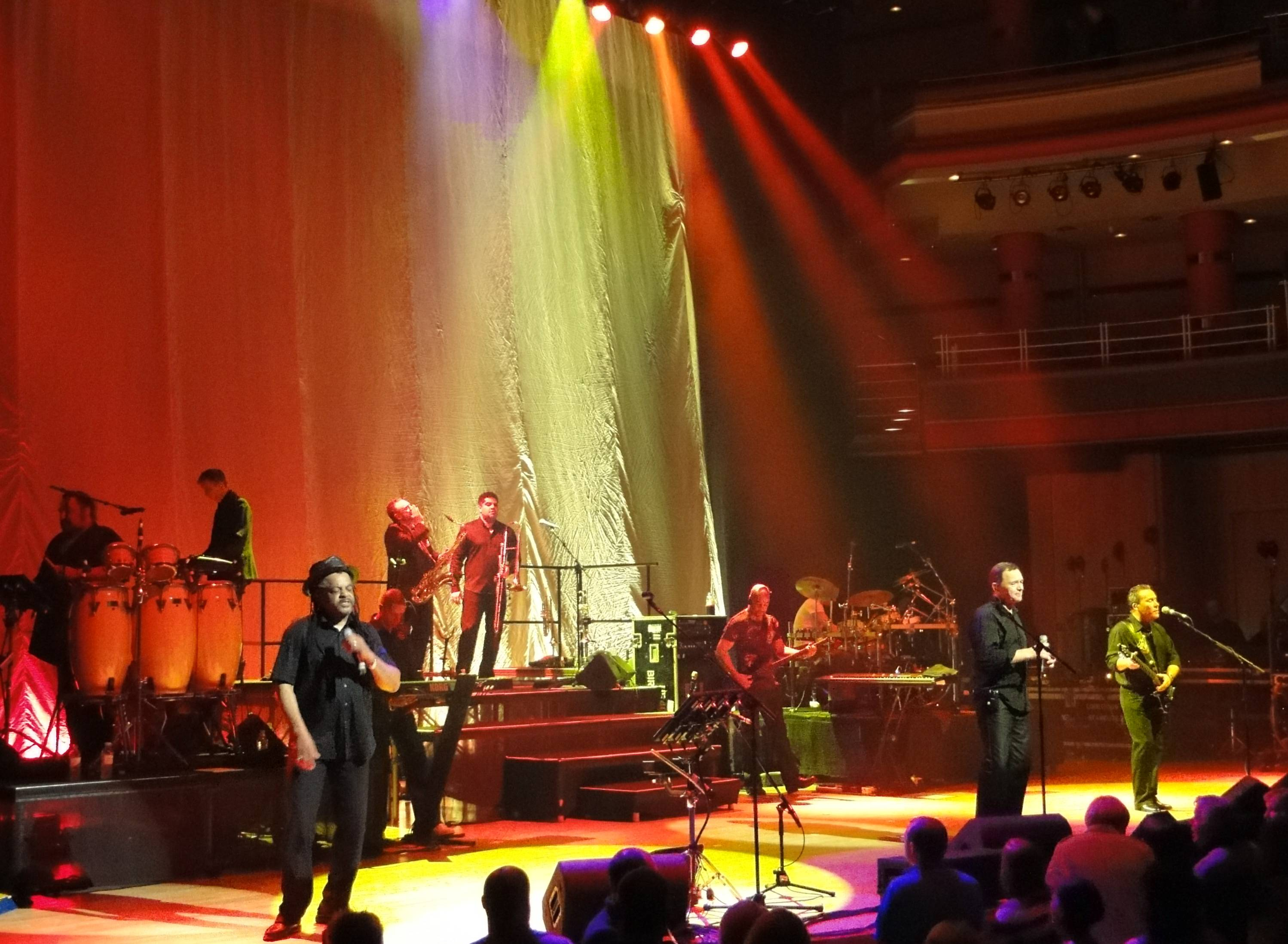
UB40 perform in Birmingham, 2010.

Birmingham based reggae/pop music band UB40 were main contributors to the British reggae scene throughout the 1980s and 1990s. The achieved international success with hits such as "Red Red Wine", "Kingston Town" and "(I Can't Help) Falling in Love with You."

Other UK-based artists that had international impact include Aswad, Misty in Roots, Steel Pulse, Janet Kay, Tippa Irie, Smiley Culture and more recently Bitty McLean. There have been a number of European artists and bands drawing their inspiration directly from Jamaica and the Caribbean community in Europe, whose music and vocal styles are almost identical to contemporary Jamaican music. The best examples might be Alborosie (Italy) and Gentleman (Germany). Both Gentleman and Alborosie have had a significant chart impact in Jamaica, unlike many European artists. They have both recorded and released music in Jamaica for Jamaican labels and producers and are popular artists, likely to appear on many riddims. Alborosie has lived in Jamaica since the late 1990s and has recorded at Bob Marley's famous Tuff Gong Studios. Since the early 1990s, several Italian reggae bands have emerged, including Africa Unite, Gaudi, Reggae National Tickets, Sud Sound System, Pitura Freska and B.R. Stylers.

Reggae appeared on the Yugoslav popular music scene in the late 1970s, through sporadic songs by various rock acts, most prominently by new wave bands Haustor, Šarlo Akrobata, Aerodrom, Laboratorija Zvuka, Piloti, Zana, Du Du A and Grupa I. In the mid-1980s appeared Del Arno Band, often considered the first Yugoslav band whose sound was primarily reggae-oriented, remaining one of the most notable reggae acts in the region of former Yugoslavia.

The first homegrown Polish reggae bands started in the 1980s with groups like Izrael. Singer and songwriter Alexander Barykin was considered the father of Russian reggae. In Sweden, Uppsala Reggae Festival attracts attendees from across Northern Europe and features Swedish reggae bands such as Rootvälta and Svenska Akademien as well as many popular Jamaican artists. Summerjam, Europe's biggest reggae festival, takes place in Cologne, Germany, and sees crowds of 25,000 or more. Rototom Sunsplash, a week-long festival which used to take place in Osoppo, Italy, until 2009, is now held in Benicassim, Spain, and gathers up to 150,000 visitors every year.

In Iceland reggae band Hjálmar is well established having released six CDs in Iceland. They were the first reggae band in Iceland, but few Icelandic artists had written songs in the reggae style before their arrival on the Icelandic music scene. The Icelandic reggae scene is expanding and growing at a fast rate. RVK Soundsystem is the first Icelandic sound system, counting five DJs. They hold reggae nights in Reykjavík every month at clubs Hemmi og Valdi and more recently in Faktorý as the crowd has grown so much.

In Germany, the three successful Reggae Summerjam open-air festivals were crucial parts of the renaissance of Caribbean music in Germany but in 1990, conflict broke out between the two main German promoters who had cooperated so well during the previous seasons. With a lot of infighting and personal quarrels, each of them pursued his own preparations for a big summer festival. The result was that two open-air events look place on the same day.

The 1990 Reggae Summerjam was staged as usual, but for only one day. The event took place at the Lorelei Rock amphitheater, with artists like Mad Professor's Ariwa Posse with Macka B and Kofi, Mutabaruka, the Mighty Diamonds, the Twinkle Brothers, Manu Dibango and Fela Kuti.

The other, ex-partner of the once-united promoters succeeded in bringing the original Sunsplash package to Germany for the first time. Close to the Main River in the little village of Gemaunden deep in rural south-central Germany, they staged a two-day festival that drew a bigger crowd. About 10,000 people came from all over the country as well as from neighboring states like France and, for the first time, East Germany to see the lineup of top reggae artists.

=== Africa ===
Reggae in Africa was much boosted by the visit of Bob Marley to Zimbabwe on Independence Day 18 April 1980. Nigerian reggae had developed in the 1970s with artists such as Majek Fashek proving popular. In South Africa, reggae music has played a unifying role amongst cultural groups in Cape Town. During the years of Apartheid, the music bonded people from all demographic groups. Lucky Dube recorded 25 albums, fusing reggae with Mbaqanga. The Marcus Garvey Rasta camp in Phillipi is regarded by many to be the reggae and Rastafari center of Cape Town. Reggae bands play regularly at community centres such as the Zolani center in Nyanga.

In Uganda musician Papa Cidy is very popular. Arthur Lutta is also a Ugandan gospel reggae drummer known for his reggae style drumming. In Ethiopia, Dub Colossus and Invisible System emerged in 2008 sharing core members, and have received wide acclaim. In Mali, Askia Modibo fuses reggae with Malian music. In Malawi, Black Missionaries produced nine albums. In Ivory Coast a country where reggae music is extremely popular, Tiken Jah Fakoly fuses reggae with traditional music. Alpha Blondy from Ivory Coast sings reggae with religious lyrics. In Sudan, beats, drums and bass guitar from reggae have been adopted by local music. Reggae is very popular there among generations from young to old; some spiritual (religious) groups grow dreadlocks and feature reggae beats in their chants.

=== Asia ===
In the Philippines, several bands and sound systems play reggae and dancehall music. Their music is called Pinoy reggae. Japanese reggae emerged in the early 1980s. Reggae is becoming more prevalent in Thailand as well. Reggae music is quite popular in Sri Lanka. Aside from the reggae music and Rastafari influences seen ever more on Thailand's islands and beaches, a true reggae sub-culture is taking root in Thailand's cities and towns. Many Thai artists, such as Job 2 Do, keep the tradition of reggae music and ideals alive in Thailand.

Famous Indian singer Kailash Kher and music producer Clinton Cerejo created Kalapi, a rare fusion piece of reggae and Indian music for Coke Studio India. Other than this high-profile piece, reggae is confined to a small, emerging scene in India. Reggae Rajahs are a reggae and bass music sound system crew based out of New Delhi, India. They are the first Jamaican style sound system in India and creators of Goa Sunsplash Festival. Thaikkudam Bridge, a neo-Indian band based in Kerala, India, is known for introducing reggae into Indian regional blues.

=== Australia and the Pacific ===
Reggae in Australia originated in the 1980s. Australian reggae groups include Sticky Fingers, Blue King Brown and Astronomy Class.

By the end of the 1980s, the local music scene in Hawaii was dominated by Jawaiian music, a local form of reggae.

New Zealand reggae was heavily inspired by Bob Marley's 1979 tour of the country and early reggae groups such as Herbs. The genre has seen many bands like Fat Freddy's Drop, Salmonella Dub, the Black Seeds and Katchafire emerging in more recent times, often involving fusion with electronica.

In 2017 the first-ever chart dedicated to reggae and dancehall music was established in Australia by radio presenter DJ Ragz, music producer DJ Wade and Dancehall Reggae Australia.

== See also ==
- List of dub artists
- List of reggae compilation albums
- Reggae festivals
- Reggae genres
- Cannabis
- Rastafari
- Skinhead
- Skanking

== Bibliography ==
- Jérémie Kroubo Dagnini (2008). Les origines du reggae: retour aux sources. Mento, ska, rocksteady, early reggae, L'Harmattan, coll. Univers musical. ISBN 978-2-296-06252-8 (in French)
- Jérémie Kroubo Dagnini (2011). Vibrations jamaïcaines. L'Histoire des musiques populaires jamaïcaines au XXe siècle, Camion Blanc. ISBN 978-2-35779-157-2 (in French)
- Manuel, Peter, with Kenneth Bilby and Michael Largey (2006). Caribbean Currents: Caribbean Music from Rumba to Reggae (2nd edition). Temple University Press, 2006. Philadelphia, PA: Temple University Press. ISBN 978-1-59213-463-2.
- O'Brien Chang, Kevin & Chen, Wayne (1998). Reggae Routes: The Story of Jamaican Music. Ian Randle Publishers. ISBN 978-976-8100-67-2.
- Leymarie, Isabelle (1996). Du tango au reggae: musiques noires d'Amérique latine et des Caraïbes. Paris: Flammarion. ISBN 978-2082108133.
- Leymarie, Isabelle (1998). Músicas del Caribe. Madrid: Akal. ISBN 978-8440677051.
- Larkin, Colin, ed. (1998). The Virgin Encyclopedia of Reggae. Virgin. ISBN 978-0-7535-0242-6.
- Barrow, Steve & Dalton, Peter (2004). The Rough Guide to Reggae (3rd ed.). Rough Guides. ISBN 978-1-84353-329-0.
- Morrow, Chris (1999). Stir It Up: Reggae Cover Art. Thames & Hudson. ISBN 978-0-500-28154-3.
- Jahn, Brian & Weber, Tom (1998). Reggae Island: Jamaican Music in the Digital Age. Da Capo Press. ISBN 978-0-306-80853-1.
- Hurford, Ray, ed. (1987). More Axe. Erikoispaino Oy. ISBN 978-951-99841-4-8.
- Potash, Chris, ed. (1997). Reggae, Rasta, Revolution: Jamaican Music from Ska to Dub. Schirmer Books. ISBN 978-0-8256-7212-5.
- Baek, Henrik & Hedegard, Hans (1999). Dancehall Explosion, Reggae Music into the Next Millennium. Samler Borsen Publishing, Denmark. ISBN 978-87-981684-3-0.
- Katz, David (2000). People Funny Boy: The Genius of Lee Scratch Perry. Payback Press, UK. ISBN 978-0-86241-854-0.
- Lesser, Beth (2002). King Jammy's. ECW Press. ISBN 978-1-55022-525-9.
- Stolzoff, Norman C. (2000). Wake The Town And Tell The People. Duke University Press, USA. ISBN 978-0-8223-2514-7.
- Davis, Stephen & Simon, Peter (1979). Reggae Bloodlines: In Search of the Music and Culture of Jamaica. Da Capo Press. ISBN 978-0-306-80496-0.
- Katz, David (2003). Solid Foundation - An Oral history of Reggae. Bloomsburry, UK. ISBN 978-1-58234-143-9.
- de Koningh, Michael; Cane-Honeysett, Laurence (2003). Young Gifted and Black - The Story of Trojan Records. Sanctuary Publishing, UK. ISBN 978-1-86074-464-8.
- de Koningh, Michael & Griffiths, Marc (2003). Tighten Up - The History of Reggae in the UK. Sanctuary Publishing, UK. ISBN 978-1-86074-559-1.
- Bradley, Lloyd (2001). Bass Culture. When Reggae Was King. Penguin Books Ltd, UK. ISBN 978-0-14-023763-4.
- Bradley, Lloyd (2000). This Is Reggae Music. The Story of Jamaica's Music. Penguin Books Ltd, UK. ISBN 978-0-802-13828-6.
- Chang, Jeff (2005). Can't Stop, Won't Stop: A History of the Hip-Hop Generation. St. Martin's Press, 2005. ISBN 978-0-312-30143-9.
