= Harmonic rhythm =

Rate at which chords change (or progress) in a musical composition

Two harmonizations of "Yankee Doodle"

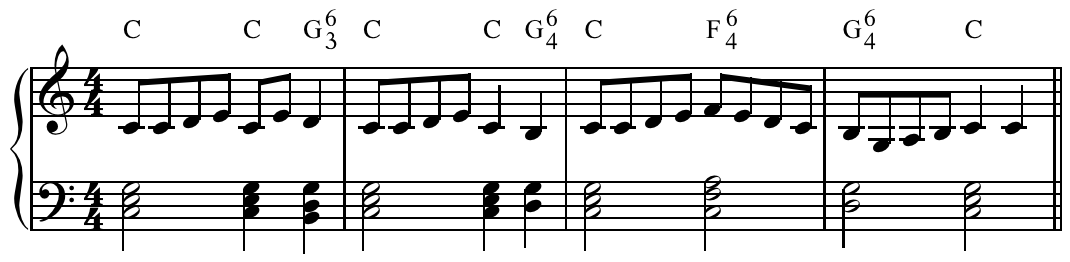
Note the slower harmonic rhythm.

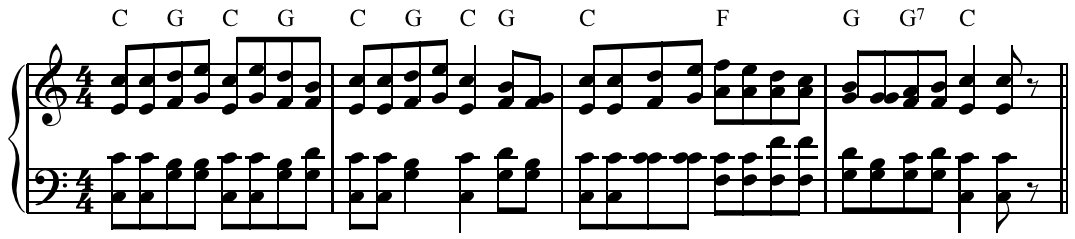
Note the faster harmonic rhythm.

In music theory, harmonic rhythm, also known as harmonic tempo, is the rate at which the chords change (or progress) in a musical composition, in relation to the rate of notes. Thus a passage in common time with a stream of sixteenth notes and chord changes every measure has a slow harmonic rhythm and a fast surface or "musical" rhythm (16 notes per chord change), while a piece with a trickle of half notes and chord changes twice a measure has a fast harmonic rhythm and a slow surface rhythm (1 note per chord change). Harmonic rhythm may be described as strong or weak.

According to William Russo harmonic rhythm is, "the duration of each different chord...in a succession of chords." According to Joseph Swain (2002 p. 4) harmonic rhythm, "is simply that perception of rhythm that depends on changes in aspects of harmony." According to Walter Piston (1944), "the rhythmic life contributed to music by means of the underlying changes of harmony. The pattern of the harmonic rhythm of a given piece of music, derived by noting the root changes as they occur, reveals important and distinctive features affecting the style and texture."

Strong harmonic rhythm is characterized by strong root progressions and emphasis of root positions, weak contrapuntal bass motion, strong rhythmic placement in the measure (especially downbeat), and relatively longer duration.

"The 'fastness' or 'slowness' of harmonic rhythm is not absolute, but relative," and thus analysts compare the overall pace of harmonic rhythm from one piece to another, or the amount of variation of harmonic rhythm within a piece. For example, a key stylistic difference between Baroque music and Classical-period music is that the latter exhibits much more variety of harmonic rhythm, even though the harmony itself is less complex.

For example, the first prelude (BWV 846) from J. S. Bach's The Well-Tempered Clavier, illustrates a steady harmonic rhythm of one chord change per measure, although the melodic rhythm is much faster.
