= Mezrab (plectrum) =

Plectrum or wooden hammer for various Iranian or Indian string instruments

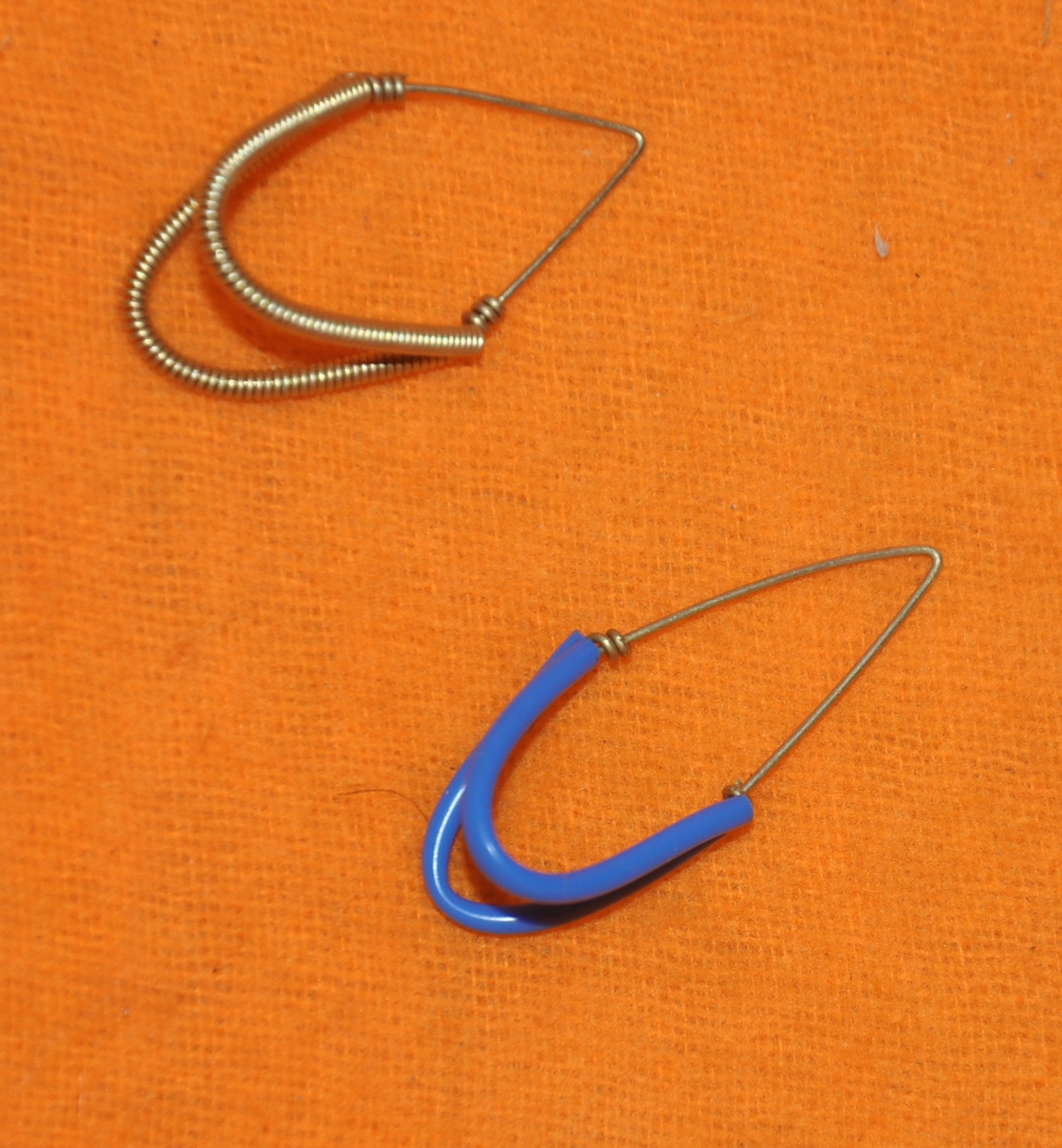
Mezrab

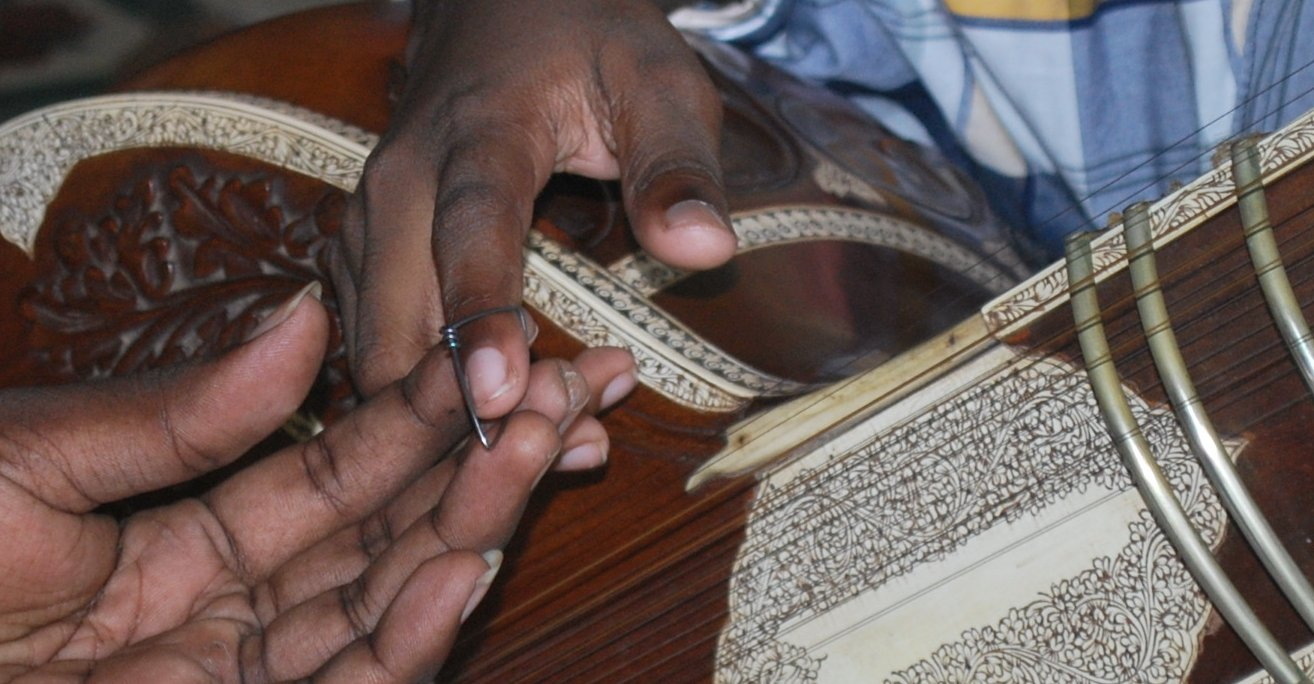
Sitar mezrab

A mezrāb or miżrāb (Arabic: مِضْراب), also known as a zak͟hma or zak͟hmeh (Persian: زخمه), is a plectrum which is used for several Iranian and Indian string instruments.

For sitar, a mezrab is worn on the finger of a sitar player. It is a plectrum made by hand from a continuous strand of iron used to strike the strings of the sitar. Although it is generally worn on the index finger, a second mezrab is sometimes worn on the middle or little finger. The mezrab fits tightly on the end of the finger so that it does not move while playing, intended to be projected roughly 1/4 inch from the end of the finger.

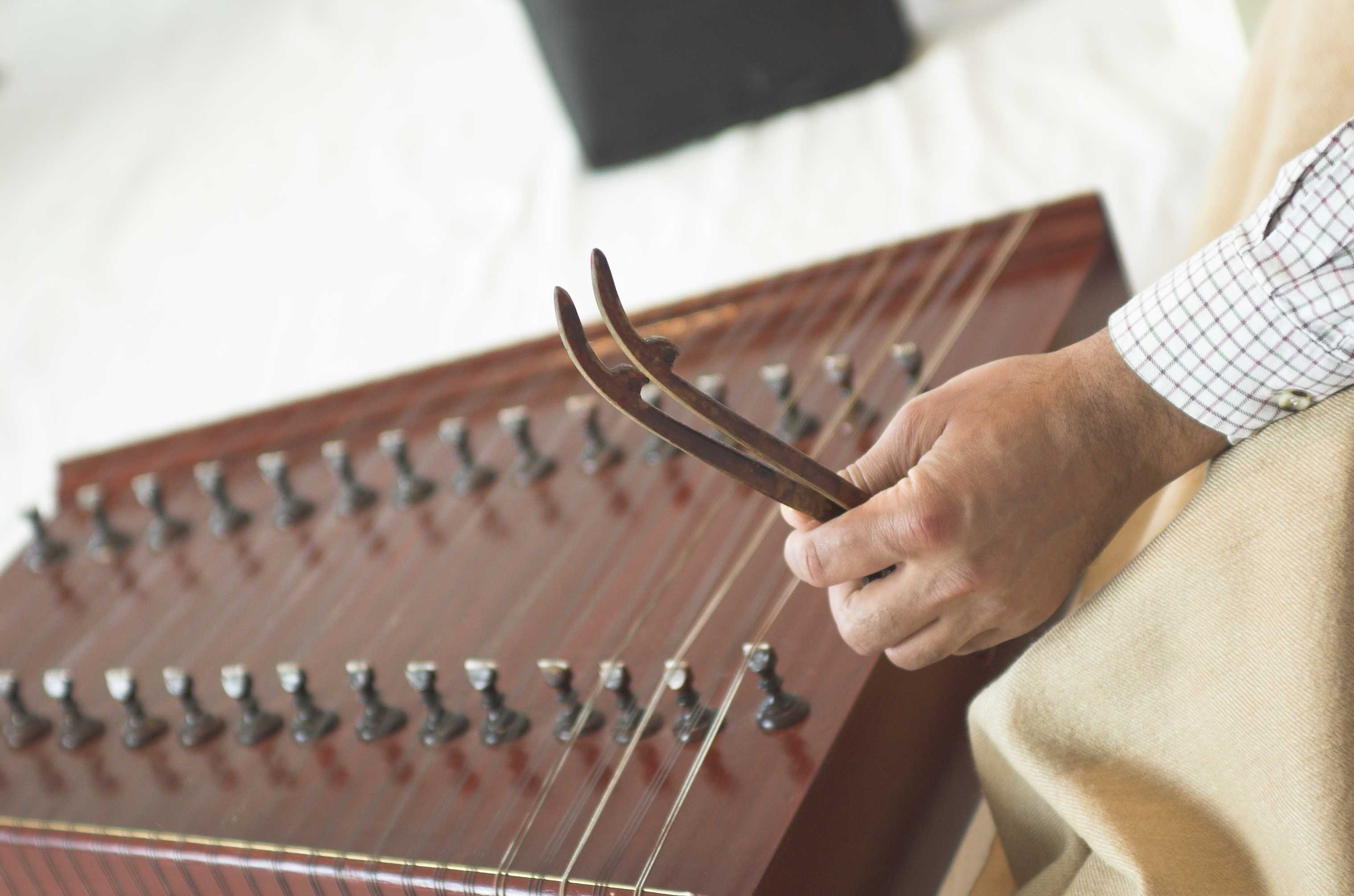
Lightweight hammers played on a Santur

Mezrab is also the name for the lightweight wooden hammer used to play the Persian santur.

== Different strokes used ==
There are four different Bols (strokes) used when playing sitar: Da, Ra, Dir and Dra.

- Da Bol - When the stroke is from outward to inward on the first string.
- Ra Bol - When the stroke is from inward to outward on the first string.
- Dir Bol - When the first string is stroked rapidly from both sides. It is similar to tremolo picking on guitars.
- Dra Bol - when the first string is stroked from inward and then immediately outward very fast, giving the outward stroke more power/emphasis than inward stroke.

== See also ==
- Crosspicking
- Fingerpick
- Flatpicking
- Guitar pick
- Hybrid picking
- Plectrum
