= Mohammad Reza Azadehfar =

Iranian ethnomusicologist (b. 1969)

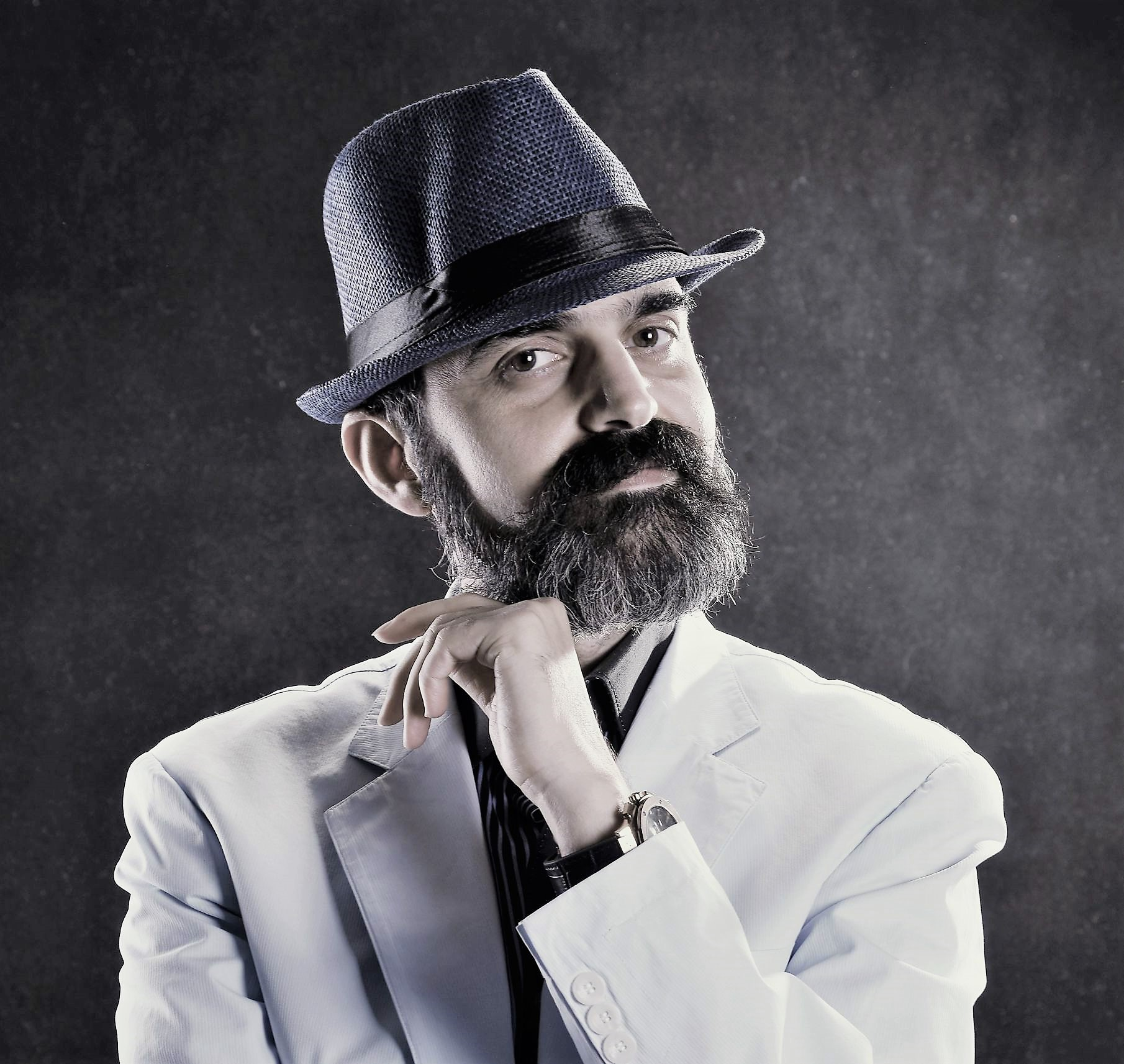

A santur (dulcimer) performance in Iranian style by Mohammad R Azadehfar

Mohammad Reza Azadehfar (Persian: محمدرضا آزاده‌فر; born 1969 in Isfahan) is an Iranian professor in ethnomusicology and a santūr performer. He started learning the Iranian traditional dulcimer (santūr) under the supervision of Sa’id Na’imimanesh in 1981 and spent some 4 years at the Conservatory of Isfahan. In 1988, he moved to Tehran and attended classes in the santūr given by Faramarz Payvar and Sa’id Sabet.

Azadehfar is also interested in film studies. He studied cinema at the Iranian Youth Cinema Society in 1982 and in 1988 he entered the faculty of Cinema and Theater at Tehran University of Arts to take a BA in cinema. His special interest in cinema was film scoring and editing. Azadehfar won the prize for best film scoring in 1987 for a short film by Asghar Farhadi and a prize for best editing in 1993 at the National Festival of Youth Cinema.

Since 1993, Azadehfar has mainly focused on theoretical issues of Iranian music. He began his studies by attending an MA research program in Tehran working on the topic of “General Training in Iranian Music.” His dissertation was later published as a book in the Persian language and sold more than 5000 copies. Rhythm is especially interesting to Azadehfar. He learned the Iranian percussion instrument the tombak and moved to Sheffield in England to do a PhD program on “Rhythmic Structure in Iranian Music” in 1999. He finished his PhD program in 2003 and was admitted to a post-doctoral program in SOAS, University of London in the same year. He ended his fellowship in SOAS in 2005 and returned to Iran.

In 2005, Azadehfar was appointed to the Music Faculty in Tehran University of Art. In 2010, he was elected as a Dean of the Music Faculty, a post which he held until 2014. During this time he established the Ethnomusicology program in this faculty and spent some years teaching there. He is now Ethnomusicology Professor in this faculty.

In 2014, the Executive Board of ICTM (International Council for Traditional Music) appointed Azadehfar as ICTM Liaison Officer for Iran.

== Awards ==
- 1987, Winner of prize for best short film music at Isfahan Youth Cinema Festival
- 1988, Winner of prize for best music composition at Isfahan Music Conservatory
- 1995, Winner of prize for best edit (montage) of fantasy musical film: “The Familiar Voice” at Iran Youth Cinema Nation-wide Festival.
- 2019, Winner of prize for best author of music book: Melodic Structure in Iranian Music, awarded by Iranian National Music House.
- 2025, Award-winning volume The Routledge Companion to Ethics and Research in Ethnomusicology, as a co-author which received the 2025 Ellen Koskoff Edited Volume Prize for exceptional merit in ethnomusicological scholarship.

== Bibliography ==
- 2026 Cultural Perspectives in Video Game Audio, Publisher: Routledge. ISBN 978-1-032-96946-6 * https://www.routledge.com/Cultural-Perspectives-in-Video-Game-Audio/Azadehfar/p/book/9781032969459/
- 2023 Good Research versus Ethical Participation at Muslim Women's Ceremonies in Iran, in the Routledge Companion to Ethics and Research in Ethnomusicology Publisher: Routledge. ISBN 9780367490034 link to Good Research versus Ethical Participation
- 2022 Ethnomusicology Lines of Investigation [Persian Version], Published by Nashr-e Ney, Tehran, Iran ISBN 978-622-06-0428-0 [Persian]. link to table of contents
- 2019 Music Tourism: A Strategy for Sustainable Urban and Rural Development in Iran [Persian Version], Published by Nashr-e Markaz, Tehran, Iran ISBN 9789642134311 [Persian]. Music Tourism
- 2017 Third Edition of Rhythmic Structure in Iranian Music, published by University of Arts, Iran ISBN 978-600-6513-14-0 [English].https://www.researchgate.net/publication/322329754_Rhythmic_structure_in_Iranian_music_3rd_Edition
- 2017 Melodic Structure in Iranian Music [Persian Version], Published by Nashr-e Markaz, Tehran, Iran ISBN 9789642133635 [Persian].
- 2017 The Basics of Melody Creation in Composition, Published by Nashr-e Markaz, Tehran, Iran ISBN 9789642133321 [Persian].
- 2016 The Arts (Official Book of Grade 10, Secondary Schools in Iran), Published by the Iranian Ministry of Education, Curriculum and Textbook Developments Office, Tehran, Iran ISBN 9789640525913 [Persian].
- 2016 Music in Islamic Philosophy and Theosophy, A Short Introduction, Published by Nashr-e Markaz, Tehran, Iran ISBN 9789642133079 [Persian].
- 2016 Arts and Ethics, Published by Soureh Mehr, Tehran, Iran ISBN 978-6000301941 [Persian].
- 2014 General Knowledge of Music: An Insight into Iranian Music Theory, Dastgah System, Musical Instruments and Music History, Published by Nashre Ney, Tehran, Iran ISBN 978-9641853787 [Persian].
- 2013 Theoretical and Practical Bases of Film Music: An Essay on Film Music in the World of Islam, Published by Soroush Mehr, Tehran, Iran ISBN 978-6001755309 [Persian].
- 2011 Second Edition of Rhythmic Structure in Iranian Music, published by University of Arts, Iran ISBN 964-6218-47-4 (9789646218475) [English].
- 2011 Epic and Music, published by Iranian Institute for Research of Culture, Art and Communications, Tehran, Iran ISBN 6005574809 [Persian].
- 2006 The Rhythmic Structure in Iranian Music (402 pages, published by University of Arts, Iran) ISBN 964-6218-47-4 (9789646218475) [English].
- 1996 General Training in Iranian Music ISBN 964-91537-2-1, [Persian].
- 1992 Specialised Textbook for Concours in Arts (Entrance University Exams), Published by Jahad Daneshgahi Publications [Persian].
- 1992 The 3000 Test of Art Concours, Published by Jahad Daneshgahi Publications [Persian]
