= List of hybrid picking guitarists =

This is an alphabetized list of guitarists who are notable for their use of the hybrid picking technique in live performances or studio recordings. Musicians are listed here only if their use of this technique has been especially significant.

== A-E ==
- Gustavo Assis-Brasil (born 1973) is a jazz guitarist and author of four instructional books on hybrid picking.
- Chet Atkins (1924–2001)
- Paul Brady
- Roy Buchanan (1939–1988)
- James Burton (born 1939) is probably the most-recorded hybrid picking guitarist, appearing on more than 360 albums with Ricky Nelson, Elvis Presley, Merle Haggard, and many others. Burton, who has influenced many other guitarists during his long career, uses a Fender Medium flatpick between thumb and first finger, and a National metal fingerpick on his middle finger.
- John Butler (born 1975), leader of the platinum-selling John Butler Trio, uses acrylic fingernails for both hybrid picking and fingerpicking. He developed his own hybrid style on acoustic dobro and guitar while growing up in Australia.
- Glen Campbell (1936–2017)
- Roy Clark (1933–2018)
- Jerry Donahue (born 1946)
- Nokie Edwards (1935–2018)
- Tommy Emmanuel (born 1955)
- Buckethead (born 1969)

== F-J ==
- Isaac Guillory (born 1947) Made it his signature technique.
- Brett Garsed (born 1963)
- Rory Gallagher (1948–1995) Hybrid picking was used most notably and most often in his acoustic playing, in songs such as 'Unmilitary Two-Step', 'Out on the Western Plain', and 'Pistol Slapper blues'.
- Cliff Gallup (1930–1988)
- Danny Gatton (1945–1994)
- Billy Gibbons (born 1949)
- Steve Gillette (born 1942) Steve, songwriter of Darcy Farrow and many other well known songs, has been using a hybrid style of flatpicking for most of his career.
- Guthrie Govan (born 1971)
- George Harrison (1943–2001)
- Jimi Hendrix (1942–1970) Hybrid picking was used in his song The Burning of the Midnight Lamp
- Tim Henson
- Brent Hinds (1974-2025)
- Greg Howe (born 1963)
- Steve Howe (born 1947)
- Eric Johnson (born 1954)
- John Jorgenson (born 1956)

== K-P ==
- Jorma Kaukonen (born 1940)
- Mark Knopfler (born 1949)
- Greg Koch (musician) (born 1966)
- Wayne Krantz (born 1956)
- Albert Lee (born 1943), English country guitarist who plays Music Man and Fender Telecaster guitars equipped with B-Benders. While hybrid picking, Lee holds his Ernie Ball heavy gauge flatpick with his thumb and one finger. His usual pick grip at other times is with thumb and two fingers.
- Alex Lifeson (born 1953)
- Kiko Loureiro (born 1972), Guitarist for Brazilian Power metal band Angra and American Thrash metal band Megadeth
- John Lowery (born 1971)
- Lonnie Mack (1941-2016)
- Brent Mason (born 1959)
- Roger McGuinn (born 1942)
- Scotty Moore (1931-2016)
- Steve Morse (born 1954)
- Papa Noël Nedule (1940–2024)
- Roy Nichols (1932–2001)
- Simon Nicol (born 1950)
- Jimmy Page (born 1944)
- Brad Paisley (born 1972)
- John Petrucci (born 1967), guitarist for Progressive Metal band Dream Theater. He uses hybrid picking in the Liquid Tension Experiment song "Acid Rain".

== Q-Z ==
- Will Ray (born 1950)
- Jerry Reed (1937–2008)
- Don Rich (1941–1974)
- Robbie Robertson (1943) (Heavy use of hybrid picking when with The Hawks. Played Telecaster when backing Ronnie Hawkins and Bob Dylan.)
- Arlen Roth (born 1952)
- Brian Setzer (born 1959)
- Marty Stuart (born 1958)
- Ron "Bumblefoot" Thal (born 1969)
- Richard Thompson (born 1949)
- Ian Thornley (born 1972)
- Merle Travis (1917–1983)
- Steven Van Zandt (a.k.a. Little Steve, Miami Steve, etc). (born 1950) (He uses banjo-style finger picks, along with a regular guitar pick. Rhythm guitar work on the classic album 'Darkness on the Edge of Town', by Bruce Springsteen, features Van Zandt's arpeggios on almost all tracks.)
- Stevie Ray Vaughan (1954-1990)
- Vinnie Vincent (born 1952)
- Clarence White (1944–1973)
- Zakk Wylde (born 1967)

== See also ==
- Hybrid picking
- Chicken picking
- Fingerstyle guitar
- Flatpicking
