= Hossein Malek =

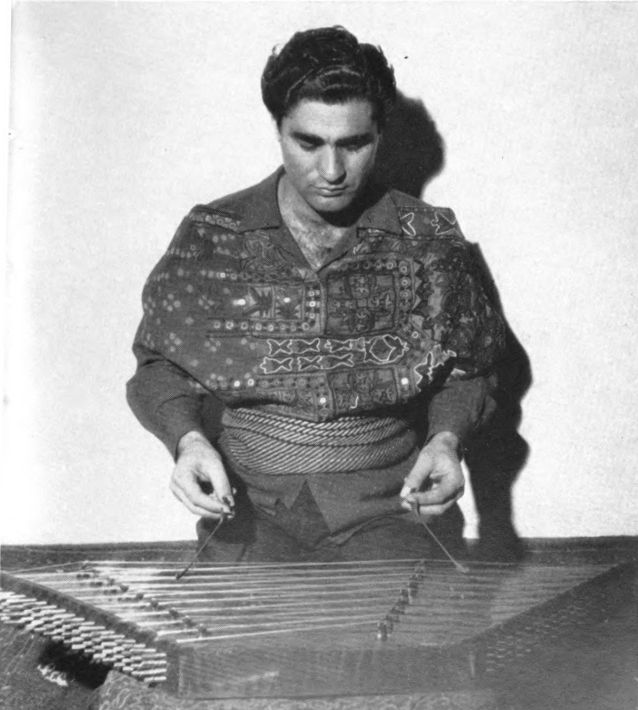

Background information
- Born: 7 July 1925 Tehran, Iran
- Died: 4 November 1999 (aged 74) Tehran, Iran
- Genres: Persian classical music
- Occupation: Musician
- Instruments: Santur, Violin, Tar, Setar, Kamancheh, Tombak

Hossein Malek (Persian: حسین ملک; 7 July 1925 – 4 November 1999) was an Iranian santur player and composer known for his innovations in Persian classical music and instrument-making.

== Early life ==
Hossein Malek was born in Tehran in 1925. His father, Abdollah Malek Goudar, was a woodworker. Influenced by several uncles who were musicians during the Qajar era, he and his brothers—Asadollah and Abdollah—pursued music. Asadollah became a violinist and kamancheh player, Abdollah played tombak, and Hossein focused on the santur.

Malek began studying santur at the age of eight under Habib Samayi, later continuing with Abolhasan Saba and Nour Ali Boroumand. He also studied with other notable musicians, including Shokrollah Gharahmani, Rokneddin Mokhtari, Hossein Yahaghi, Ebrahim Mansouri, and Mehdi Barkeshli.

== Career ==
In the early 1940s, Malek performed on Radio Iran and collaborated with Abolhasan Saba’s ensemble until around 1943. With the emergence of television in Iran, he became one of the first santur soloists to perform on national broadcasts.

Hussein Malek playing the santur

Later, he worked with the Ministry of Culture and Arts, participating in workshops focused on musical instrument construction. Drawing on knowledge gained from Saba (violin and santur making) and Arakelian (cello making), he began building santurs that gained widespread popularity. He introduced new designs by adding one extra bridge to the white strings and two to the yellow strings, resulting in a santur with eleven bridges on the yellow side and ten on the white. This allowed the instrument to accommodate both right and left tunings, enhancing its flexibility for accompaniment with vocalists.

In addition to santur, Malek was proficient in setar, tar, violin, tombak, and kamancheh. He performed with vocalists such as Ahmad Ebrahimi and Ahmad Salemi, and took part in international tours to promote Iranian music. He visited numerous countries including Pakistan, India, Afghanistan, Egypt, United Arab Emirates, Kuwait, Saudi Arabia, Bahrain, Tunisia, Jordan, Turkey, Thailand, Singapore, China, South Korea, the Soviet Union, Japan, Philippines, Netherlands, Belgium, Denmark, Finland, the United States, France, Spain, and Italy. During his visit to Venice, he received the "Yapolona" Medal as the top musician of the city.

He frequently performed both solo and with artists such as his brother Asadollah Malek, Ahmad Ebadi, and Mehdi Barkeshli, receiving awards and honors from multiple countries.

== Death ==
Hossein Malek died on 4 November 1999 in Tehran at the age of 74.
