= Kalanta of the Theophany =

Greek traditional carol

Kalanta of the Theophany (Καλαντα θεοφανειων) is a Greek traditional carol (Kalanta) translated into English as "Theophany Kalanta." This carol is commonly sung around the Theophany and accompanied by percussion instruments such as drums and santouri.

== Lyrics ==
| Καλαντα θεοφανειων (Greek) | Kalanta theophaneiōn (Greek) Transliteration | Kalanta of the Theophany (English) Translation |
| Σήμερα τα φώτα και οι φωτισμοί Κι χαρές μεγάλες κι αγιασμοί. Κάτω στον Ιορδάνη τον ποταμό κάθετ' η κυρά μας η Παναγιά. Καλημέρα! Καλησπέρα! Καλή σου μέρα αφέντη με την κυρά! Όργανo βαστάει, κερί κρατεί και τον Αϊ-Γιάννη παρακαλεί. Άϊ-Γιάννη αφέντη και βαπτιστή βάπτισε κι εμένα Θεού παιδί. Ν' ανεβώ επάνω στους ουρανούς να μαζέψω ρόδα και λίβανούς Καλημέρα! Καλησπέρα! Καλή σου μέρα αφέντη με την κυρά! | Sḗmera ta phṓta kai oi phōtismoí Ki charés megáles ki agiasmoí. Kátō ston Iordánē ton potamó káthet' ē kyrá mas ē Panagiá. Kalēméra! Kalēspéra! Kalḗ sou méra aphéntē me tēn kyrá! Órgano bastáei, kerí krateí kai ton Aï-Giánnē parakaleí. Áï-Giánnē aphéntē kai baptistḗ báptise ki eména Theoú paidí. N' anebṓ epánō stous ouranoús na mazépsō róda kai líbanoús Kalēméra! Kalēspéra! Kalḗ sou méra aphéntē me tēn kyrá! | Today is the lights and the enlightenment The happiness is big and the sanctification Down the Jordan River Sits our Lady the Blessed Virgin Mary Good day! Good evening! Good day to you master and matron She carries an organ, a candle she holds And pleads with St. John. St. John lord and Baptist Baptize me a child of god I shall ascend to the heavens To gather roses and incense Good day! Good evening! Good day to you master and matron! |
