= Kalanta of the New Year =

Traditional Greek New Year carol

Kalanta of the New Year (Αρχιμηνιά κι Αρχιχρονιά) is a Greek traditional carol (kalanta). This carol is commonly sung around the New Year and accompanied by light percussion instruments such as the Triangle (musical instrument) and Santouri.

== Lyrics ==
Αρχιμηνιά κι Αρχιχρονιά (Greek)

Αρχιμηνιά κι Αρχιχρονιά
ψηλή μου δεντρολιβανιά
κι αρχή καλός μας χρόνος
εκκλησιά με τ' άγιο θρόνος.

Αρχή που βγήκε ο Χριστός
άγιος και Πνευματικός,
στη γη να περπατήσει
και να μας καλοκαρδίσει.

Άγιος Βασίλης έρχεται,
και δεν μας καταδέχεται,
από την Καισαρεία,
συ' σαι αρχόντισσα κυρία.

Βαστά εικόνα και χαρτί
ζαχαροπλάστη, ζυμωτή
χαρτί και καλαμάρι
δες και με-δες και με το παλικάρι.

Το καλαμάρι έγραφε,
τη μοίρα του την έλεγε
και το χαρτί-και το χαρτί ομίλει
Άγιε μου-άγιε μου καλέ Βασίλη.

Κάτσε να φας, κάτσε να πιεις
κάτσε τον πόνο σου να πεις
κάτσε - κάτσε να τραγουδήσεις
και να μας καλοκαρδίσεις.

Archimēnia ki Archichronia (Greek) Transliteration

Archimēniá ki Archichroniá
psēlḗ mou dentrolibaniá
ki archḗ kalós mas chrónos
ekklēsiá me t' ágio thrónos.

Archḗ pou bgḗke o Christós
ágios kai Pneumatikós,
stē gē na perpatḗsei
kai na mas kalokardísei.

Ágios Basílēs érchetai,
kai den mas katadéchetai,
apó tēn Kaisareía,
sy' sai archóntissa kyría.

Bastá eikóna kai chartí
zacharoplástē, zymōtḗ
chartí kai kalamári
des kai me-des kai me to palikári.

To kalamári égraphe,
tē moíra tou tēn élege
kai to chartí-kai to chartí omílei
Ágie mou-ágie mou kalé Basílē.

Kátse na phas, kátse na pieis
kátse ton póno sou na peis
kátse - kátse na tragoudḗseis
kai na mas kalokardíseis.

Kalanta of the New Year (English) Translation

Beginning of the month and beginning of year
My rosemary who is very tall
and a beginning of a good new year
and church with the holy throne .

The start that brought Christ
the holy and Spiritual
on earth to walk
and lift up our hearts.

Saint Basil comes
and he does not dignify us
from Cesaria
though you are a lady

He holds a picture and paper
a confection in knitted dough
paper and fountain pen
look and look at me and the new young man

The fountain pain wrote
about his fortune
and the paper the paper spoke
oh my saint oh my saint good Basil

Stay to eat stay to drink
stay to tell us your pain
stay stay to sing
and lift up our hearts.
