= Zolani =

Surname:

- Kourosh Zolani (born 1970), Iranian-American composer and musician

Given name:

- Zolani Mahola (born 1981), South African singer
- Zolani Marali (born 1977), South African boxer
- Zolani Petelo (born 1975), South African boxer
- Zolani Tete (born 1988), South African boxer
