= James Alan Shelton =

American bluegrass guitarist (1960–2014)

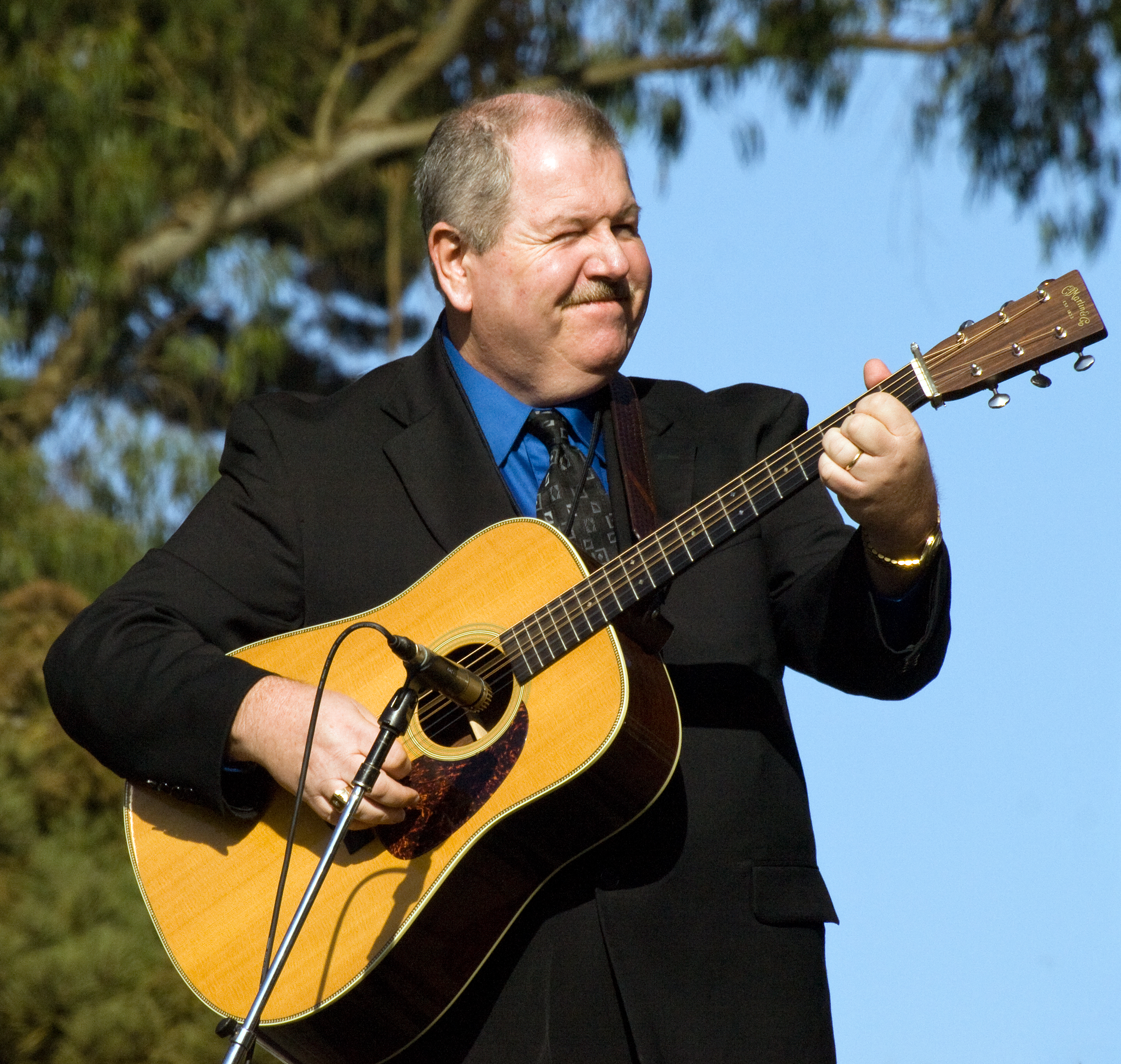
- Shelton in 2009

Background information
- Born: November 3, 1960; Kingsport, Tennessee, U.S.
- Died: June 3, 2014 (aged 53) Kingsport, Tennessee, U.S.
- Genres: Bluegrass, country
- Occupation(s): Singer, musician
- Instrument(s): Guitar, vocals
- Years active: 1992–2014

James Alan Shelton (November 3, 1960 – June 3, 2014) was an American bluegrass guitarist. Shelton was a solo musician, released 10 albums, and performed with the Clinch Mountain Boys.

== Life ==
James was born in Kingsport, Tennessee and raised in Gate City, Virginia. A major influence musically on James as a child were the Stanley Brothers, who were from nearby Dickenson County, Virginia. When he was 12 years old he saw Ralph Stanley perform and was inspired to learn the guitar and banjo. His father bought him his first guitar which cost $89.95. James worked for his father, at $1.25 an hour, to repay him for the instrument. He also found influence in the Carter Family, Flatt and Scruggs, and Bill Monroe. It was in the records of the Stanley Brothers where James heard the guitar playing of George Shuffler, who had developed a style of crosspicking. James would go on to idolize Shuffler, and eventually play with him during his professional career. He, along with his loving wife Greta, lived in Church Hill, Tennessee, until his death on June 3, 2014. Greta still resides there.

== Professional career ==
Shelton went on to play with Ralph Stanley and the Clinch Mountain Boys. His guitar playing was unique, mixing aspects of George Shuffler's crosspicking style, Doc Watson's flatpicking and a blues finger-style of picking. He later played dobro and guitar with the Flint Hill band.

== Solo career ==
Shelton recorded 10 solo albums:

- Blue in the Blue Ridge (Freeland FRC-CD 645, 1992)
- Clinch Mountain Guitar (Freeland FRC-CD 650, 1995)
- Road to Coeburn (Copper Creek CCCD 0154, 1997)
- Standing Room Only - 1999
- Song for Greta (Rebel REB-CD 1785, 2002)
- Guitar Tracks - 2003
- Half Moon Bay (Rebel REB-CD 1809, 2004)
- Walking Down the Line (Sheltone SR 1961, 2007)
- Gospel Guitar (Sheltone SR 1960, 2008)
- Copper Creek Sessions (Sheltone, 2012)
