= Khim =

Musical instrument

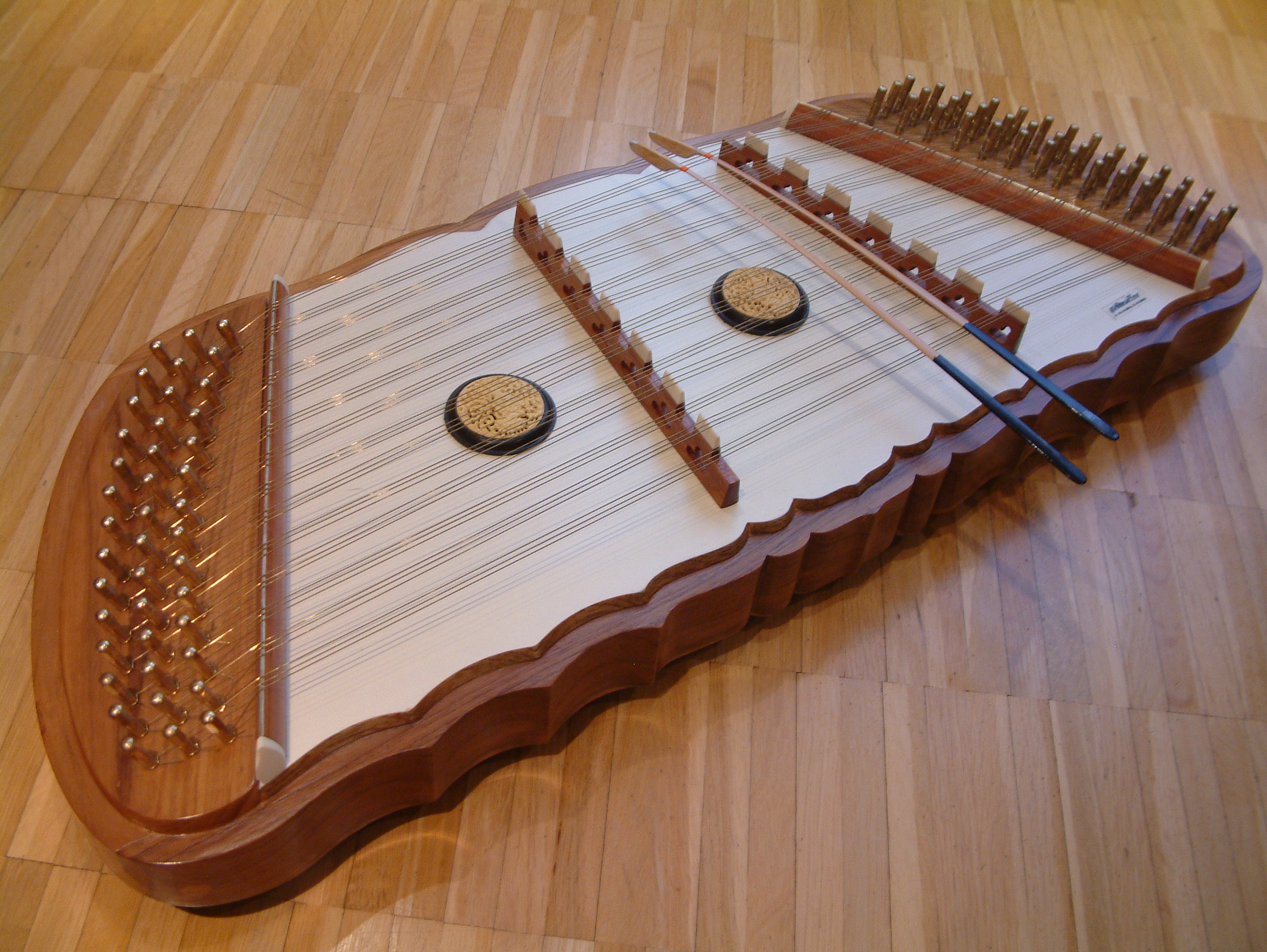
A butterfly-shape khim with two hammers

The khim (Thai: ขิม [kʰǐm]; Lao: ຂິມ [kʰĭm]; Khmer: ឃឹម [kʰɨm]) is a stringed musical instrument common to Indochina similar to the hammered dulcimer or cimbalom. This khim was introduced to Thailand from China, where a similar (though, since the late 20th century, usually larger) instrument is called yangqin itself derived from the Mesopotamian or Persian santur.

It is played with two flexible bamboo sticks with soft leather at the tips to produce a soft tone. This instrument can be played by either sitting down on the floor with the khim on the floor, or by sitting on a chair or standing while the khim is on a stand. The khim produces a bright and expressive sound when played. It is made of wood, with brass strings that are laid across the instrument.

The Australian-born musician and vocal artist Lisa Gerrard specialises in the use of a khim hammered dulcimer, featuring its music on several albums and performing with the instrument live on tour.

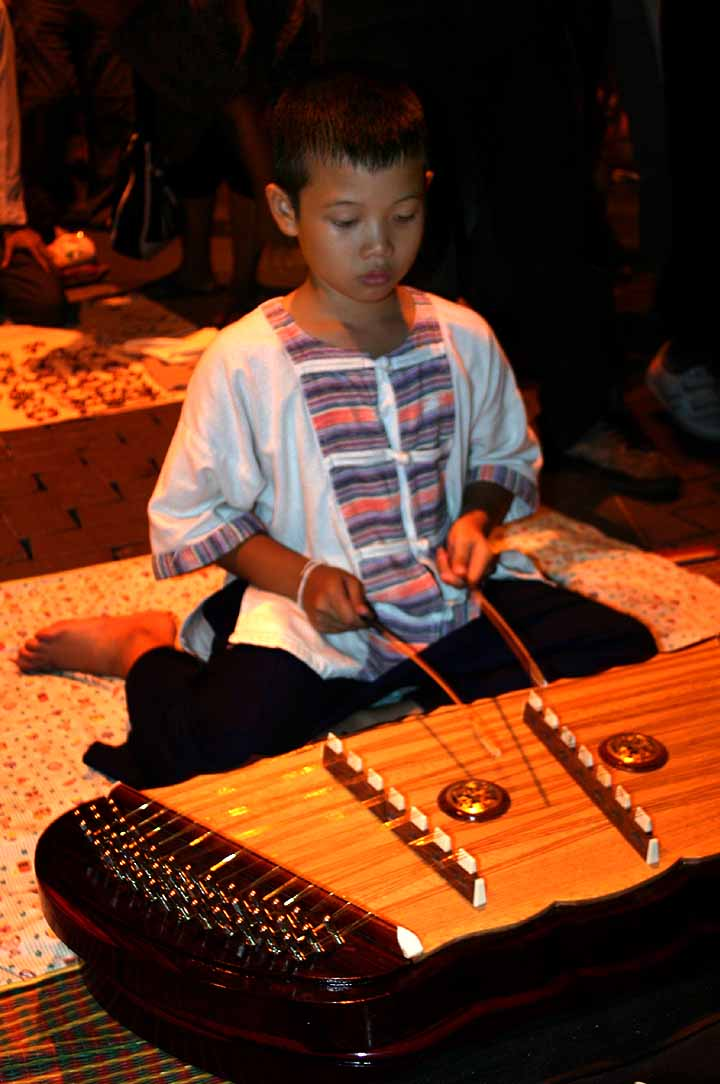
Thai boy playing a khim

== History ==
The khim came to China from Persia during the Ming to Qing dynasties (1368-1911) and was popular in northeast Guangdong. At the end of the Ayutthaya period, Thai people obtained the knowledge of how to build and play early versions of the khim from China. This instrument, along with its rise in popularity, came along with various other goods in trading arrangements with Chinese merchants. While the popularity of Chinese opera was rising, the instrument became popular due to its use within the opera group and this helped to further familiarise Thai people with the khim.

The khim was an especially popular instrument from around 1970-2004 because it was a central part in the Thai novel Khu Kam, which was later produced as a drama series and movie. The main character could play the khim very well, and the adaptations popularised the instrument with the song, "Nang Kruan".

There are many people who have preserved the Khim, such as the Luang Pradit Pairoh Foundation, and some school have even included the Khim as part of basic curriculum in Thai music lesson.

== Shape ==
Cambodian boy plays a khim.

=== Butterfly shape ===
This shape is the smallest size which contains two bridges with 7 notes (in khim, one note means 3 strings join together) and 42 strings. This shape is the original shape which was from China. From the past until these days, the popularity of this shape is still increasing

=== Irregular rectangle shape or trapezoid ===
This shape is the bigger size of khim with two bridges and 9, 11, or 15 notes. This trapezoid-shaped khim is very convenient to carry because it is a portable khim that is easy to carry.

=== Oval shape ===
This is the latest design with two bridges, 7 notes and 42 strings, which is also called a fancy khim. This shape is often painted with deep or bright color, and children who play the khim usually stick the cartoon sticker on the box. It is very attractive for children as it looks like a toy for them and the size of this shape is suitable for small children as well.

== Construction ==
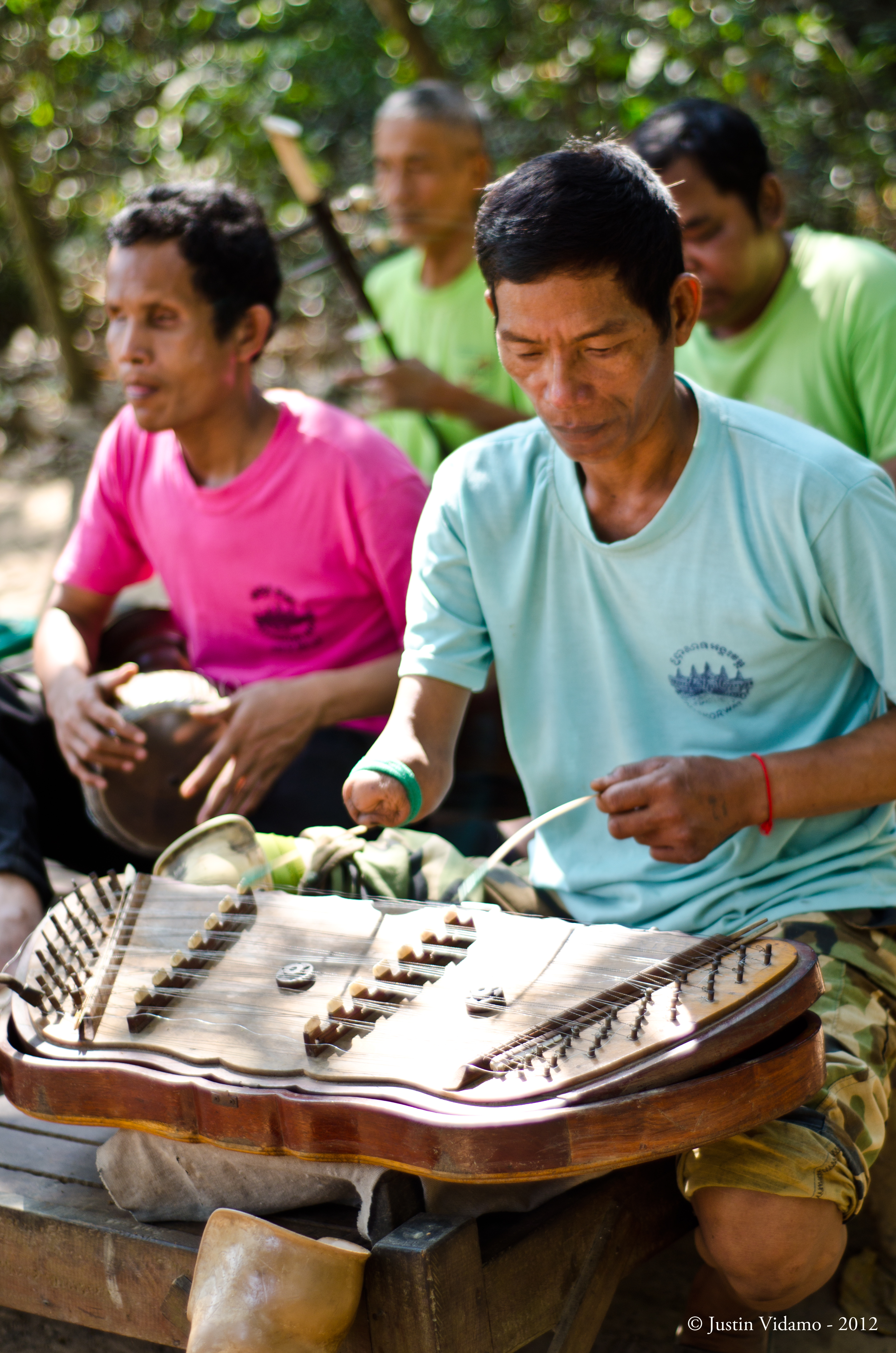
Cambodian playing the khim. These musicians are amputees, victims of landmines.

=== The bridge (Fret) ===
The bridge is a wooden device for the stringed musical instrument which support their strings and transfers the vibration from the strings to the other structural of the instrument. Khim has two bridges and there are many notes on the bridge bases on the different type of khim

==== Two bridges with 7 notes and 42 strings ====
Standard size that is popular among the primary students for beginning lessons. Lowest note ล (La2 or A2) left side, bass bridge. Middle note ล (La3 or A3) right side, treble bridge. Highest note ล (La4 or A4) left side, treble bridge.

==== Two bridges with 9 notes and 54 strings ====
This is popular among khim musicians because it has more selection on sound.

==== Two bridges with 11 notes and 66 strings ====
The 66-string khim is a large instrument and very heavy. People who play this type of khim should be the musician who has a high degree of performance skill. It can be tuned to the level of international scale as it has many strings. This is made for professional musicians and only used for special occasions.

=== Soundbox ===
Using a various type of wood to build the soundbox. To construct the soundboard, softwood is the best selection to construct the soundboard. Softwood has a light texture which helps creating the sound.

=== Sound holes ===
Sound holes are the holes on the soundboard to enhance the bright sound and prevent the humidity in the soundbox which creates the swelling of the wood.

=== Tuning pins and Hitch pins ===
The hitch pins are on the left side of the sound-box and tuning pins are on the right side. There are 42 pins on each side. Tuning this instrument is very easy but time consuming. The player inserts a type of wrench on the pins that stick up from the sides, but only turns the pins on the right side. Turning the pins on the left side can cause the string to break. Then the player turns the wrench which tightens or loosens the string to the desired pitch.

=== Strings ===
The khim’s string is a brass 24 gauge string. It is being hitched on the hitch pins on the left side of the sound box. There are 14 groups of strings on the khim, and each group has 3 strings. Overall, the khim has a total of 42 strings

== See also ==
- Hammered dulcimer
- Cimbalom
- Santur
