= Pejman Azarmina =

Iranian writer and businessman

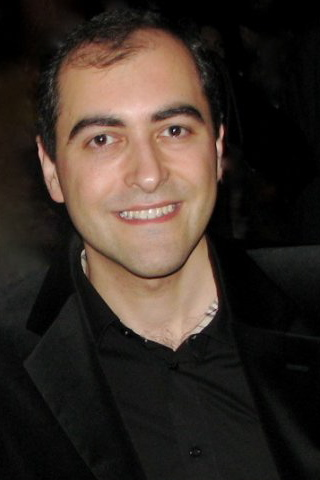
- Born: Pejman Azarmina; 1973 (age 52–53); Tehran, Iran
- Occupations: Sr. medical director, author, musician and entrepreneur
- Years active: 1995–present.
- Spouse: Sara Nasserzadeh
- Website: azarmina.com

Pejman Azarmina (Persian: پژمان آذرمینا, born in 1973) is an Iranian-American physician, author, musician and entrepreneur.

== Early life and education ==
Azarmina was born in Tehran, Iran. He began studying the santour at age 11 under Faramarz Payvar (1933‒2009), graduating from his private class after completing the Advanced Repertoire for the Santour (Persian: ردیف چپ کوک) in 1994. He studied music theory, harmony, and composition under Hossein Dehlavi and Ahmad Pejman (composition and counterpoint).

Azarmina studied medicine at Tehran University of Medical Sciences. He later earned a master's degree in Healthcare Management at University of Surrey, a graduate certificate in Medical Informatics from Oregon Health & Science University, and a certificate in coaching from New York University.

== Career ==
=== Medicine ===
In 1995, Azarmina published Common Medical Terms, a medical dictionary. In 1997, it was recognized as the best student book. In 2001, he authored the My Doctor series, aimed at explaining medical topics to the general public. In 2017, he co-authored the Sexuality Education Wheel of Context.

=== Music ===
Azarmina is a concert musician and santour instructor. He released his debut solo album, Old Persian Dances, 1996, followed by Shabdiz, in 2000. He later released Persian Nostalgia and Rebellious Solitude, and a performance recording of Payvar's Advanced Repertoire for the Santour .

=== Philanthropy ===
His philanthropic work includes serving as Vice-Chair of the Leadership and Professional Development Forum at the Public Affairs Alliance of Iranian Americans (PAAIA) NexGen NY, where he led development workshops for young Iranian-Americans.

== Discography ==
- 1994 Dialogue (Persian: گفتگو) [a collaborative album featuring all duets composed by Faramarz Payvar]
- 1996 Old Persian Dances (Persian: رنگهای هفت دستگاه)
- 2000 Shabdiz (Persian: شبدیز)
- 2011 Rebellious Solitude
- 2011 Persian Nostalgia
- 2020 Chapkook Advanced Repertoire for the Santour (Persian: ردیف چپ کوک استاد پایور)

== Books ==
- 1996 Common Medical Terms (Persian: واژه های زبانزد پزشکی)
- 2000 Old Persian Dances (Persian: رنگهای هفت دستگاه) ISBN 964-6409-42-3
- 2000 Shabdiz ISBN 964-5664-22-5
- 2000 Basic Epidemiology ISBN 964-456-675-0
- 2001 My Doctor (series) ISBN 964-456-555-X
- 2017 Sexuality Education Wheel of Context ISBN 1536854220
