= Crosspicking =

Guitar or mandolin playing technique

Crosspicking is a technique for playing the mandolin or guitar using a plectrum or flatpick in a rolling, syncopated style across three strings. This style is probably best known as one element of the flatpicking style in bluegrass music, and it closely resembles a banjo roll, the main difference being that the banjo roll is fingerpicked rather than flatpicked.

A typical element of the technique is the use of three pitches played repeatedly within a four-pulse rhythm. This results in a continual shifting of the pitches vis-a-vis the accented pulse. The three pitches are usually played on three adjacent strings—one per string. The pick direction can vary, depending on the required emphasis and the melody.

Crosspicking is a guitar style that uses a flatpick to imitate the sound of fingerpicking. It is used both as a lead style and as accompaniment. Using repeating patterns involving two or three strings, crosspicking is particularly effective at slow to mid-tempos...The basic [patterns are] forward and reverse "roll[s]"...played in the standard alternating picking pattern (dudududu) or in specialized patterns (dduddudd) or (uuduuduu).

Jesse McReynolds, "Somewhere Down South" from McReynolds Style Mandolin (1986)
Sample of Jesse McReynolds' crosspicking style on the mandolin

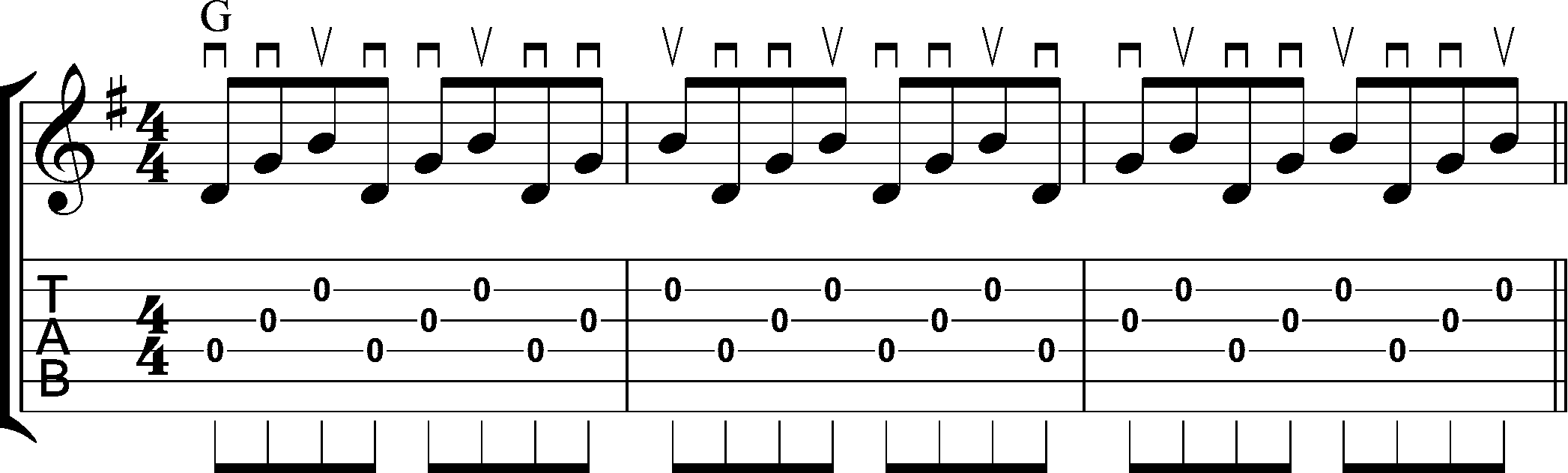
Forward "roll" on G (DDU)

Using "D" for down" and "U" for "up" (and slashes to indicate groups of three), mandolin player Jesse McReynolds used a crosspicking roll of

D - U - U / D - U - U / D - U . . .

creating a repeating pattern of notes that expresses the melody. Guitarist George Shuffler used a pick pattern of

D - D - U / D - D - U / D - D . . . .

The traditional banjo roll form is

D - D - U / D - D - U / D - D . . .

this helps to accentuate the "threes" nature of the pattern against the "four" rhythm.

The other way is using strict alternate picking:

D - U - D / U - D - U / D - U. . . .

This may be more comfortable for players who are using alternate picking for most of their playing. In actuality, one (or more) of the three pitches may be varied from one repetition of the pattern to the next, for instance the top note could be toggled up and down one step.

== Mandolin ==
McReynolds was the earliest exponent of the crosspicking style on the mandolin. He developed his crosspicking style with his brother in his band Jim & Jesse during the 1950s. McReynolds influenced later mandolin players such as Sam Bush and Chris Thile.

== Guitar ==
Though crosspicking is most associated with bluegrass music, it was first introduced by jazz guitarist Nick Lucas during the 1920s, most notably on his 1929 recording of "Painting the Clouds with Sunshine". Decades later, Don Reno would incorporate crosspicking in bluegrass music including on "Double Banjo Boogie" in 1954, though it was Bill Napier who would largely develop such crosspicking guitar techniques while working with the Stanley Brothers in the late 1950s. After Napier left the band in early 1960 to work with Charlie Moore, George Shuffler moved from upright bass to lead guitar and began developing his crosspicking style. Both Reno and Shuffler developed the technique as a "fill" for back-up and leads during this time. Along with Napier and Shuffler, other well-known guitarists who incorporated crosspicking include Doc Watson, Norman Blake, and Clarence White, whose styles influenced other guitarists, including David Grier, Tony Rice and Bob Miner. Such guitarists as Junior Blankenship, Ralph Stanley II, and James Alan Shelton continued crosspicking in styles influenced by Shuffler and Napier.

Among rock guitarists, King Crimson's Robert Fripp has made cross-picking a signature technique, which has influenced many other guitarists, particularly in progressive rock. Fripp teaches the technique to his students in Guitar Craft.

== See also ==
- Drum roll
- Guitar picking
- Hybrid picking
- Scruggs style
