= Plectrum =

Tool used to play stringed instruments

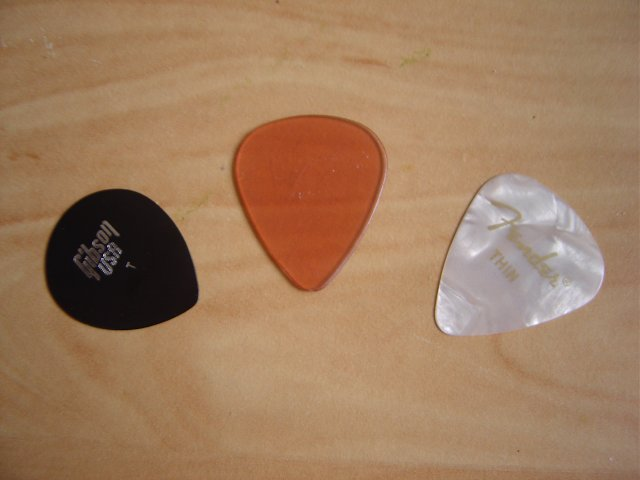
Three plectra for use with guitar

A plectrum (pl. plectra or plectrums) (Note: Plectra is used in formal writing, particularly in discussing the harpsichord as an instrument of classical music, while plectrums is more common in ordinary speech.) is a small flat tool used for plucking or strumming of a stringed instrument. For hand-held instruments such as guitars and mandolins, the plectrum is often called a pick and is held as a separate tool in the player's hand. Players of lap steel guitar and bluegrass style banjo music often wear a fingerpick, a style of plectrum that clips onto or wraps around the end of the fingers and thumb. In harpsichords, the plectra (traditionally made of crow quill) are attached to the jack mechanism.

The word plectrum is first attested in English 15th century. It is of Latin origin from Greek πλῆκτρον (plēktron), "anything to strike with, an instrument for striking the lyre..." derived from verb "πλήττω" or "πλήσσω" (plēssō), "to hit, to strike".

== Plectra wielded by hand ==
=== Guitars and similar instruments ===
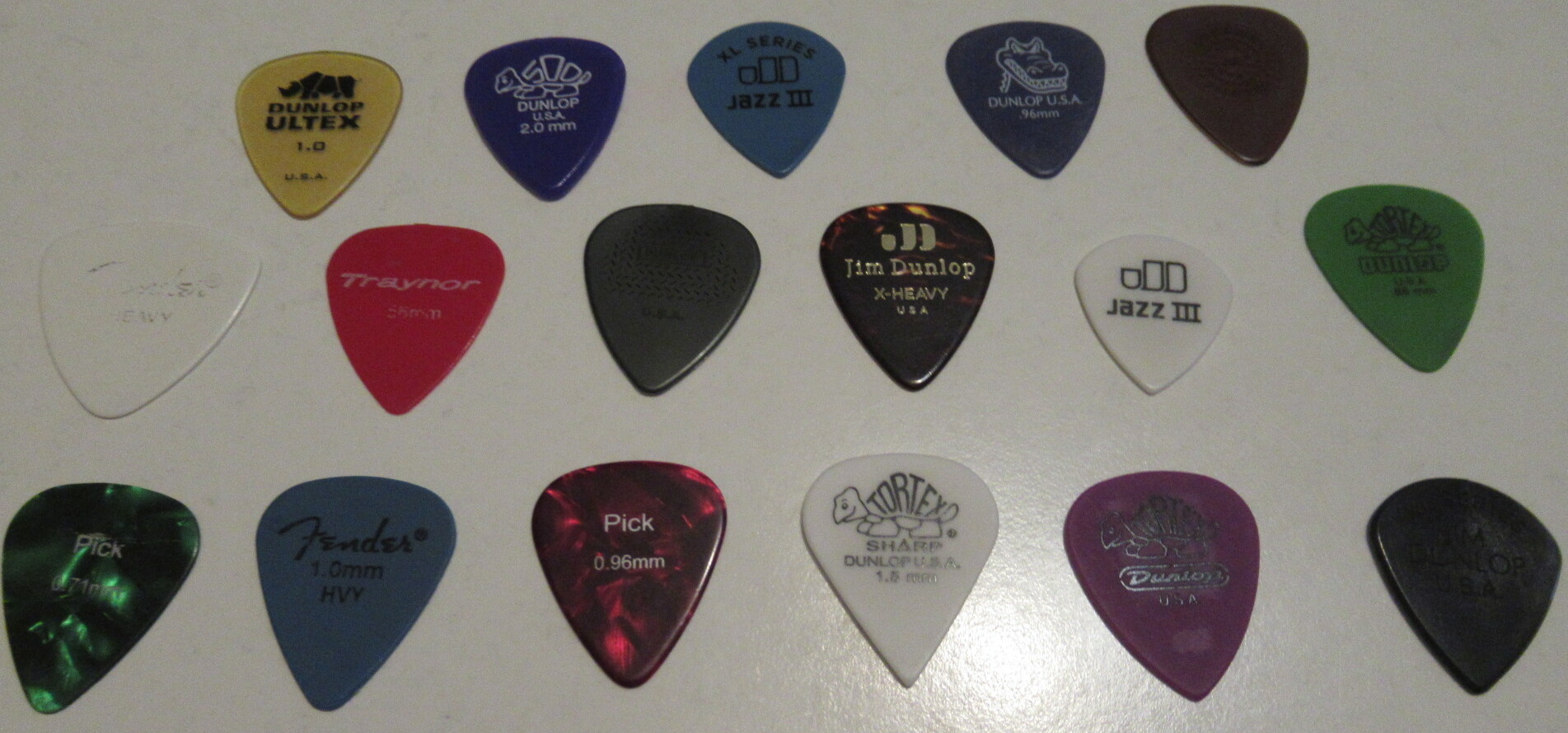
Assorted plectra for use with guitar

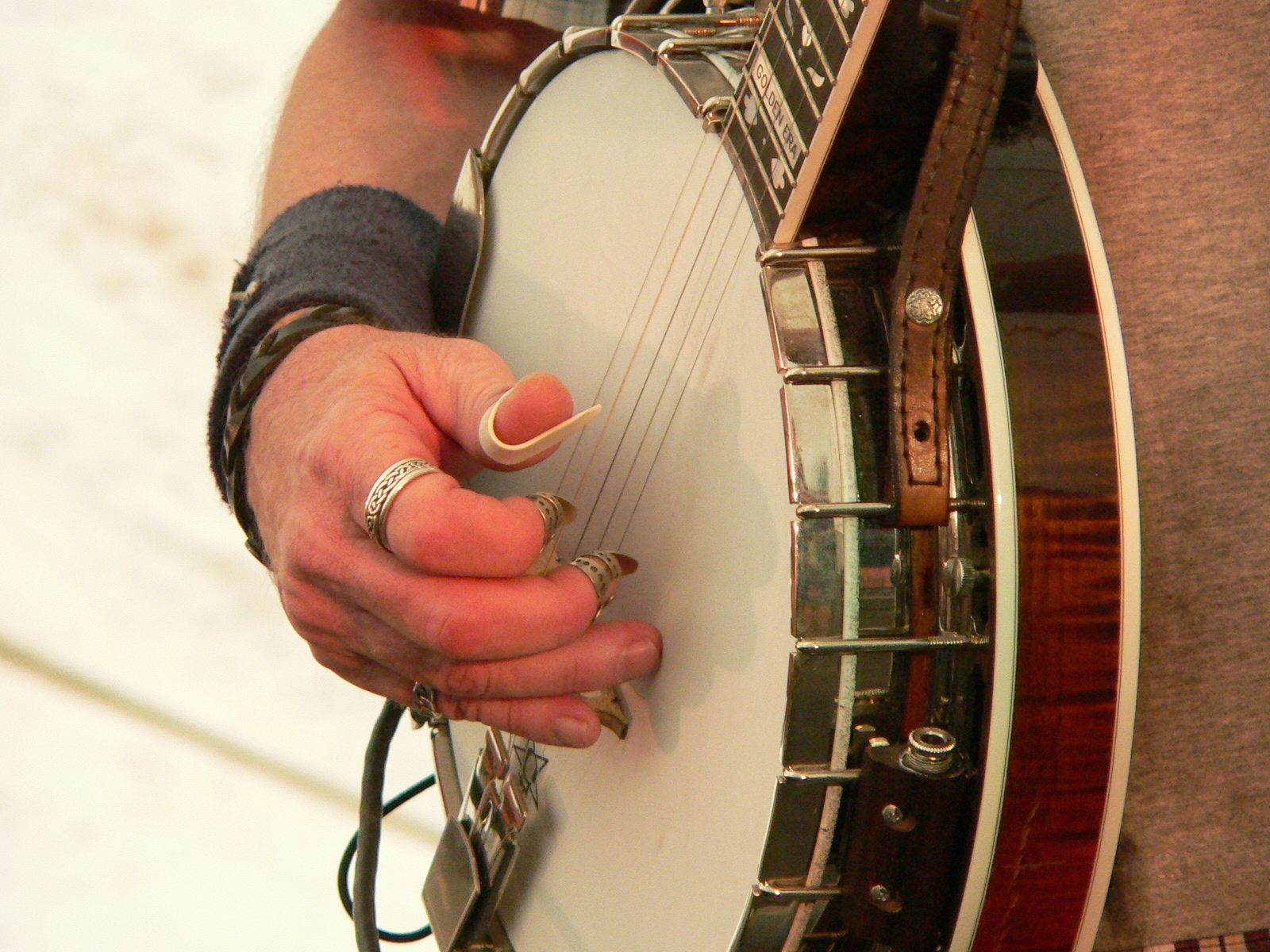
Don Wayne Reno wearing fingerpicks while playing a banjo

A plectrum for electric guitars, acoustic guitars, bass guitars and mandolins is typically a thin piece of plastic or other material most commonly shaped like a pointed teardrop or triangle, though the size, gauge, shape and width may vary considerably. Banjo and guitar players may wear a metal or plastic thumb pick mounted on a ring, and bluegrass banjo players often wear metal or plastic fingerpicks on their fingertips. Many guitarists use fingerpicks as well.

Guitar picks are made of a variety of materials, including celluloid, metal, and rarely other exotic materials such as turtle shell, but today delrin (a synthetic thermoplastic polymer) is the most common. For other instruments in the modern day, most players use plastic plectra but a variety of other materials, including wood and felt (for use with the ukulele) are common. Guitarists in the rock, blues, jazz and bluegrass genres tend to use a plectrum, partly due to the use of steel strings wearing out the player's fingernails quickly, but also because a plectrum provides a more "clear", "focused" and "aggressive" sound. Using a pick can also help guitarists to unlock techniques - such as pinch harmonics and pick scrapes - which are difficult to pull off with finger-picking. Many guitarists will also use the pick in combination with the remaining picking-hand fingers simultaneously, to combine the different advantages of flat-picking and finger picking. This technique is called hybrid picking, or more colloquially in country & bluegrass genres as "chicken pickin'".

A plectrum of the guitar type is often called a pick (or a flatpick to distinguish it from fingerpicks).

=== Non-Western instruments ===
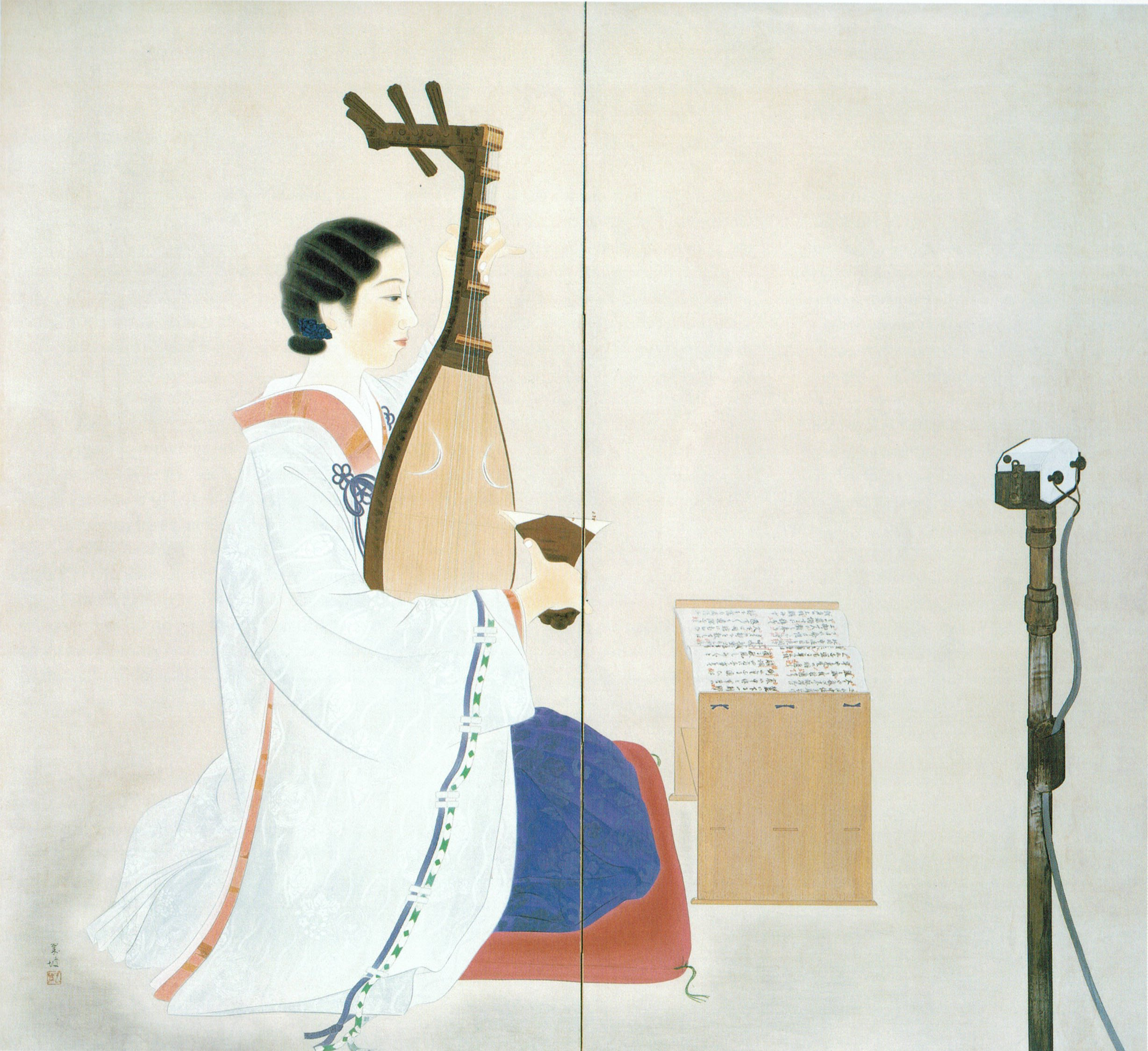
'Biwa Concert' by Shibata Suiha, painted screen, c. 1930, in the Honolulu Museum of Art

The plectra for the Japanese biwa and shamisen can be quite large, and those used for the Arabic oud are longer and narrower, replacing the formerly used eagle feather. Plectra used for Chinese instruments such as the sanxian were formerly made of animal horn, though many players today use plastic plectra.

Malay gambus plectra are made from water buffalo horn.

=== Plectra from around the world ===
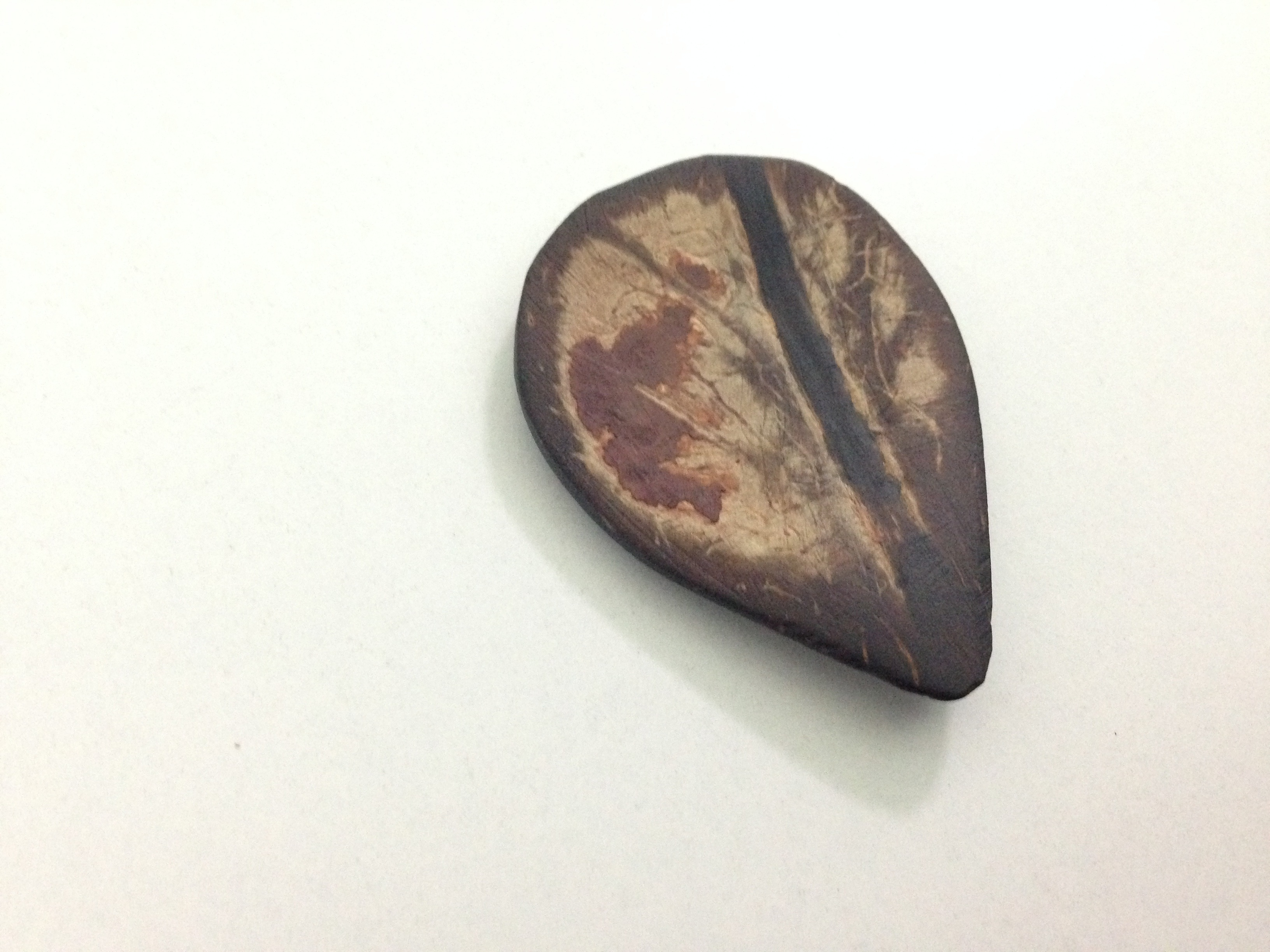
A traditional hand crafted coconut shell plectrum, used for playing the sarod. Also known as a "Javva".

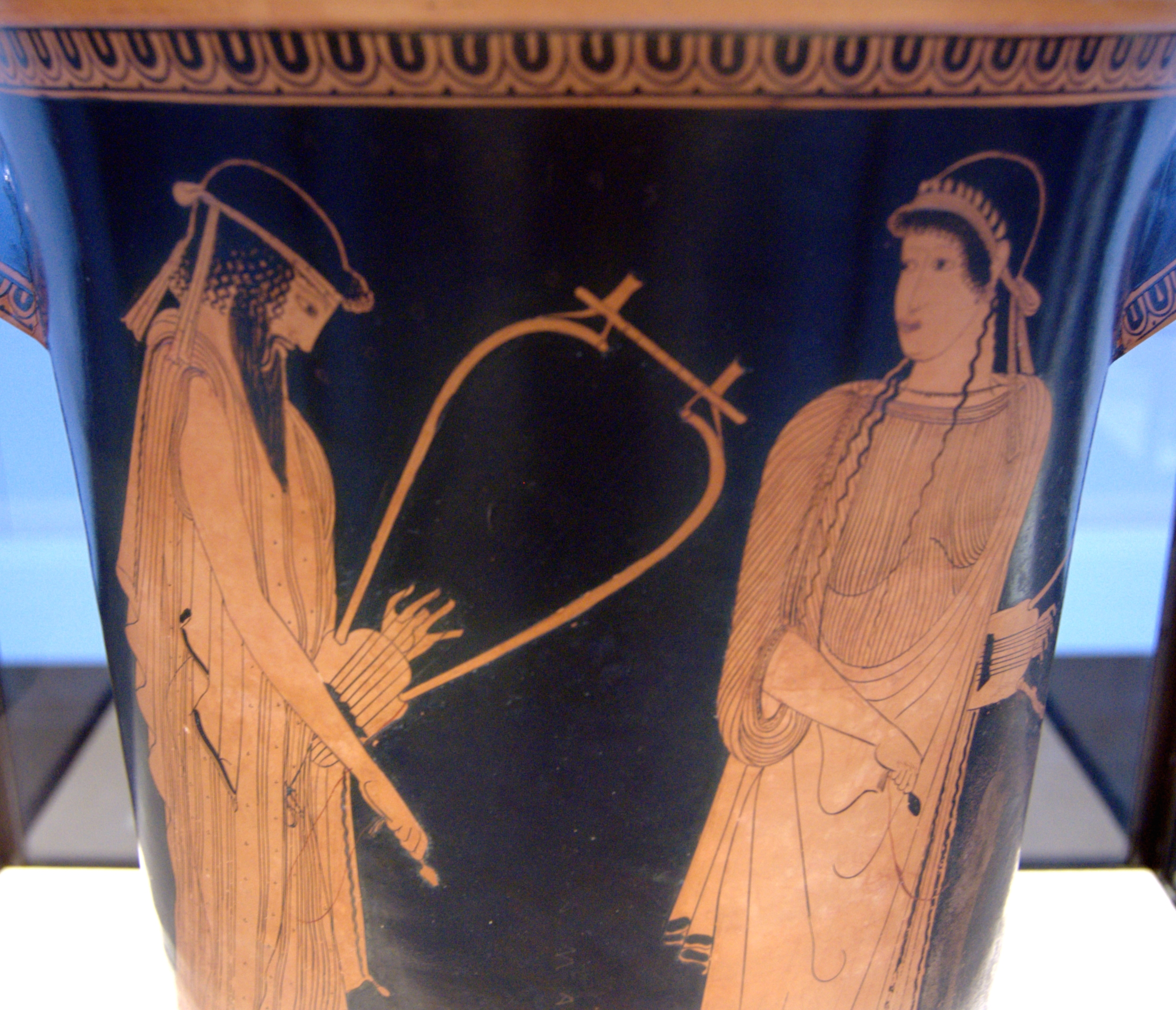
Alcaeus and Sappho holding their lyres and plectra. Attic red-figure calathus, ca. 470 BC, Staatliche Antikensammlungen (Inv. 2416)

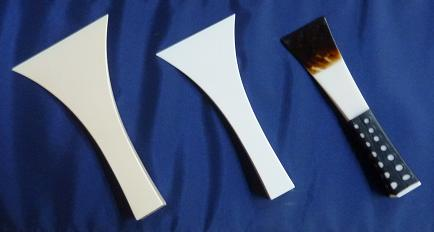
Bachi, or plectra for use with shamisen

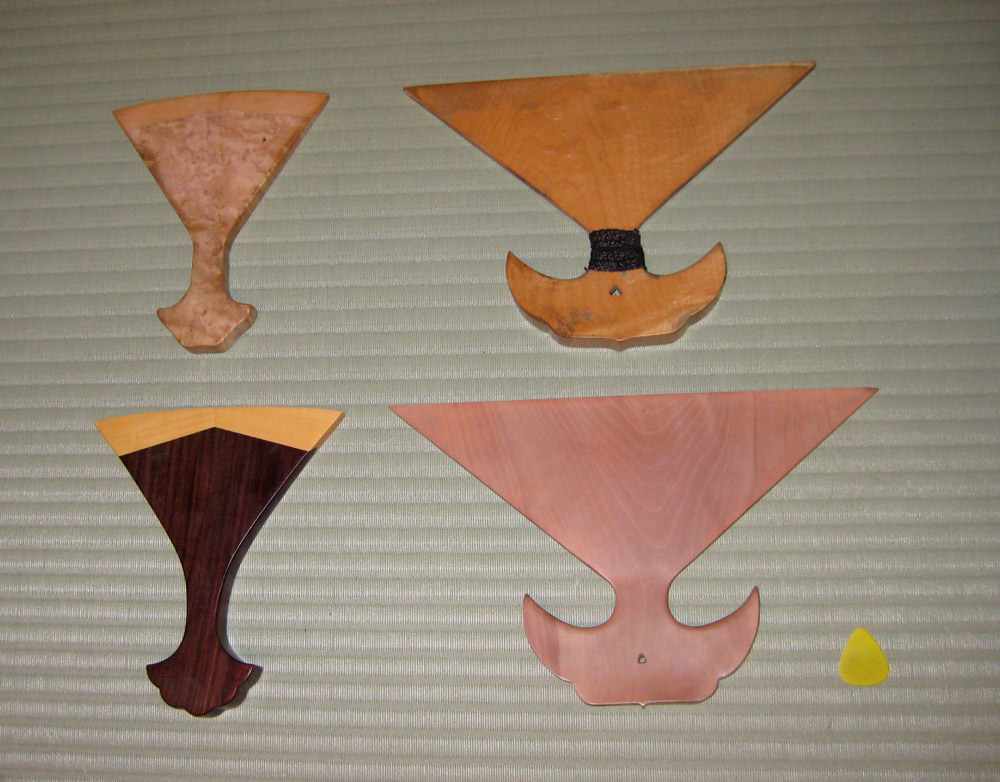
Biwa plectra

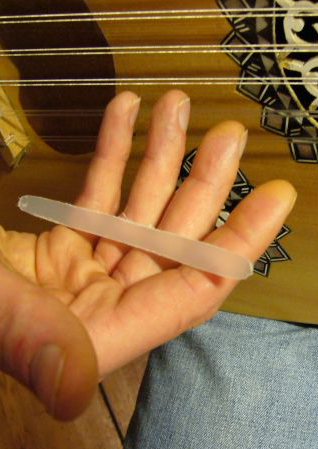
Risha for Oud

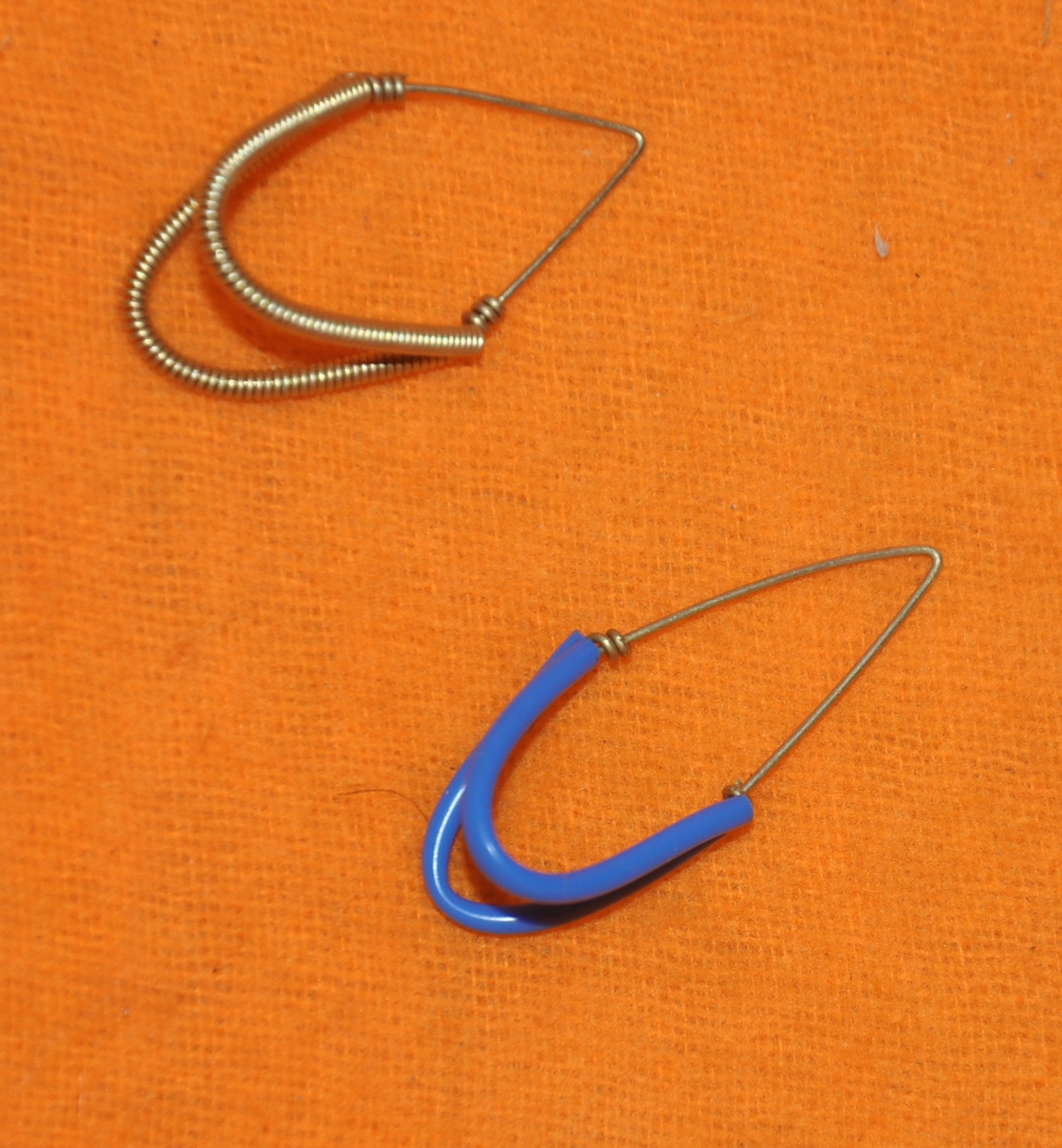
The mesrab, used in Persian and Indian music

== Plectra in harpsichords ==
The upper portion of a harpsichord jack holding a plectrum

In a harpsichord, there is a separate plectrum for each string. These plectra are very small, often only about 10 millimeters long, about 1.5 millimeters wide, and half a millimeter thick. The plectrum is gently tapered, being narrowest at the plucking end. The top surface of the plectrum is flat and horizontal and is held in the tongue of the jack; the tongue is pivoted so that the plectrum plucks the string when moving up, but is pushed away when moving down.

In the historical period of harpsichord construction (up to about 1800) plectra were made of sturdy feather quills, usually from crows or ravens. In Italy, some makers (including Bartolomeo Cristofori) used vulture quills. Other Italian harpsichords employed plectra of leather. In late French harpsichords by the great builder Pascal Taskin, peau de buffle, a chamois-like material from the hide of the European bison, was used for plectra to produce a delicate pianissimo.

Modern harpsichords frequently employ plectra made with plastic, specifically the plastic known as acetal. Some plectra are of the homopolymer variety of acetal, sold by DuPont under the name "Delrin", while others are of the copolymer variety, sold by Ticona as "Celcon". Harpsichord technicians and builders generally use the trade names to refer to these materials. In either of its varieties, acetal is far more durable than quill, which cuts down substantially on the time that must be spent in voicing (see below).

Several contemporary builders and players have reasserted the superiority of bird quill for high-level harpsichords. While the difference in sound between acetal and quill is acknowledged to be small, what difference may exist is held to be to the advantage of quill. In addition, quill plectra tend to fail gradually, giving warning by the diminishing volume, whereas acetal plectra fail suddenly and completely, sometimes in the middle of a performance.

=== Voicing harpsichord plectra ===
The plectra of a harpsichord must be cut precisely, in a process called "voicing". A properly voiced plectrum will pluck the string in a way that produces a good musical tone and matches well in loudness with all of the other strings. The underside of the plectrum must be appropriately slanted and entirely smooth, so that the jack will not "hang" (get caught on the string) when, after sounding a note, it is moved back down below the level of the string.

Normally, voicing is carried out by inserting the plectrum into the jack, then placing the jack on a small wooden voicing block, so that the top of the plectrum sits flush with the block. The plectrum is then cut and thinned on the underside with a small, very sharp knife, such as an X-Acto knife. As the plectrum is progressively trimmed, its jack is replaced in the instrument at intervals to test the result for loudness, tone quality, and the possibility of hanging.

Voicing is a refined skill, carried out fluently by professional builders, but one that usually must also be learned (at least to some degree) by harpsichord owners.

== See also ==
- Crosspicking
- Flatpicking
- Guitar pick
- Hybrid picking
- Mezrab (plectrum)
- String instrument
