= Aristidis Moschos =

Aristidis Moschos Αριστείδης Μόσχος
- Born: 1930; Agrinio, Greece
- Died: 8 November 2001 (aged 70–71); Athens, Greece
- Genres: Greek Folk Music
- Instrument: santouri
- Years active: 1952–2001

Aristeidis Moschos (Greek: Αριστείδης Μόσχος; 1930 – 8 November 2001) was a Greek player and teacher of the musical instrument known as the santouri.

== Biography ==
Moschos was born in Agrinio, a city in the Aitoloakarnania district. He was the fifth in a family of ten children, and his family was originally from the village of Pentalofos near Agrinio. His father owned a large amount of land in the region which he sold, then moved to Agrinio with his family, and opened two coffee houses.

In one of the coffee houses, musicians from Constantinople, Smyrna, and Armenia used to perform, while the other had a European orchestra. His father was gifted with a clarino player that he used to play traditional Greek as well as other European music, and his brother played the violin. The family's cafés were visited by some of the most prominent 20th-century Greek musicians, including Rita Abatzi, Marika Politissa, and Roza Eskenazi. Aristidis Moschos first heard the santouri played by a Romanian musical group and came to love the instrument.

Moschos' first teacher was a member of the Romanian group, Nestoras Batsi. He quickly learned how to play and started appearing in his father's coffee houses. After World War II, he left Agrinio and went to Athens where he attended the Greek Lyceum.

Moschos toured all over the world with the Lyceum and collaborated with many singers, musicians, and actors. He made many radio and television broadcasts of modern and folk music. He also released fifteen records, of which three became gold and two became platinum. In addition, he participated as a soloist in around 150 other records.

In 1985, Moschos ran the Traditional Music People's School which functioned as a nonprofit company, where he taught several musical instruments as well as Byzantine Music. He was honoured by several municipalities and organizations as well as the Greek Parliament.

Moschos died on 8 November 2001.
