= Kourosh Zolani =

Iranian-American musician

- Born: 1970 (age 55–56)
- Origin: Iran
- Genres: Contemporary world
- Occupations: Composer; soloist
- Instrument: santur
- Years active: 2000–present
- Website: Official Website

Kourosh Zolani (born 1970) is an Iranian-American composer and instrumental soloist. He is known for designing and playing a chromatic santour. His compositions based on using his unique chromatic Santour include Memoirs of Sangesar, Dance of Change and Peaceful Planet. (Note: Other works include: It Used to be Home, Concerto for Santour and Orchestra, With us Forever, Shabnam, Dandelions, Didar, My Childhood Dream, Victory, Snow Queen, Dreams Are Real, Butterflies and Goodbye Homeland)

== Personal life ==
Zolani was the youngest of ten children was raised in a poverty-stricken home in the small village of Sangesar, Iran. From an early age, he had dreamed of being a musician in spite of having to work hard alongside his siblings to make ends meet.

Zolani developed a passion for musical expression and learned to play the santour at age 14 and left home as a young adult to pursue his passion at the University of Art in Tehran. He studied classical composition and trained with Master Farāmarz Pāyvar.

== Professional background ==
Zolani is known for the development of a new tuning technique for the santour, which is an ancient Iranian instrument. The traditional Iranian santour is a diatonic instrument, which is relative to playing a piano without the use of the black keys. Zolani enhanced the instrument by creating a chromatic santour, which essentially allows the use of both black and white keys. Over the history of the Persian santour, unsuccessful attempts had been made to create a chromatic santour, but the enhanced instrument remained in experimental phases, never becoming functional. Zolani's change and enhancement of the santour was an historical first in the presentation and playing capabilities of the instrument. The transformation allowed for more chromatic and complex orchestral versatility.

Since 1995, Zolani has performed his original compositions in concerts in Washington, D.C., as well as the ancient Roman city of Jerash in Jordan, featuring his new chromatic santour. He participated as a santour player in David Arkenstone's Atlantis album, which received a Grammy Award nomination for the Best New Age Album of the Year.

In November 2009, Zolani released a collection of his original work, entitled Memoirs of Sangesar. In 2004, his album, Peaceful Planet was awarded the Best Solo Instrumental Album of the Year in the Just Plain Folks Music Organization's International Contest. He has also received The Elaine Weissman Los Angeles Treasures Award from The City of Los Angeles Cultural Affairs Department and The California Traditional Music Society.

== Discography ==
- 2009 Memoirs of Sangesar
- 2003 Peaceful Planet

== Footnotes ==
- Link to the English translation of the article "Conversation with Kourosh Zolani about Chromatic Santour" in Iran Newspaper. Link to the article in Persian.
