= Tasos Diakogiorgis =

Tasos Diakogiorgis Τάσος Διακογιώργης
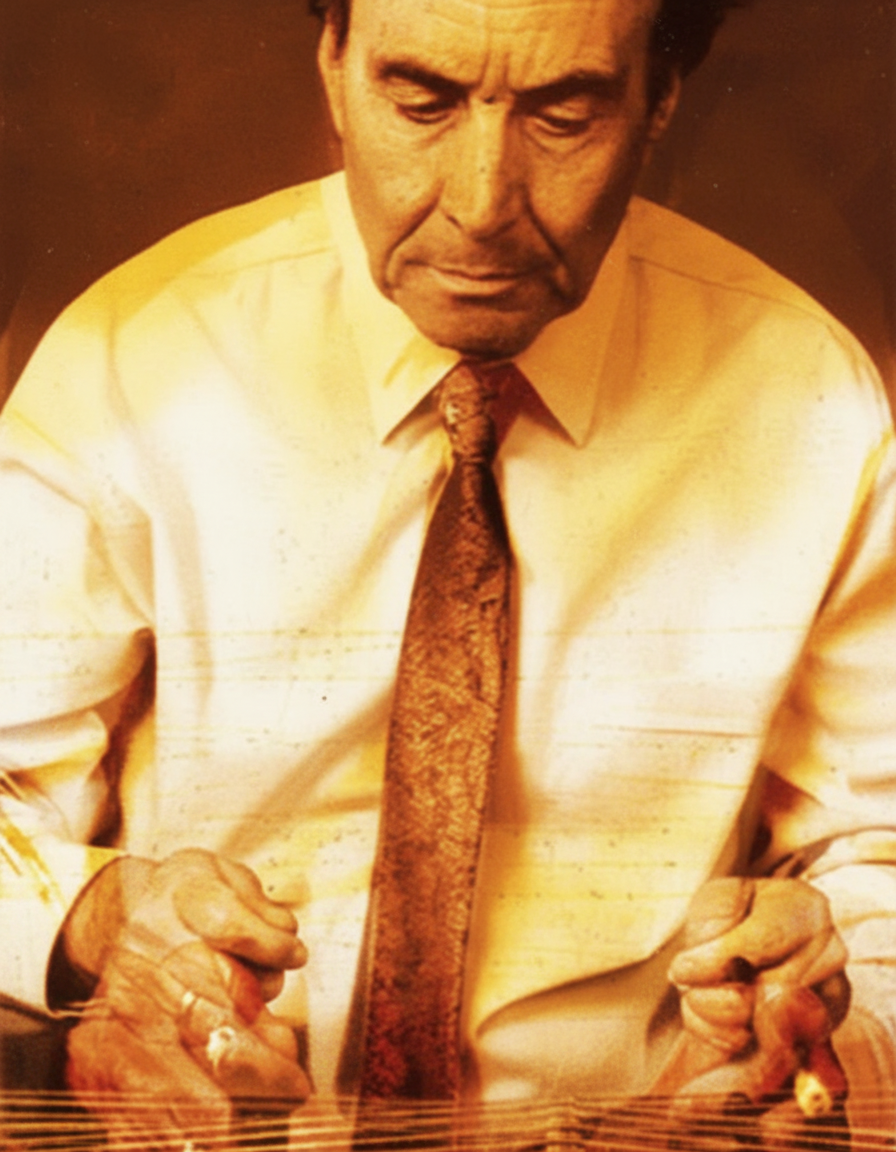
- Diakogiorgis performing in 1999.

Background information
- Born: Anastasios Diakogiorgis; 1924; Maritsa, Rhodes
- Died: 12 March 2007 (aged 82–83) Athens, Greece
- Genres: Folk; Classical
- Occupation: Musician
- Instruments: Greek santur Percussion; Violin
- Years active: 1936–2001

Tasos "Anastasios" Diakogiorgis (Greek: Τάσος Διακογιώργης; 1924, Maritsa – 12 March 2007, Athens) was a Greek santurist, percussionist, and violinist. He is regarded as one of the greatest Greek santurists of all time.

== Biography ==
Tasos Diakogiorgis was born in 1924 in Maritsa, a village of Rhodes. At the age of 10, began to study music and from 1939 to 1941 was attending violin lessons at the National Conservatory of Rhodes.

In 1954 moved to Athens to participate at the Dora Stratou Greek Dances Theatre as a soloist and study percussion with Vasilios Sozopoulos and music theory with Manolis Kalomiris and Leonidas Zoras.

In 1962 Nikos Koundouros introduced him to Yannis Markopoulos. After this, he became a member of the ensemble that recorded the music of the film Young Aphrodites.

In 1964 he acceded to the ERT Contemporary Music Orchestra and ERT National Symphony Orchestra subsequently, which he remained until 1989.

Diakogiorgis died on 12 March 2007, in Athens.
