= Mehdi Barkeshli =

Iranian physicist and musician (1912–1988)

- مهدی برکشلی
- Born: 1912
- Died: 19 January 1988 (aged 75–76)
- Education: PhD in Acoustic Sciences
- Alma mater: Kharazmi University, Sorbonne University, Aix-Marseille University
- Occupations: Musician, Physicist
- Writing career
- Notable work: Presenting Iranian music intervals

Mehdi Barkeshli (Persian: مهدی برکشلی) (1912 – 19 January 1988) was an Iranian musician, composer, violinist, and researcher in the field of theoretical music and its physical foundations who presented the physical coordinates of the ratios of specific intervals in Iranian music.

== Education ==
Mehdi Barkeshli was born in 1912 to a religious family in Tehran. he received his primary education at Tofigh Elementary School and completed his secondary education at Sharaf High School in 1913. His first music teacher was Esmaeil Zarrinfar, who taught him the violin (in Iranian music) for two years.

At the age of 21, at the suggestion of Mahmoud Hesabi, he completed his bachelor's degree in physics and chemistry at the scientific branch of the Higher Teachers' College (later part of the University of Tehran) and taught at the Dar al-Fonun and Tharwat high schools. During this time, barkeshli continued to study the theoretical and practical aspects of music with Ali-Naqi Vaziri and while familiarizing himself with his new theory of Iranian music, he learned to play the violin and work with an orchestra. he was the only one to receive a high school diploma from the Vaziri private music school.

He also worked as a violinist and composer in the National Music Lovers' Association Orchestra, founded by Ruhollah Khaleqi in 1944.he also studied introductory Iranian chamber music under Abolhasan Saba.

In 1946, barkeshli was sent to France with a group of others to continue his studies. In Paris, in addition to studying at the International Center for Educational Studies, he studied physics at the Sorbonne University, graduating at the age of 37 with a state doctorate in science. he also worked for a while at the French National Center for Scientific Research (C.N.R.S.) in the field of acoustics, and in 1953 he received a doctorate in acoustics from the Aix-Marseille University.

During this time, due to the commonality between physics and music in the field of sounds and vibrations, he devoted himself to understanding the physical coordinates of pitch and other scientific aspects of music. he also researched and wrote on the history and characteristics of traditional Iranian music and the works of ancient Iranian musicians. he recorded his knowledge of the "row" of music on thirty gramophone records (78 rpm) at the National Recording Studio in Paris. these records are not available in Iran.

== Return to Iran ==
After returning to Iran, in 1955, he was the educational inspector of the Ministry of Culture (later renamed the Ministry of Education) and presented plans for the development of the Directorate General of Fine Arts, such as the establishment of the National Organization of Iranian Folklore and the National House of Voice, and the establishment of a higher musicology course at the National Conservatory of Music.

After that, he worked at the University of Tehran in the Physics Department of the Faculty of Science, teaching courses such as heat, mechanics, electromagnetism, modern physics, acoustics, and other disciplines. In the early 1970s, he was appointed as the head of the Physics Department of the Faculty of Science.

He has written more than forty articles in the fields of acoustics, music, and science education, including 23 articles in English and French and more than twenty articles in Persian, eleven works in the fields of physics, mechanics, radiography, and music, and four translations and commentaries on ancient texts in the field of music.

== Death ==
Barkeshli died on the morning of 19 January 1988, and was buried in the cemetery of Imamzadeh Abdollah, Ray.
