= Hybrid picking =

Guitar-playing technique

Example of a simple arpeggio with hybrid picking: bass notes flatpicked and higher notes fingerpicked

Hybrid picking is a guitar-playing technique that involves picking with a pick (plectrum) and one or more fingers alternately or simultaneously. Hybrid picking allows guitar players who use a pick to perform music which would normally require fingerstyle playing. It also facilitates wide string leaps (e.g. from the sixth string to the second string, etc.) which might otherwise be quite difficult. The technique is not widespread in most genres of guitar playing (though notable exceptions exist), but is most often employed in "chicken pickin'"; rockabilly, country, honky-tonk, and bluegrass flatpicking styles who play music which occasionally demands fingerstyle passages.

Hybrid picking involves playing with the pick and the right hand m and/or a fingers...at the same time. The pick is held in the usual way...and the fingers execute free strokes in the typical fingerstyle manner...Hybrid picking allows fingerstyle-like passages to be freely interspersed with flatpicked passages...without any delay.

Generally the pick is used to play bass notes, which are emphasized by increased amplitude, longer duration, and timbral difference. In notation the flatpicked notes are indicated by placing the down bow and up bow symbols (𝆪 and 𝆫) below or next to the notehead of the flatpicked note rather than above the staff or tablature as a whole.

== Technique ==
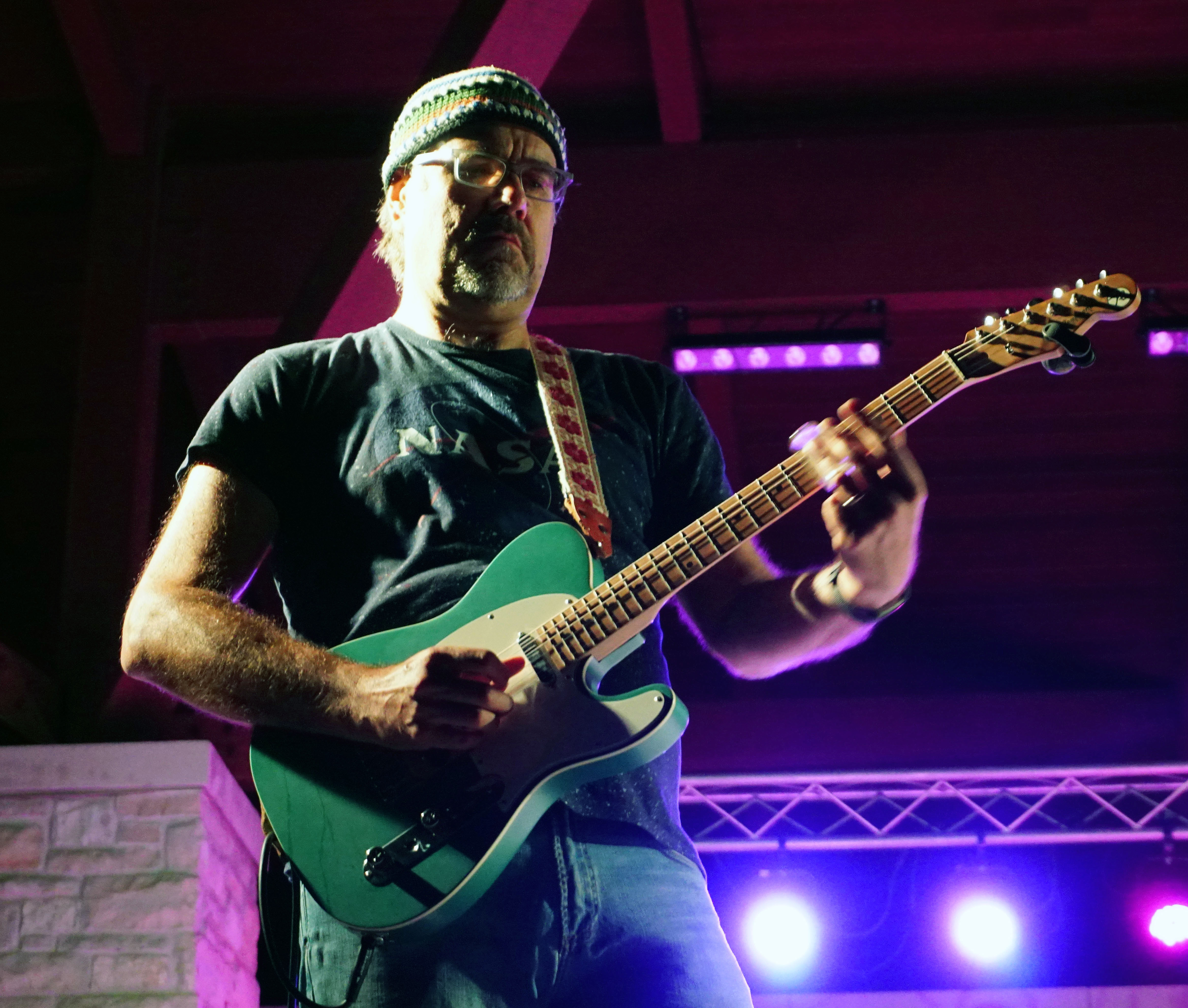
Greg Koch using a hybrid picking style with pick

Hybrid picking involves using a combination of the pick and the fingers. Hold the pick between your thumb and index finger, and use your middle and ring fingers to pluck additional strings...[Generally], pick the bass notes with the pick, and pluck the highe[r] two strings with your middle and ring finger.

Players who use hybrid picking generally hold the pick in the traditional grip, between the index finger and thumb. Since this only involves the use of two fingers, it leaves three fingers of the picking hand free, which allows for hybrid picking.

[Hybrid picking is] the use of both a pick and fingers to pluck the strings. This can be accomplished with a standard flatpick and fingers or with a thumbpick and fingers...With hybrid picking, you don't change the way you operate for normal picking at all. You're only going to add to that with the middle and ring fingers of your picking hand.

Hybrid picking allows a picking guitarist to play some things otherwise impossible; however, there are limitations to the technique. The primary issue stems from the angle at which the free fingers must pick the strings. While a player who only uses his or her fingers to pluck the strings (e.g., a classical guitarist) holds their hand at such an angle that the fingers travel perpendicular to the strings, allowing for a clear attack, a player holding the pick naturally positions their hand such that the pick strikes perpendicular to the strings, putting the fingers in a position almost parallel to the strings. This makes the attack of the free fingers of a hybrid picking guitarist considerably weaker than that of a purely fingerpicking guitarist, unless significant changes are made to the hybrid picker's hand position. The angle of the fingers for a hybrid picker also limits the speed at which fingerpicked notes can be played, though speed can be achieved as normal using the plectrum. The timbre of fingerpicked notes is described as, "result[ing] in a more piano-like attack," and less like pizzicato.

How pseudo-hybrid picking looks like when played on an Epiphone ES-335.

There is also a rare variation of hybrid picking known as pseudo-hybrid picking, in which there is no plectrum used at all and the thumb is pressed against the index finger (the nail of which acts as the plectrum) to pick the one of the 3 lower strings (E, A and D), with the other 3 fingers being used to simultaneously pluck the higher strings (G, B and E). However, there is a subtype of this already seldom used technique that is known by the same name, though the technique is different.

In this technique, the index fingernail is used by the player as a plectrum on any of the strings at a given point, but then the player switches to pure fingerstyle (p-i-m-a or p-i-m-a-c) rather than using just the index fingernail. This is a very useful technique in jazz guitar, jazz fusion guitar and other music genres that demand quick switches from pure fingerstyle chord voicings to rapid solos dynamically or for musicians that simply do not want to use a pick for comfort or ergonomics reasons.

In some cases, pseudo-hybrid picking or its subtype may be considered to be a form of fingerstyle, though that is up for debate, as the techniques have significant overlap. However, classical purists or fingerstyle experts may not consider this "true fingerstyle" as the index finger would still be simulating a pick.

== See also ==
- Alternate picking
- Fingerstyle guitar
- Guitar picking
- Jazz guitar
