= Faramarz Payvar =

Iranian composer and santur player

Farāmarz Pāyvar
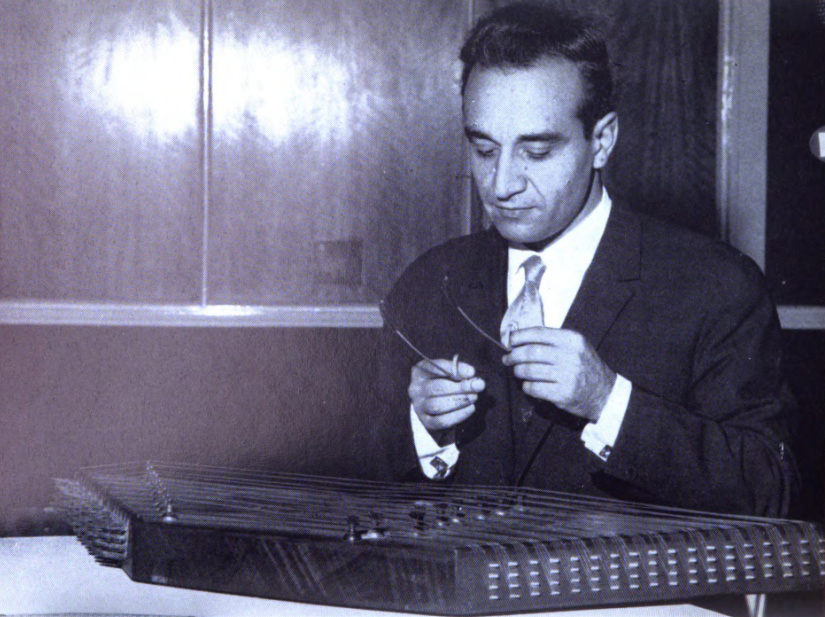
- Born: Farâmarz Pâyvar; 10 February 1933; Tehran, Iran
- Died: 9 December 2009 (aged 76); Tehran, Iran
- Occupations: composer, Santur player

Farâmarz Pâyvar (Persian: فرامرز پایور, pronounced [fæɾɒːˈmæɹz pʰɒːjˈvæɾ]; 10 February 1933 – 9 December 2009) was an Iranian composer and santur player. Payvar died on 9 December 2009 after a long struggle with brain damage. Although once perceived as marginal, the santur is now considered an important solo instrument in Persian classical music, largely as a result of his work. Over the course of his career, Payvar revolutionised its playing, led two major ensembles and made numerous recordings.

== Career ==
He also published several books on practical and theoretical aspects of Iranian classical music. These included a series of influential guides on how to play the santur, and a popular manual for the tar, a long-necked lute said to embody the spirit of Iranian music.

Payvar was renowned for his strict personal discipline and demanded the same of his students as well as members of his ensembles. This meant that their line-ups hardly altered at all, in contrast with the volatile changes that affected other contemporary Persian groups.

He founded his own school of performance for the santur, with a novel emphasis on arpeggiated figures reflecting an openness to "Western" influence. Another innovation that caused controversy among some traditionalists was his use of felt on the hammers used to strike the instrument's strings. This resulted in a softer, less metallic tone that was suggestive of the piano – itself thought to have been derived from the santur.

Before the 1979 Iranian Revolution and after the end of the Iran-Iraq War, Payvar travelled internationally as a cultural ambassador for Persian music, performing in North America, Great Britain, Continental Europe, various Soviet Republics and, Japan. During the 1960s and 1970s he recorded a number of albums for French labels. Among his albums still available are two volumes devoted to the works of tar player Darvish Khan, as well as Iran: Persian Classical Music, for the Elektra Nonesuch label, 972060-2, which was recorded on a 1973 tour of America and featured the female singer Khatareh Parvaneh.

Faramarz Payvar was born in 1933 in Tehran to a wealthy family. Both his father and grandfather played santur and violin, and were associated with the great musicians of their eras.

By the age of 17, Payvar had begun formal music study with the maestro Abolhasan Saba. It took him six years to master the radif – the complete repertoire of Persian classical music. Following this, he was able to perform alongside his teacher on the Iranian National Radio, taking part in a groundbreaking series of programmes. These are being conserved in the second decade of second millennium AD as the Golha Project, supported by the British Library and the School of Oriental and African Studies.

After doing his military service in 1952, Payvar began working for the Iranian Ministry of Finance, and started teaching at the College for National Music, but in 1955 he moved to the Ministry of Education. By 1959 he had founded the nine-member National Instrumental Orchestra of the Ministry of Arts and Culture.

In 1963, Payvar won a scholarship to study for three years in England, where he met his Irish-American first wife. During this time, he also lectured on and performed Persian classical music in London and Cambridge.

On his return to Iran in 1966, he founded his second group, the five-member Goruhe Asātid ("Ensemble of Maestros"). Both of his groups began performing on Iranian TV and giving concerts at Tehran's new Rudaki Concert Hall.

They were often featured at the international Shiraz Arts Festival, which ran from 1967 to 1977, but it became one of several cultural casualties of the looming Islamic Revolution. The Ministry of Art and Culture followed suit, as did Payvar's associated group, which had by then changed its name to the Payvar Ensemble. With the exception of "revolutionary anthems", music was completely banned in Iran from 1979 and all through the Iran-Iraq war, which ended in 1988. However, Payvar continued to teach privately during this period, and when the ban was lifted in 1989, he performed the first public concert at Rudaki Hall.

Payvar's first marriage had ended due to the "complications" that resulted from being married to a foreigner after the revolution. While visiting his daughter (and only child) from that union in Paris in 1998, he suffered a stroke that paralysed one side of his body and forced him to give up performing. Although severely disabled, he continued to mentor younger musicians from his home till the end of his life.

Farâmarz Pâyvar, who died in Tehran on 9 December 2009, was married twice. He is survived by his second wife and his daughter.

== Works ==
Concertino for Santur and Orchestra, by Faramarz Payvar and Hossein Dehlavi.

- Concertino for santūr and Orchestra (Pâyvar-Dehlavi) (1958)
- The Radif of Sabâ for Santur in three volumes by F. Pâyvar and Dâryuš Safvat (FerdowsiPublication, Tehran) (1958)
- Dialogue (Goftegu), duet for Santur and violin (1959)
- Preliminary book in Santur playing (Mâhur Publication, Tehran) (1960)
- Thirty Câhârmezrâb for the Santur (Department of Art and Culture Publication, Tehran) (1971)
- The second book of the Radif of Sabā for Santur by F. Pāyvar and Dāryūš Safvat (Ferdowsi Publication, Tehran) (1974)
- Eight musical pieces for the Santur (Department of Art and Culture Publication, Tehran) (1979)
- Parniyân, duet for Santur and Târ (1980)
- Radif Chapkuk for Santur (in women's voice registration) for the santur (1981)
- A collection of pišdarâmad and Rengs (1981)
- A collection of pišdarâmad and Rengs (arranged for the violin) (1982)
- Chamber music for Santur (1982)
- Fânus, duet for two Santurs (1982)
- Theory of Western and Iranian music (1983)
- Renge šahrâšub (1984)
- Elementary Radif for Santur (1988)
- Rahgozar, duet for santur and flute (Otâqe Câp Publication, Tehran) (1989)
- The Vocal Radif and old Tasnifs, according to the version of Abdollah Davami, Collected by F. Pāyvar. (Mâhur Publication, Tehran) (1998)
- Santur Courses, Radif of Maestro Abolhassan Saba, compiled and edited by Farâmarz Pâyvar, rewritten by Pejman Azarmina (1999, ISBN 964-6409-39-3)
- Fâlguš, seven pieces for Santur (Mâhur Publication, Tehran) (2000) – Computerized Textual Note by: Masoud Gharibzadeh

== Partial discography ==
- Improvisation in dašti and afšâri, F. Pâyvar, santur and H. Tehrâni, Tombak.
- Album Yâdegâri (the memorial album) in dastgâhs šur and segâh, F. Pâyvar, santur and M. Esmâ’ili, Tombak.
- Goftegu (dialogue), duets for santur and other instruments composed by F. Pâyvar
- In memorial of Habib Samai, F. Pâyvar, Santur solo in dastgâhs šur and câhârgâh.
- Dašti concert. Pâyvar ensemble and Šajariyân (vocal)
- Dele Šeyda, Pâyvar Ensemble (Masters of Classical Persian Music) and Šâhram Nâzeri (vocals).
- Layli & Majnun, Pâyvar Ensemble (Masters of Classical Persian Music) and Šâhram Nâzeri (vocals).
- Bayâte Kord: F. Pâyvar, santur and H. Tehrani, Tombak in dastgâh Bayâte Kord and solo Tombak in various rhythm improvised by Tehrani.
- Šahrâšub, F. Pâyvar, santur solo in šur, abu atâ and dašti. Mahur.
- Iranian folk music, arranged by F. Pāyvar. Pāyvar Ensemble and Simā Binā (vocal).
- Hekâyate Del, in dastgāh šur. Pâyvar Ensemble with A. Rostamiyân (vocal).
- Mahur and Segâh, Masters Ensemble conducted by F. Pâyvar and Šahidi (vocal).
- Rahâvard, played by Masters, J. Šahnâz, târ, M. Esmâ’ili, Tombak, and F. Pâyvar, Santur.
- Kerešme, in dastgâhs segâh and afšâri, played by Pâyvar Ensemble.
- Iran: Persian Classical Music, from the Nonesuch Explorer Series
