= Santur =

Hammered dulcimer of Iranian origin

String
- Classification: Stringed, Struck

Playing range
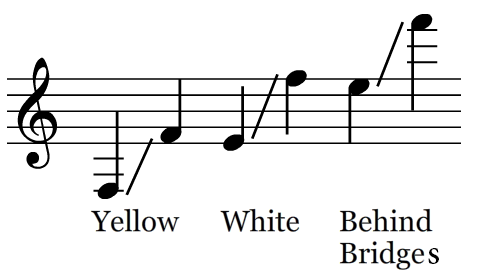

Related instruments
- Hammered dulcimer

Sound sample
- Sadeghi-Dehlavi-Concertino for Santur by Faramarz Payvar

The santur (Note: Also santour or santoor.) (English: san-TOOR /sænˈtuɹ/ Persian: سنتور [sænˈt̪ʰuːɹ]) is a hammered dulcimer of Iranian origin.

== History ==
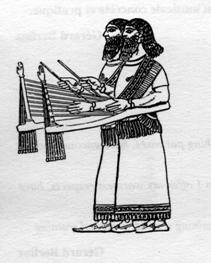
- The archetype of the instrument carried horizontally and struck with two sticks, found in iconographical documents in ancient Babylon (1600–911 BCE) and Neo-Assyria (911–612 BCE).

String instrument
- Classification: Struck

Related instruments
- Qanun

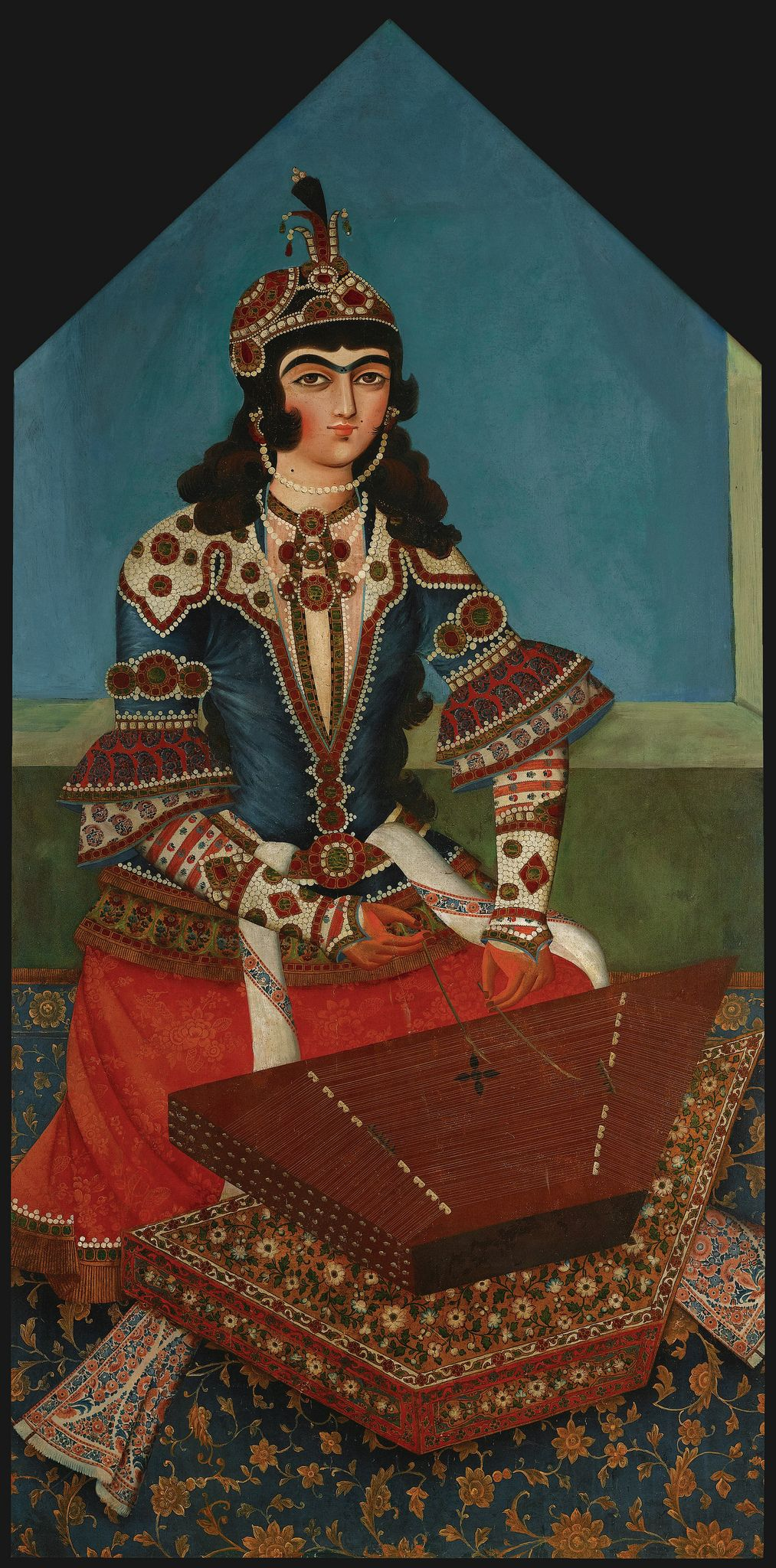
Woman playing a santur, early 19th century, in Qajar Iran

The santur was invented and developed in Persia and its region. The earliest sign of it coming from Assyrian and Babylonian stone carvings (669 BCE); it shows the instrument being played while hanging from the player's neck.

This instrument traveled and developed in different regions of the Middle East. Musicians modified the original design over the centuries, yielding a wide array of musical scales and tunings. The first santurs were probably made of wood, perhaps with stone elements, and goat gut strings.

According to Habib Hasan Touma, the Babylonian santur was the ancestor of the harp, the yangqin, the harpsichord, the qanun, the cimbalom, and the hammered dulcimers.

== Name ==
The name 'santur' comes from Persian sanṭīr, related to the Greek ψαλτήριον 'psalterion'. The Biblical Aramaic form psantērīn is found in the Book of Daniel 3:5.

== Description ==
The oval-shaped mezrabs (mallets) are feather-weight and are held between the thumb, index, and middle fingers. A typical Persian santur has two sets of nine bridges, providing a range of approximately three diatonic octaves. The mezrabs are made out of wood with tips that may or may not be wrapped with cotton or felt.

The right-hand strings are made of brass or copper, while the left-hand strings are made of steel.

A total of 18 bridges divide the santur into three positions. Over each bridge cross four strings tuned in unison, spanning horizontally across the right and left side of the instrument. There are three sections of nine pitches: each for the bass, middle, and higher octave called behind the left bridges comprising 27 tones altogether. The top "F" note is repeated twice, creating a total of 25 separate tones on the santur. The Persian santur is primarily tuned to a variety of different diatonic scales utilizing 1/4 tones which are designated into 12 modes (dastgahs) of Persian classical music. These 12 Dastgahs are the repertory of Persian classical music known as the Radif.

== Derivations ==
Similar musical instruments have been present since medieval times all over in Persian-influenced regions, including Armenia, China, Greece, India, etc.

The Indian santoor, directly borrowed from the Persian santoor, is wider and more rectangular and has more strings. Its mallets are also held differently and played with a different technique.

The eastern European version of the santur called the cimbalom, which is much larger and chromatic, is used to accompany Hungarian folk music, Eastern European Jewish music, and Slavic music, as well as Romani music.

== Iraqi santur ==
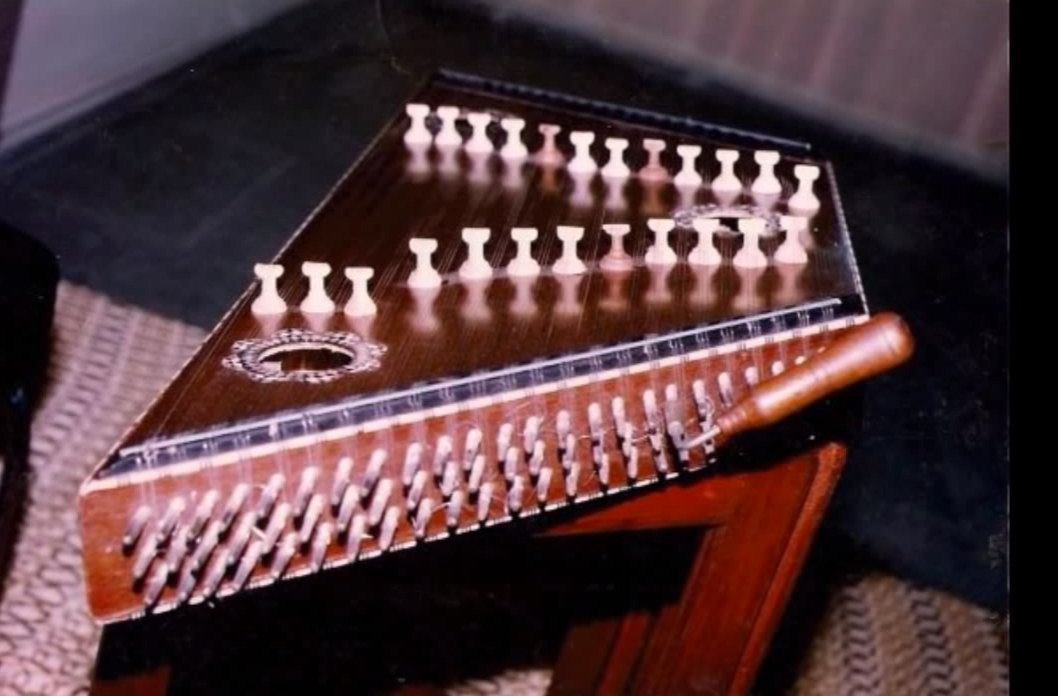
Typical Iraqi santur

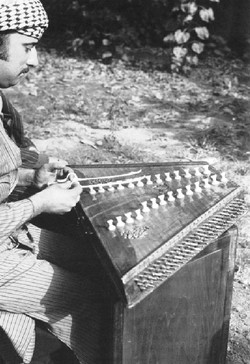
Chalghi santur player playing on a non-standard Iraqi santur

The Iraqi santur (also santour, santoor) (Arabic: سنطور) is a hammered dulcimer of Mesopotamian origin. It is a trapezoid box zither with a walnut body and 92 steel (or bronze) strings. The strings, tuned to the same pitch in groups of four, are struck with two wooden mallets called "midhrab". The tuning of these 23 sets of strings extends from the lower yakah (G) up to jawab jawab husayni (A). The bridges are called dama ("chessmen" in Iraqi Arabic) because they look like pawns. It is native to Iraq, Syria, India, Pakistan, Turkey, Iran, Greece (the Aegean coasts) and Azerbaijan.

It and the joza are the main instruments used in the classical Iraqi Maqam tradition. The instrument was brought to Europe by the Arabs through North Africa and Spain during the Middle Ages and also to China where it was referred to as the "foreign qin".

The Iraqi santur has, since its inception, been fully chromatic, allowing for full maqam modulations. It uses 12 bridges of steel strings on both sides. Three of these bridges are movable: B half flat qaraar, E half flat, and B half flat jawaab. The non-standard version of the Iraqi santur includes extra bridges so that there's no need to move those three bridges. However, playing it is a bit harder than playing the standard 12-bridge santur.

== Notable players ==
=== Iran ===
- Abol Hassan Saba
- Manoochehr Sadeghi
- Faramarz Payvar
- Mohammad Heydari
- Parviz Meshkatian
- Majid Kiani
- Nasser Rastegar-Nejad
- Mohammad Sadeq Khan
- Ali Akbar Shahi
- Hassan Khan
- Hossein Malek
- Habib Soma’i
- Reza Varzandeh
- Reza Shafieian
- Mansur Sarami
- Masoud Shaari
- Mohammad Santour Khan
- Daryoush Safvat
- Jalal Akhbari
- Pouya Saraei
- Ardavan Kamkar
- Pejman Azarmina
- Pashang Kamkar
- Kourosh Zolani
- Arfa Atrai
- Azar Hashemi
- Susan Aslani
- Manijeh Ali Pour

=== Iraq ===
Notable players of the Iraqi santur include:

- Abdallah Ali (1929–1998)
- Akram Al Iraqi
- Amir ElSaffar
- Azhar Kubba
- Bahir Hashem Al Rajab
- Basil al-Jarrah
- Ghazi Mahsub al-Azzawi
- Hugi Salih Rahmain Pataw (1848–1933)
- Hashim Al Rajab
- Hala Bassam
- Hammudi Ali al-Wardi
- Haj Hashim Muhammad Rajab al-Ubaydi (1921–2003)
- Hendrin Hikmat (b. 1974)
- Heskel Shmuli Ezra (1804–1894)
- Mohamed Abbas
- Muhammad Salih al-Santurchi (18th century)
- Muhammad Zaki Darwish al-Samarra'i (b. 1955)
- Mustafa Abd al-Qadir Tawfiq
- Qasim Muhammad Abd (1969–)
- Rahmatallah Safa'i
- Sa'ad Abd al-Latif al-Ubaydi
- Sabah Hashim
- Saif Walid al-Ubaydi
- Salman Enwiya
- Salman Sha'ul Dawud Bassun (1900–1950)
- Sha'ul Dawud Bassun (19th century)
- Shummel Salih Shmuli (1837–1915)
- Wesam al-Azzawy (b. 1960)
- Yusuf Badros Aslan (1844–1929)
- Yusuf Hugi Pataw (1886–1976)

=== Greece ===
Calamatiano
1924 recording of a Greek folk song that features the playing of a santur

Players of the Greek Santouri include:

- Tasos Diakogiorgis
- Aristidis Moschos

=== India ===
Notable players of the Indian santoor include:

- Ulhas Bapat (1950–2018)
- Tarun Bhattacharya (b. 1957)
- Rahul Sharma (b. 1972)
- Shivkumar Sharma (1938–2022)
- Abhay Sopori
- Bhajan Sopori (1948–2022)
- R. Visweswaran (1944–2007)
- Varsha Agrawal (b. 1967)
- Mohammad Tibet Baqal (1914–1982)
- Harjinder Pal Singh (b. 1953)

=== Germany ===
- Bee Seavers, disciple of Shivkumar Sharma (see above)

== From around the world ==
Versions of the santur or hammered dulcimer are used throughout the world. In Eastern Europe, a larger descendant of the hammered dulcimer called the cimbalom is played and has been used by a number of classical composers, including Zoltán Kodály, Igor Stravinsky, and Pierre Boulez, and more recently, in a different musical context, by Blue Man Group. The khim is the name of both the Thai and the Khmer hammered dulcimer. The Chinese yangqin is a type of hammered dulcimer that originated in Persia. The santur and santoor are found in the Middle East and India, respectively.

- Afghanistan – santur
- Armenian - սանթուր (sant'ur)
- Azerbaijan – santur
- Austria – Hackbrett
- Belarus – цымбалы (tsymbaly)
- Belgium – hakkebord
- Brazil – saltério
- Cambodia – khim
- Catalonia – saltiri
- China – 扬琴 (yangqin)
- Croatian – cimbal, cimbale
- Czech Republic – cimbál
- Denmark – hakkebræt
- France – tympanon
- Germany – Hackbrett
- Greece – santouri
- Hungary – cimbalom
- India – santoor
- Iran – santur
- Iraq – santur
- Ireland – tiompan
- Italy – salterio
- Korea – yanggeum 양금
- Laos – khim
- Latgalia (Latvia) – cymbala
- Latvia – cimbole
- Lithuania – cimbalai, cimbolai
- Mongolia – ёочин yoochin
- Netherlands – hakkebord
- Norway – hakkebrett
- Pakistan – santur
- Poland – cymbały
- Portugal – saltério
- Romania – ţambal
- Russia – цимбалы tsimbaly, дульцимер (dultsimer)
- Serbia – цимбал (tsimbal)
- Slovakia – cimbal
- Slovenia – cimbale, oprekelj
- Spain (and Spanish-speaking countries) – salterio, dulcémele
- Sweden – hackbräde, hammarharpa
- Switzerland – Hackbrett
- Tajikistan – сантур, santur
- Thailand – khim
- Turkey – santur
- Ukraine – цимбали tsymbaly
- United Kingdom – hammered dulcimer
- United States – hammered dulcimer
- Uzbekistan – chang
- Vietnam – đàn tam thập lục (lit. '36 strings')
- Yiddish – tsimbl

== See also ==
- Persian traditional music

== Gallery ==
Santur related pictures

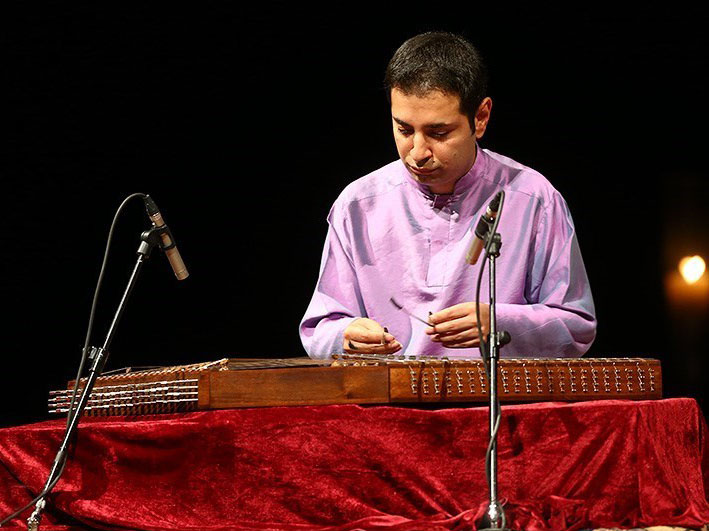
Ali Bahrami-Fard playing in Vahdat Hall

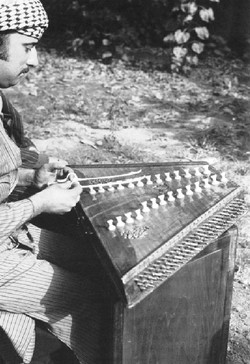
Chalghi santur player playing on a non-standard Iraqi santur

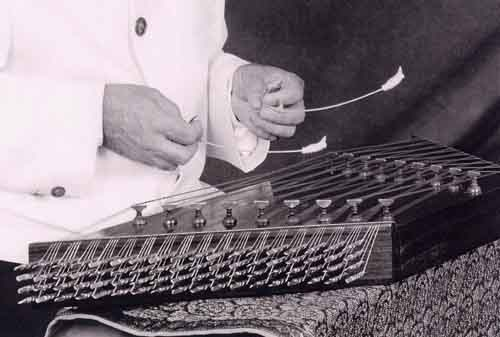
Santur hand position

Santur technique

== Bibliography ==
- Al-Hanafi, Jalal (1964). Al-Mughannūn al-Baghdādīyyūn wa al-Maqām al-ʻIrāqī. Baghdad: Wizarat al-Irshad.
- Touma, Habib Hassan (1996). The Music of the Arabs, trans. Laurie Schwartz. Portland, Oregon: Amadeus Press. ISBN 0-931340-88-8.
- Children's Book of Music ISBN 978-0-7566-6734-4
