= Flatpicking =

Playing technique on the guitar

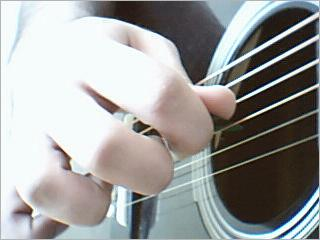

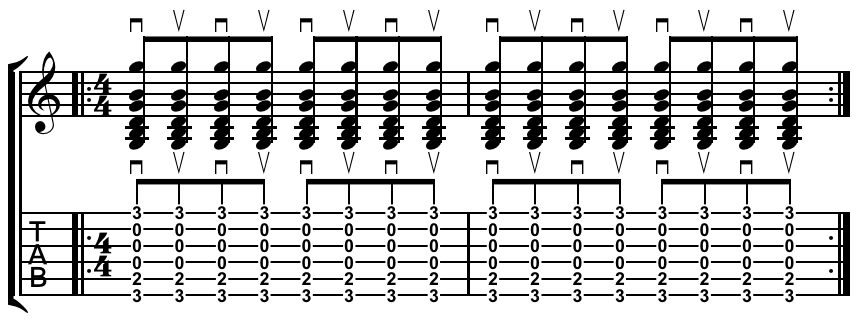
Guitar strum, with down and up strums indicated

Flatpicking (or simply picking) is the technique of striking the strings of a guitar with a pick (also called a plectrum) held between the thumb and one or two fingers. It can be contrasted to fingerstyle guitar, which is playing with individual fingers, with or without wearing fingerpicks. While the use of a plectrum is common in many musical traditions, the exact term "flatpicking" is most commonly associated with Appalachian music of the American southeastern highlands, especially bluegrass music, where string bands often feature musicians playing a variety of styles, both fingerpicking and flatpicking. Musicians who use a flat pick in other genres such as rock and jazz are not commonly described as flatpickers or even plectrum guitarists. As the use of a pick in those traditions is commonplace, generally only guitarists who play without a pick are noted by the term "fingerpicking" or "fingerstyle".

Probably starting around 1930, flatpicking in American music was developed when guitarists began arranging old-time American fiddle tunes on the guitar, expanding the instrument's traditional role of rhythm guitar accompaniment with an occasional run on the bass strings. Although early guitarists such as Riley Puckett used a thumb pick to emphasize bass notes, this part of the style was adapted into flatpicking.

The melodic style in bluegrass is often fast and dynamic, with slides, hammer-ons, pull-offs, powerful strumming and rapid crosspicking. Bluegrass flatpickers usually prefer guitars with a flat top rather than an arch top, and steel strings rather than nylon.

== Early styles ==
Flatpick style guitar began largely with techniques in rhythm guitar, chiefly in early country, and Old Time string band music. Guitarists like Riley Puckett pioneered this early flatpicking by adding quick, complex runs to backup rhythm guitar. By the late 1920s, guitarists like Roy Harvey and Johnny Crockett began using flatpicking techniques for lead guitar, often with significant influence from Ragtime, Jazz and Swing styles. Through the 1930s, the Delmore Brothers would greatly pioneer the development of flatpicking guitar with rapid picking and melody based leads. Around this time, plectrum based banjo styles played on tenor banjos became popular especially in Ragtime and Dixieland Jazz, but they are not commonly known as flatpicking. This style can be typified by players such as Eddie Peabody. One could say flatpicking was part of Bluegrass music at its start, considering Bill Monroe played guitar on the first two songs he recorded with the Bluegrass Boys and even incorporated a flatpick lead intro on the Muleskinner Blues.

== Post War Era ==
By the mid-1940s, the Boogie had become a heavy influence on Country music prompting the Delmore Brothers to release a number of boogie inspired songs featuring both acoustic and electric flatpicking styles. In 1945, Arthur Smith recorded his hit flatpick guitar instrumental "Guitar Boogie", which would influence many guitarists in Country and Rock and Roll music alike. Don Reno though more known for his Banjo playing, is often credited for being the first flatpick guitarist in Bluegrass music as well as the first to play fiddle tunes on the guitar. Reno had the most profound impact of the early bluegrass flatpickers and built heavily on both complex melodic lead techniques as well as rhythm backup. Hank Snow pioneered the usage of acoustic lead guitar in contemporary Country Music, and flatpicking even found its way into the electric stylings of rockabilly through pioneers like Johnny Bond, Hank Garland, and Joe Maphis. Guitarists like Bill Napier, Edd Mayfield, and Bill Clifton also became prominent in bluegrass flatpicking styles at this time.

== 1960s ==
Flatpicking techniques and styles were built upon heavily in the 1960s by guitarists like Doc Watson, Clarence White, and George Shuffler. Watson and White both legitimized the acoustic guitar as a lead instrument in bluegrass and old-time country music. White brought guitar flatpicking to the forefront of bluegrass, while Watson brought flatpicking to folk audiences as he played fiddle tunes, blues, country, and gospel songs throughout America. Shuffler played guitar for the Stanley Brothers and heavily incorporated crosspicking into his lead styles. Flatpick rhythm guitar techniques continued to be advanced through artists like Jimmy Martin and Charlie Waller (American musician).

== 1970s–1980s ==
Building on the contributions of Doc Watson, Clarence White, and Don Reno, artists such as Norman Blake, Dan Crary, John Carlini, Mark O'Connor, Russ Barenberg, Larry Sparks, François Vola and Tony Rice further developed the art of flatpicking. Rice likely had the most profound impact on bluegrass guitar playing of anyone since his musical hero, Clarence White. Rice's tone, rhythm, phrasing, and improvisational skills have influenced an entire generation of bluegrass guitarists. Important elements Rice has used in his playing are jazz type chord substitutions, different from the straight major and minor chords common to bluegrass, and the use of the Dorian mode and the minor pentatonic "blues" scale in his lead playing. While there have been several songs using the Dorian mode in Appalachian roots music, Rice made a different statement by using this scale to improvise during songs written in a major key. For instance, he is very well known for playing an F major scale during a song written in G major (the F major scale, when played from G to G, is a G Dorian mode). The use of this technique introduces the flat 3rd (Bb) and the flat 7th (F) over the G chord which has a unique sound popular in bluegrass.

== 1990s–2000s ==
In recent years, players such as David Grier, Bryan Sutton, Beppe Gambetta and Tim Stafford have carried the guitar into the next millennium. Also, current "young guns" like Ethan J Meier, Cody Kilby, John Chapman, David Rawlings, Chris Eldridge, Andy Falco, Sean Watkins, Billy "Strings" Apostol, Molly Tuttle and Jordan Tice continue to explore this style of guitar playing. These players are still defining new standards and reaching wider audiences. Pioneers like Norman Blake, Russ Barenberg, and Dan Crary continue to produce music featuring flatpicking as well.

The annual US National Flatpicking Championship is held at the Walnut Valley Festival in Winfield, Kansas.

== See also ==
- Lead guitar
