= Outline of guitars =

Overview of and topical guide to guitars

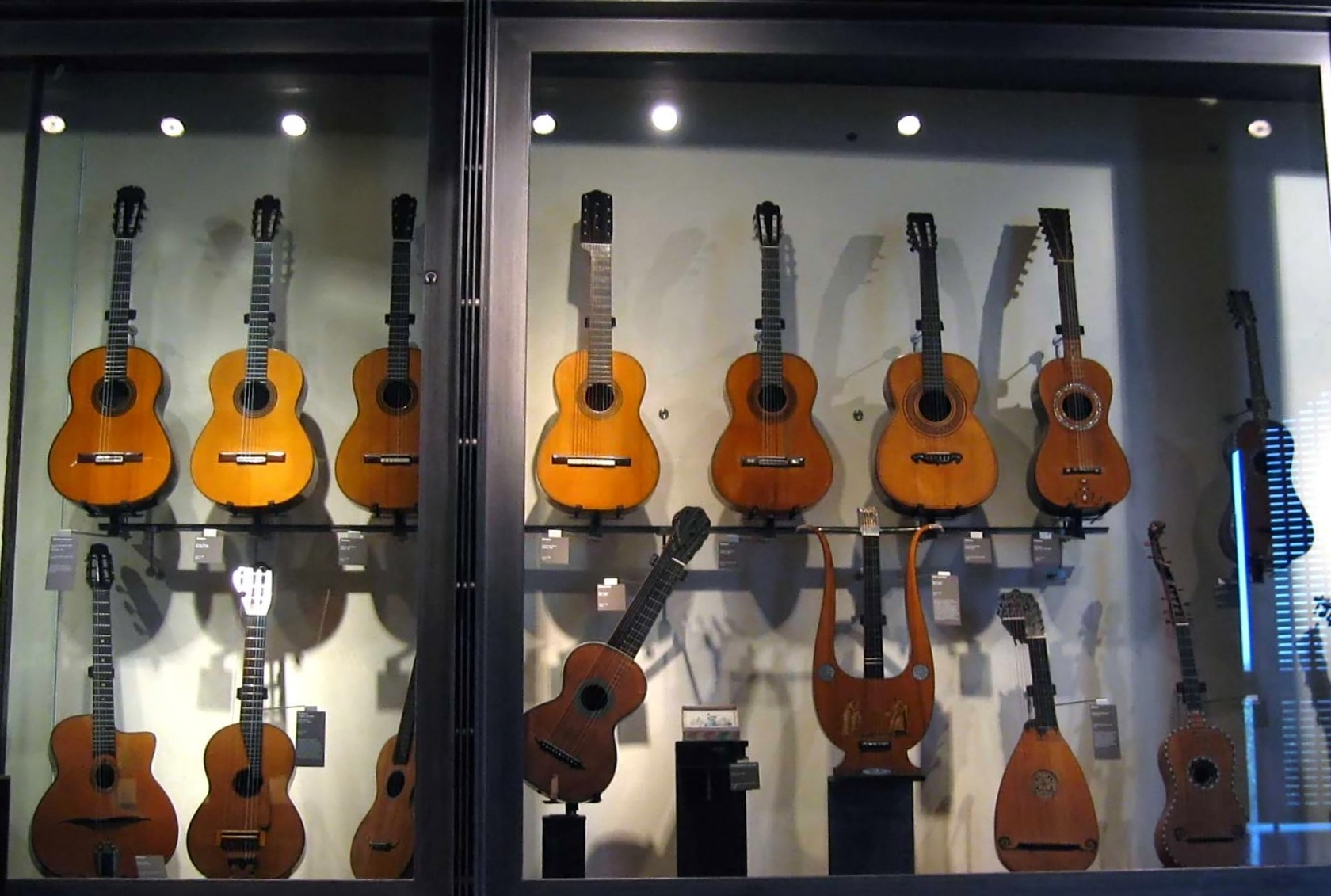
A variety of guitars

The following outline is provided as an overview of and topical guide to guitars:

A guitar is a plucked string instrument, usually played with fingers or a pick. The guitar consists of a body with a rigid neck to which the strings, generally six in number, are attached. Most guitar necks have metal frets attached (the exception is fretless bass guitars). Guitars are traditionally constructed of various woods and strung with animal gut or, more recently, with either nylon or steel strings. Some modern 2010-era guitars are made of polycarbonate materials. Guitars are made and repaired by luthiers. There are two primary families of guitars: acoustic and electric. An acoustic guitar has a wooden top and a hollow body. An electric guitar may be a solid-body or hollow body instrument, which is made louder by using a pickup and plugging it into a guitar amplifier and speaker. Another type of guitar is the low-pitched bass guitar.

== Instrument classification ==
A guitar can be described as all of the following:

- Musical instrument
  - Chordophone – Class of musical instruments with vibrating strings
  - Rhythm section instrument

== Types and varieties of guitars ==
=== Standard guitar variations ===
- Acoustic guitar
- Acoustic-electric guitar
- Archtop guitar
- Classical guitar
- Electric guitar
- Flamenco guitar
- Flat top guitar
- Fretless guitar
- Hybrid guitar
- Parlor guitar
- Resonator guitar
- Selmer guitar (Maccaferri)
- Semi-acoustic guitar
- Silent guitar
- Steel-string acoustic guitar
- Tailed bridge guitar

=== Pitch-based variations ===
- Alto guitar
- Baritone guitar
- Bass guitars
  - Contrabass guitar
  - Acoustic bass guitar
  - Bass guitar
- Niibori guitars
- Octave guitar
- Requinto
- Soprano guitar
- Tenor guitar
- Terz guitar

=== Steel guitars ===
- Lap steel guitar (aka Hawaiian guitar)
- Pedal steel guitar

=== Courses ===
- Single course
- Double course (e.g., 12-string guitar)
- Triple course (e.g. Tiple Colombiano)
- Four or more strings per course (e.g. Guitarron Chileno)

=== Extra strings ===
- Seven-string guitar – Russian guitar and electric guitar
- Eight-string guitar
- Nine-string guitar
- Ten-string guitar
- 11-string guitar
- Twelve-string guitar
- 13-string guitar
- Extended-range bass – Covers bass guitars with 5 or more strings

=== Fewer strings ===
- Three-string guitar
- Four-string guitar
- Five-string guitar

=== Misc ===
- Harp guitar
- Gittler guitar
- Lyre-guitar
- Nano guitar
- Portuguese guitar
- Prepared guitar
- Vintage guitar

== Models ==
=== 6-strings ===
==== Acoustic guitar models ====
- CF Martin & Company Dreadnought
- Gibson J-45
- Ovation Roundback

==== Semi-acoustic models ====
- Gibson ES-335
- Rickenbacker 360 (Both 12-string and 6-string models)
- Gretsch White Falcon

==== Solid body electric models ====
- Fender Stratocaster
- Fender Telecaster
- Gibson Les Paul
- Gibson SG
- Gibson Flying V
- Superstrat
- Steinberger
- PRS
- Red SpecialBrian May

=== Bass guitars ===
Bass guitars are also called "electric basses".

- Fender Jazz Bass
- Fender Precision Bass
- Violin Bass
- Alembic Bass

== Parts ==
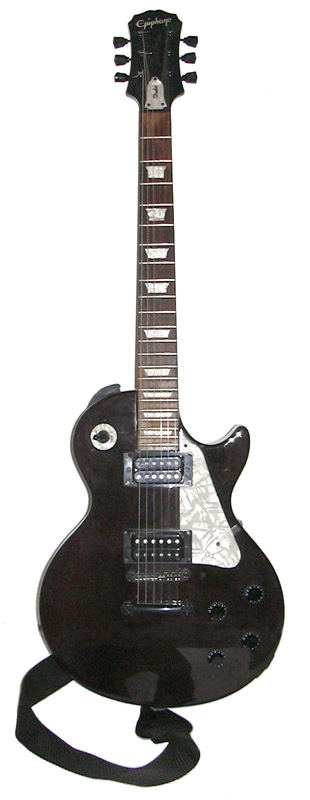
An Epiphone Les Paul electric guitar

- Body: The solid body of an electric and the hollow sound box of an acoustic
- Bridge
- Fingerboard (fretboard)
- Frets
- Wiring and electronics (including volume and tone controls)
- Headstock (peghead, head)
- Inlay
- Machine heads (tuners)
- Neck
- Neck joint: see Set-in neck, Bolt-on neck and Neck-thru
- Nut
- Pickguard
- Pickup (Electric – Single coil (including P-90), Humbucker) (Acoustic – Piezoelectric)
- Sound board (Acoustic)
- Strings
- Truss rod

== Guitar accessories ==
=== Miscellaneous ===
- Capo
- Guitar pick
- Fingerpick
- Neck-thru-body
- Slide
- Vibrato systems for guitar ("Tremolo arm")
- Electronic tuner
- Patch cord (Electric, some acoustics)

=== Guitar amplifiers ===
Guitar amplifier

- Distortion (guitar)
- Power attenuator (guitar)
- Preamplifier
- Stack: A guitar amplification setup consisting of one or more speaker cabinets and a "head" (amplifier), rather than a self-contained unit.

=== Guitar effects ===
Effects unit (also known as "Stomp Box")

- Compression (electric guitar)
- Chorus effect
- Delay (audio effect)
- Fuzz (electric guitar)
- Flange (electric guitar)
- Phaser (electric guitar)
- Reverb (Reverberation)
- Sustain
  - Infinite guitar
- Ebow
- Overdrive/distortion terms
  - Brown sound
  - Crunch
  - Gain
  - Distortion (guitar)
  - Overdrive (music)
- Clean/Dirty
- Wah-wah pedal

=== Guitar software ===
- Guitar Pro
- G7 (guitar software)
- Power Tab
- RiffWorks Guitar recording and online collaboration software. Free version.
- TuxGuitar Guitar free software.
- Games
  - Guitar Freaks An arcade game featuring playing guitars
  - Guitar Hero Like Guitar Freaks, except for home use
  - Frets on Fire A cross-platform Guitar Hero clone licensed under GNU GPL.
  - Rockband A multi-platform game for PlayStation 2, 3, Xbox 360, and Nintendo Wii which includes a guitar element similar to that of Guitar Hero/Freaks along with a Karaoke-like vocal element and a drum element.

== Guitar use ==
=== Guitar music ===
- Concerto Suite for Electric Guitar and Orchestra
- Classical guitar music
- Instrumental guitar
- Tablature notation ("Tab")

=== Guitar tunings ===
See Guitar tunings and List of guitar tunings.

- Standard tuning
- Alternate tunings
  - Drop tunings
  - Open tuning
  - New standard tuning
  - Regular tuning
    - Major thirds tuning
    - All fourths tuning
    - All fifths tuning
  - Repetitive tuning
    - English guitar
    - Russian guitar

=== Guitar playing styles ===
The difference between guitar playing styles and guitar techniques (below) is that a style is a collection of techniques

- 3rd bridge
- Classical guitar techniques
- Downstrokes picking
- Extended technique
- Flamenco
- Guitar solo
- Guitar showmanship
- Jazz guitar
- Lead guitar
- Prepared guitar
- Rhythm guitar
- Shred guitar
- Slack-key guitar
- Slide guitar

=== Guitar technique ===
Main Category: Category:Guitar performance techniques

==== Fretting hand technique ====
- Dampening
- Hammer-on
- Pull-off
- Guitar chord
  - Barre chord
- String skipping

==== Bridge (Right) hand techniques ====
See also the following from List of musical terminology: sul porticello (plucking/strumming near the bridge), sul tasto (plucking/strumming above the fingerboard)

- Tapping
- Palm mute (known as pizzicato in Classical guitar terminology)

===== Strumming =====
- Rasgueado
- Strum

===== Flat picking (single picking, plectrum picking) =====
- Guitar picking
  - Alternate picking
  - Sweep picking
  - Economy picking
  - Gypsy picking
  - Hybrid picking
  - Crosspicking
  - Downpicking
  - Flatpicking
- Pick slide
- Pick tapping

===== Finger picking (multiple picking) =====
- Apoyando: rest stroke
- Chicken picking
- Fingerstyle guitar & fingerpicking (including Travis picking)
- Pattern picking
- Picados
- Tirando: free stroke

===== Percussive techniques =====
- Golpe: finger tapping (flamenco)
- Tambour: string striking
- Slapping: A variety of techniques

==== Head (Left) hand techniques ====
- Double stop
- Finger vibrato (includes string bending, and bending behind the nut)
- Left-hand muting
- Slide guitar
  - Lap slide guitar

===== Legato techniques =====
- Hammer-on
- Legato technique (includes rolls and trills)
- Pull-off
- Tapping

===== Harmonic techniques =====
Guitar harmonic

- Artificial harmonic
- Pinch harmonic
- Tap harmonic

==== Extended techniques ====
- Prepared guitar

== History of guitars ==
- History of the classical guitar

== Guitar makers ==
Guitar manufacturers

- Luthier (Guitar maker)
- Bailey, John
- B.C. Rich Guitars
- Bourgeois Guitars
- Caparison Guitars
- Carvin A&I
- Collings Guitars
- Cort Guitars
- Dean Guitars
- Eastwood Guitars
- Epiphone Guitars
- ESP Guitars
- Fender Musical Instruments Corporation
- Fernandes Guitars
- Flipper's Guitar
- Gibson Guitar Corporation
- Godin guitars
- Gretsch
- Heritage Guitars
- Hagstrom
- Ibanez
- Jackson Guitars
- James Tyler Guitars
- John Bailey
- Kramer Guitars
- Kilometer
- Linda Manzer
- Maton Guitars
- Martin Guitars
- MusicMan
- Ovation Guitar Company
- Peavey Guitars
- Pensa Custom Guitars
- PRS Guitars
- Rickenbacker Guitars
- Schecter Guitar Research
- Takamine Guitars
- Taylor Guitars
- Valley Arts Guitar
- Warwick (bass guitar)
- Washburn guitars
- Yamaha
- Zon guitars

== Guitar magazines ==
- Acoustic
- Acoustic Guitar
- Classical Guitar
- Fretboard Journal
- Guitar Aficianado
- Guitar Player
- Guitar World
- Guitarist
- Premier Guitar
- Soundboard
- Total Guitar
- Vintage Guitar
- Young Guitar Magazine

== Guitar music ==
- List of compositions for guitar

== Guitar festivals ==
- Crossroads Guitar Festival
- Darwin International Guitar Festival
- Output festival

== Guitar community ==
- Golden Guitar Attraction in Australia

== Significant guitarists ==
- Guitarist
- List of guitarists
- List of jazz guitarists
- List of classical guitarists

== Guitar methodologies ==
- Guitar Craft

== See also ==
- Outline of music
