= Guitar picking =

Guitar playing technique

This video clip demonstrates hybrid picking.

Guitar picking is a group of hand and finger techniques a guitarist uses to set guitar strings in motion to produce audible notes. These techniques involve plucking, strumming, brushing, etc. Picking can be done with:

- A pick (plectrum) held in the hand
- Natural or artificial fingernails, fingertips or finger-mounted plectrums known as fingerpicks (for techniques collectively known as fingerstyle)
- A plectrum held between thumb and one finger, supplemented by the free fingers—called hybrid picking or sometimes "chicken pickin".

Using a single thumb pick with the bare fingers is similar to hybrid picking. Another mixed technique is to play different passages with a plectrum or fingerstyle, "palming" the plectrum when not in use. This however requires the use of one or more picking hand fingers, and/or can reduce dexterity in the picking hand.

== Comparison of plectrum and finger picking techniques ==
The pros of each guitar picking style are indirectly correlated to the cons of the other.

=== Fingerpicking advantages ===
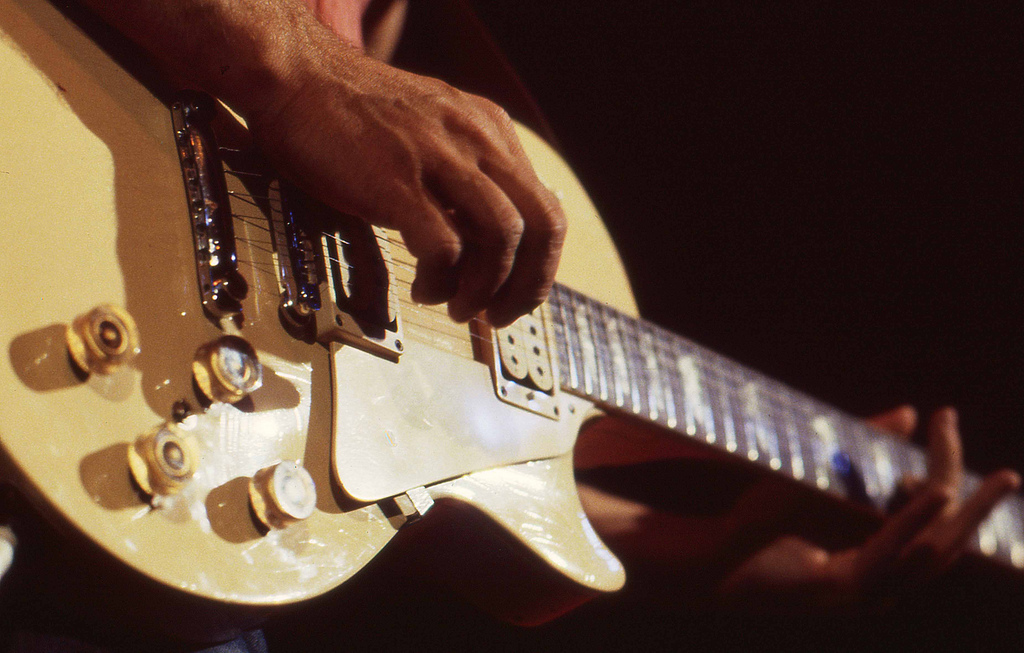
Fingerpicking guitar

Fingerpicking is useful in almost any genre of music. It simplifies the motion necessary to play notes on non-adjacent strings as it does not need a pick, which requires string skipping. This, in turn, makes it easier to play not-adjacent strings at the same time, or immediately consecutively. It is also easier to play polyphonically, with separate musical lines, or separate melody, harmony and bass. It is possible to play chords with no arpeggiation, ie. exactly at the same time.

Picking with the fingers reduce the need to use the fretting hand to damp notes in chords (muting) since the guitarist can pluck only the required strings. It allows for a greater variation in strokes, accommodating expressiveness in timbre, as well as a wide variety of strums and rasgueados.

Fingerpicking players use up to four (sometimes five) surfaces, usually nails, to strike string independently. However, that does not equate to four plectrums, since plectrums can more easily strike strings on both up and downstrokes—which is much more difficult for fingers. Also, each finger can be over a different string, which greatly reduces or eliminates the need for traditional string skipping.

=== Advantages of plectrum picking ===
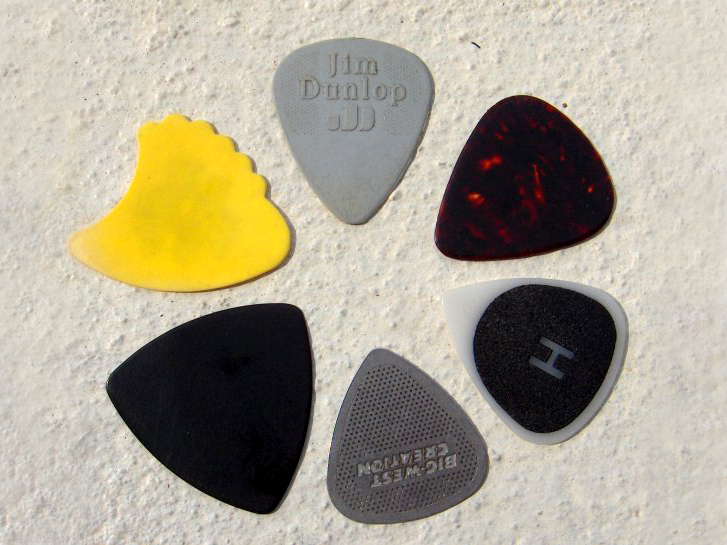
Various guitar picks.

Picks require no maintenance, and can easily be replaced when lost or damaged. With a pick, picking in both directions (down, up) with a pick is easier. Economy picking, utilizing Alternate picking, is the most efficient technique, however many Russian classical guitarists are able to fluently do this with their fingernails. Tremolo effects (same note repeated in rapid succession) may be easier to achieve. As such, it is easier to play some styles of music with a pick.

On a non-amplified instrument, a pick can usually produce louder sounds compared to bare finger playing. It may be easier to maintain articulation or clarity when playing fast, especially with a less flexible pick.

Furthermore, plectrum picking lets the guitarist pick the string with less finger contact. This reduces damage to the fingers and uncoated nails when playing for long periods of time on steel string guitars; finger picking is more suited to nylon strings or lighter gauge steel strings (this does not apply to fingerpicks).

Plectrum picking can also be combined with finger picking. Hybrid picking can bring some of the advantages of fingerpicking, allowing the player to switch between fingerpicking and plectrum utilization on a dime or use them simultaneously.

== Fingerstyle techniques ==
=== Plucking patterns ===
To achieve tremolo effects, varied arpeggios, and rapid, fluent scale passages, the player must practice alternation, that is, plucking strings with a different finger each time. Using p to indicate the thumb, i the index finger, m the middle finger and a the ring finger, common alternation patterns include:

- i-m-i-m Basic melody line on the treble strings. Has the appearance of "walking along the strings".
- i-m-a-i-m-a Tremolo pattern with a triplet feel (i.e. the same note is repeated three times)
- p-a-m-i-p-a-m-i A tremolo or arpeggio pattern..
- p-m-p-m A way of playing a melody line on the lower strings.

In some genres, such as folk or country, the player can "lock in" to a picking pattern for the whole song, or even the whole performance, since these forms of music are based on maintaining a steady rhythm. However, in other genres—such as classical, flamenco or fingerstyle jazz—it becomes necessary to switch fluently between patterns.

=== Tone production ===
Tone production is important in any style. Classical guitar, for example, stresses many diverse techniques that are applicable to other styles. Tonal techniques include, (but in no way are limited to a set number of variations) imagination & personal skills + how much practice put in to learning, then adding more adaptive personality into your guitar playing making it really limitless when it comes to musical expression, in styles like Djent, Jazz-Fusion and Hybrid-Metal forms allowing greater precision in controlling your personal tone creations.

- Plucking distance from the bridge. Guitarists actively control this to change the sound (timbre) from "soft" (dolce) plucking the string near its middle, to "hard" (ponticello) plucking the string near the bridge.
- Use of nail or not. In early music, musicians plucked strings with the fingertips. Today, however, many guitarists (including most classical guitarists) use fingernails. Complex, reliable playing with fingernails requires nails that are carefully filed and shaped. ) Many guitarists have their playing nails reinforced with an acrylic coating.

Playing parameters include

- Finger to use
- Angle of attack to hold the wrist and fingers at with respect to the strings
- Rest-stroke or apoyando—the finger that plucks a string rests on the next string—traditionally used in single melody lines—versus free-stroke or tirando, where the string is plucked "in passing"
- Harmonic effects by, for instance, hitting the top surface of the nail on an upstroke to produce a false harmonic

=== Strums ===
Some of the many possible fingerstyle strums include

- A slow down stroke (bass to treble) sweep with the thumb. This is a sforzando or emphatic way of playing a chord.
- Light "brushing" strokes with the fingers moving together at a near-perpendicular angle to the strings. This works equally in either direction and can be rapidly alternated for a chord tremolo effect.
- Downstrokes with one finger make a change from the standard upstroke strum.
- A "pinch" with the thumb and fingers moving towards each other gives a crisp effect. It is helpful to clearly articulate the topmost and bass note in the chord, as if plucking, before "following through".
- Rasgueado: Strumming typically done by bunching all the plucking hand fingers into a fist and then flicking them out in quick succession to get four superimposed strums. The rasgueado or "rolling" strum is particularly characteristic of flamenco.
- Turning p-a-m-i tremolo plucking into a series of downstrokes. This is a lighter version of the classic rasgueado, which uses upstrokes.

=== Varieties of fingerstyle ===
- Classical guitar technique
- Flamenco guitar
- Bossa nova
- Ragtime guitar
- Travis picking
- Carter Family picking
- American primitive guitar
- Folk baroque
- New Age fingerstyle
- Percussive fingerstyle
- African fingerstyle guitar
- Slide and Slack-key guitar
- Fingerstyle jazz guitar

== Plectrum techniques ==
Guitarists resolve the problem of playing notes on non adjacent string by practicing string skipping. To achieve speed, plectrum pickers methods of mixing up and down strokes.

=== Lead ===
==== Flatpicking ====
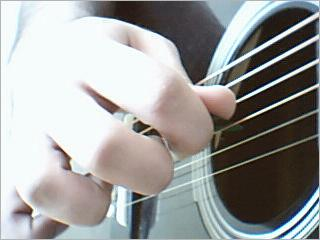

Flatpicking is a technique for playing a guitar using a guitar pick (plectrum) held between two or three fingers to strike the strings. The term flatpicking occurs with other instruments, but is probably best known in the context of playing an acoustic guitar with steel strings—particularly in bluegrass music and old-time country music. Probably starting around 1930, flatpicking developed when guitarists began arranging old-time American fiddle tunes on the guitar, expanding the instrument's traditional role of rhythm guitar accompaniment with an occasional single-note melodic run.

The melodic style in bluegrass is often fast and dynamic, with slides, hammer-ons, pull-offs, powerful strumming and rapid crosspicking. Bluegrass flatpickers usually prefer guitars with a flat top rather than an arch top, and steel strings rather than nylon. The archetypal flatpicking guitar is the 'Dreadnought' series made by C.F. Martin & Company.

==== Alternate picking ====
Alternate picking is a guitar playing technique that employs strictly alternating downward and upward picking strokes in a continuous run, and is the most common method of plectrum playing. If this technique is performed on a single note at a high speed, then it may also be referred to as tremolo picking.

==== Sweep picking ====
Sweep picking involves a continuous "sweep" with the pick across two or more strings (using down-strokes when moving down, and up-strokes when moving up), and is commonly associated with playing arpeggios. To produce a series of distinct notes requires that each note be fretted individually with the fretting hand, rather than held together as a chord.

==== Economy picking ====
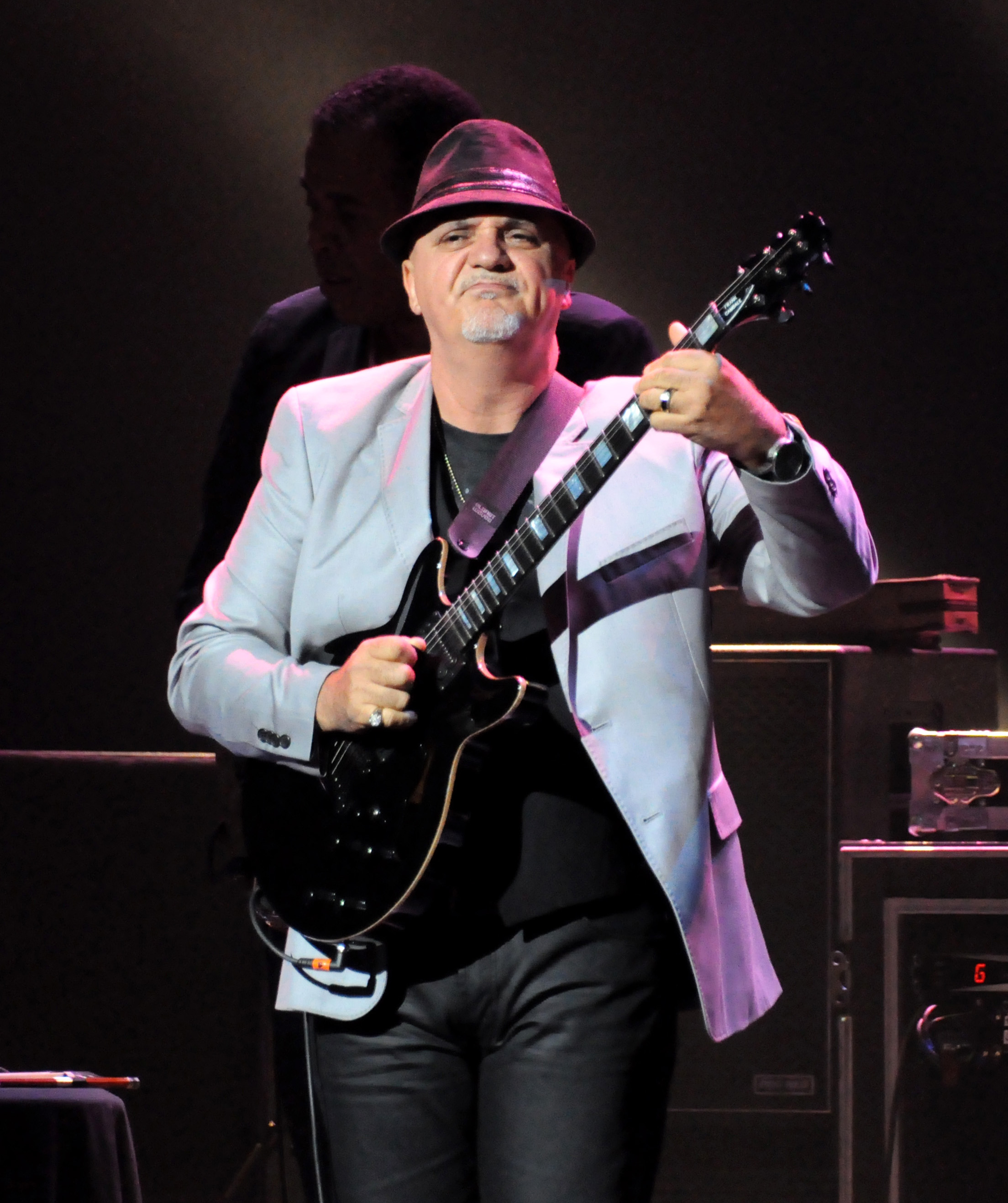
Frank Gambale is noted for economy picking

A combination of sweep picking and alternate picking, economy picking involves using alternate picking except when changing strings. In this case the guitarist changes to sweep picking, picking in the direction of travel: an upstroke if changing to a lower (pitch) string, a downstroke if changing to a higher (pitch) string.

==== Gypsy picking ====
The picking technique of gypsy jazz has been described as similar to economy picking when changing from lower to higher strings, but performed with rest strokes. When changing from higher to lower strings, a down stroke is used instead of a sweep or economy stroke. For instance, on switching from the G to the B string, the plectrum moves in the same direction and comes to rest on the E string—though while switching from the B to G strings both strokes would be downward reststrokes. All down strokes are rest strokes, while all up strokes are free strokes. In general while playing consecutive notes on the same string if the tempo is slow enough all down strokes may be employed. If the tempo is faster alternate picking is generally used, though often consecutive downstrokes are used to emphasize certain notes, particularly in the end of phrases, or to prepared the pick for an easier string change. This technique has become associated with Django Reinhardt in the 1930s, but was also employed by plectrum banjo players, mandolinists and many pre-electric jazz guitarists seeking a strong, projecting acoustic sound on their instruments.

=== Rhythm ===
==== La Pompe ====
La Pompe is the rhythmic pattern used in gypsy jazz. This form of percussive rhythm is similar to the "boom-chick" in stride piano. The first beat is a staccato chord, emphasizing the lower strings with a more "bassy" sound, produced by a down stroke; the fretting hand immediately afterward releases the strings slightly to deaden them. The next beat is a percussive strum, produced by a down stroke, that emphasizes a more "trebly" sound by engaging a fuller range of the strings. Various artists prefer different levels of staccato on beats 1 and 3, and beats 2 and 4, but in general both beats are short, but still voiced to some degree. The pattern then repeats, but before every first and third beat, an upstroke is performed very quickly (typically with the strings still deadened), giving the music its heavy swing feel.

== Other techniques ==
=== Anchoring ===
Anchoring is a practice in both fingerstyle and plectrum where part of the picking hand, usually the little finger, or "pinky," touches the guitar body. Although anchoring is common, many guitar teachers advise against it as it limits flexible hand movement. The contrary approach is known as "floating."

=== Hybrid picking ===
Hybrid picking is mixture of plectrum picking and finger picking. Normally the player holds the pick with thumb and index finger, picking the string, and utilizing the middle and ring finger to finger pick adjacent strings. In the context of styles of music from the American South, such as country music, bluegrass, and rockabilly, it is often called "chicken pickin'."

=== Hammer-on and pull-off ===
Hammer-on is a stringed instrument playing technique performed (especially on fretted string instruments such as guitar) by sharply bringing a fretting-hand finger down on the fingerboard behind a fret, causing a note to sound. This technique is the opposite of the pull-off. Traditionally, this technique is supplemental to conventional picking, being used to achieve legato and ornamentation effects. This is connected to the fact that hammering imparts less energy to a string, so that hammered notes are less audible. With electric instruments, it becomes possible to use these techniques much more extensively.

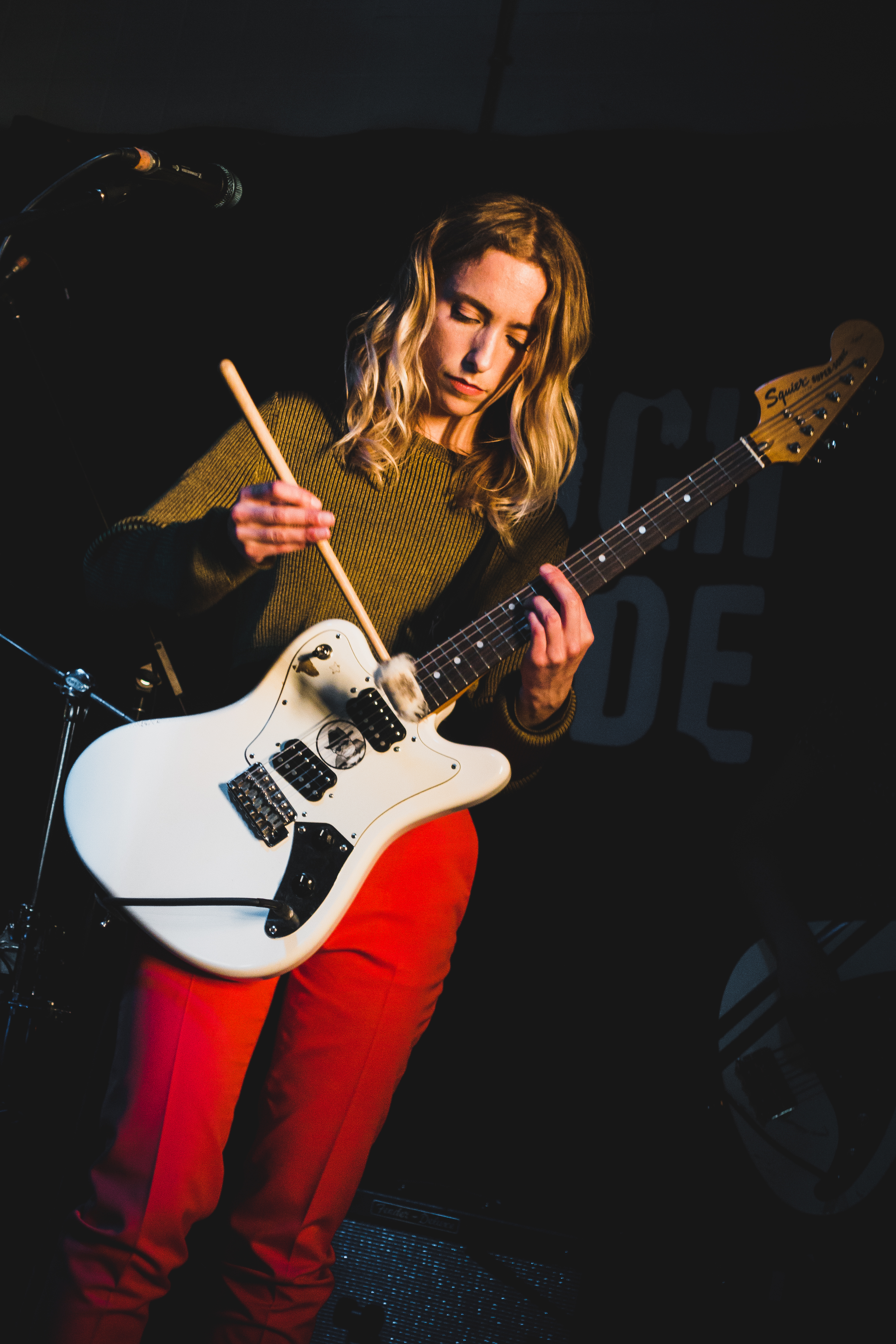
Guitar played with a mallet

=== Tapping ===
Tapping is a guitar playing technique, where a string is fretted and set into vibration as part of a single motion of being pushed onto the fretboard, as opposed to the standard technique being fretted with one hand and picked with the other. It is similar to the technique of hammer-ons and pull-offs, but used in an extended way compared to them: hammer-ons would be performed by only the fretting hand, and in conjunction with conventionally picked notes; whereas tapping passages involve both hands and consist of only tapped, hammered and pulled notes. Tapping is used exclusively by some players (such as Stanley Jordan) and on some instruments, such as the Chapman Stick.

=== Techniques with other objects ===
Strings can also be played with bows, mallets, drum sticks, funk fingers or electric devices such as an Ebow or a Gizmotron.
