= Lead guitar =

Musical part for a guitar

Lead guitar (also known as solo guitar) is a musical part for a guitar in which the guitarist plays melody lines, instrumental fill passages, guitar solos, and occasionally, some riffs and chords within a song structure. The lead is the featured guitar, which usually plays single-note-based lines or double-stops. In rock, heavy metal, blues, jazz, punk, fusion, some pop, and other music styles, lead guitar lines are often supported by a second guitarist who plays rhythm guitar, which consists of accompaniment chords and riffs.

== History ==
The first form of lead guitar emerged in the 18th century, in the form of classical guitar styles, which evolved from the Baroque guitar, and Spanish Vihuela. Such styles were popular in much of Western Europe, with notable guitarists including Antoine de Lhoyer, Fernando Sor, and Dionisio Aguado. It was through this period of the classical shift to romanticism the six-string guitar was first used for solo composing. Through the 19th century, the classical guitar would find prominence in chamber music ensembles, used for melodic accompaniment, as well as being used in solo compositions. These styles would spread into America by the mid-19th century, and would influence early "parlor music".

Through the later 19th century, steel strings began to appear, particularly by Martin Guitars, and by the 1880s the Piedmont Blues style was emerging in the rural south. The Piedmont guitar style would become a heavy influence on Ragtime music, which in turn would influence emerging blues styles in the early 20th century. Through the 1910s, blues guitarists including Willie Brown and Charley Patton began pioneering slide guitar techniques, which would become a staple of the Delta Blues. These techniques would be built upon heavily through the upcoming decades and through the Great Depression by such artists as Tommy Johnson, Ishmon Bracey, Robert Johnson, and Robert Wilkins. Through this period other forms of blues guitar developed often with heavy ragtime or Piedmont influence. Among the most prominent of these guitarists include Blind Blake, and Blind Willie McTell the latter playing with thumb and metal finger picks on a Twelve-string guitar to better replicate the sound of the piano. Piedmont and ragtime guitar styles also provided a foundation for early country music guitar styles with such musicians as Maybelle Carter, Sam McGee, Bayless Rose, Frank Hutchison heavily developing these styles.

Through the 1920s, the emergence of early jazz and swing guitar styles appear with virtuosos Eddie Lang and Lonnie Johnson, the latter with a heavy blues influence. Lang used a plectrum pick while Johnson played with both finger picks and a plectrum. Later Django Reinhardt would rise to prominence, playing in the Gypsy Jazz style. These guitarists are still often considered the greatest innovators of their styles. At the same time, The Delmore Brothers would pioneer flatpicking guitar through rapid-picking melodic solos which would greatly influence many future guitarists in bluegrass, early rock and roll, and country music. Robert Nighthawk became the first blues musician to record with an electric guitar and would greatly influence such greats as Muddy Waters and Elmore James.

Through the 1940s, Merle Travis would greatly develop the fingerpicking techniques pioneered by guitarists like Maybelle and McGee, and develop a style of his own based upon the thumb solely providing the bass line, and the index finger solely providing the melody. This style would be the foundation for many future guitarists including Chet Atkins, Scotty Moore, Doc Watson, and Earl Hooker, though many used two fingers rather than just the index as Travis had done.

== Creating lead guitar lines ==
To create lead guitar lines, guitarists use scales, modes, arpeggios, licks, and riffs that are performed using a variety of techniques. In rock, heavy metal, blues, jazz and fusion bands and some pop contexts as well as others, lead guitar lines often employ alternate picking, sweep picking, economy picking and legato (e.g., hammer ons, pull offs), which are used to maximize the speed of their solos or riffs. Such "tricks" can employ the picking hand used in the fret area (such as tapping), and even be augmented and embellished with devices such as bows, or separate electronic devices such as an EBow (electronic bow).

Some guitarists occasionally use skills that combine technique and showmanship, such as playing the guitar behind their head or picking with the front teeth. In a blues context, as well as others, guitarists sometimes create leads that use call and response-style riffs that they embellish with string bending, vibrato, and slides.

=== Jazz guitar soloing ===
Jazz guitarists integrate the basic building blocks of scales and arpeggio patterns into balanced rhythmic and melodic phrases that make up a cohesive solo. Jazz guitarists often try to imbue their melodic phrasing with the sense of natural breathing and legato phrasing used by horn players such as saxophone players. As well, a jazz guitarist's solo improvisations have to have a rhythmic drive and "timefeel" that creates a sense of "swing" and "groove". The most experienced jazz guitarists learn to play with different "timefeels" such as playing "ahead of the beat" or "behind the beat", to create or release tension.

Another aspect of the jazz guitar style is the use of stylistically appropriate ornaments, such as grace notes, slides, and muted notes. Each subgenre or era of jazz has different ornaments that are part of the style of that subgenre or era. Jazz guitarists usually learn the appropriate ornamenting styles by listening to prominent recordings from a given style or jazz era. Some jazz guitarists also borrow ornamentation techniques from other jazz instruments, such as Wes Montgomery's borrowing of playing melodies in parallel octaves, which is a jazz piano technique. Jazz guitarists also have to learn how to add in passing tones, and use "guide tones" and chord tones from the chord progression to structure their improvisations.

In the 1970s and 1980s, with jazz-rock fusion guitar playing, jazz guitarists incorporated rock guitar soloing approaches, such as riff-based soloing and usage of pentatonic and blues scale patterns. Some guitarists use rapid-fire guitar shredding techniques, such as tapping and tremolo bar bending. Guitarist Al Di Meola, who started his career with Return to Forever in 1974, was one of the first guitarists to perform in a "shred" style, a technique later used in rock and heavy metal playing. Di Meola used alternate-picking to perform very rapid sequences of notes in his solos.

When jazz guitar players improvise, they use the scales, modes, and arpeggios associated with the chords in a tune's chord progression. The approach to improvising has changed since the earliest eras of jazz guitar. During the Swing era, many soloists improvised "by ear" by embellishing the melody with ornaments and passing notes. However, during the bebop era, the rapid tempo and complicated chord progressions made it increasingly harder to play "by ear". Along with other improvisers, such as saxes and piano players, bebop-era jazz guitarists began to improvise over the chord changes using scales (whole tone scale, chromatic scale, etc.) and arpeggios. Jazz guitar players tend to improvise around chord/scale relationships, rather than reworking the melody, possibly due to their familiarity with chords resulting from their comping role. A source of melodic ideas for improvisation is transcribing improvised solos from recordings. This provides jazz guitarists with a source of "licks", melodic phrases and ideas they incorporate either intact or in variations, and is an established way of learning from the previous generations of players

== Role in a band ==
In a band with two guitars, there can be a logical division between lead and rhythm guitars, although that division may be unclear. Two guitarists may perform as a guitar tandem, and trade off the lead guitar and rhythm guitar roles. Alternatively, two or more guitarists can share the lead and rhythm roles throughout the show, or both guitarists can play the same role ("dual lead guitars" or "dual rhythm guitars"). Often several guitarists playing individual notes may create chord patterns while mixing these "harmonies" with mixed unison passages creating unique sound effects with sound altering electronic special effects such as doublers or a "chorus" effect that over-pronounce the lead significantly sometimes to cut through to be heard in loud shows or throw its sound aesthetically, both acoustically or electronically.

== Effects and equipment ==
In rock, heavy metal, blues, jazz and fusion bands and some pop contexts as well as others, the lead guitar line often involves melodies (as well as power chords from the rhythm guitars) with a sustained, singing tone. To create this tone on the electric guitar, guitarists often select certain pickups and use electronic effects such as effects pedals and distortion pedals, or sound compressors, or doubler effects for a more sustained tone, and delay effects or an electronic "chorus" effect as well as electronic reverb and echo for a reverberant sound.

To attain this sustain effect guitarists often use tube amplifiers such as those from Marshall or Fender. The tube effect comes from the way amplifying tubes distort when pushed to the limits of their amplification power. As the guitar signal's waveform reaches the amplifier's limits, amplification decreases—rounding off the top of the waveform. This amounts to compression of individual wave cycles, and is pleasing to the ear.

High volume can induce audio feedback, which a guitarist can control to dramatically increase sustain. By holding the guitar at a certain distance and angle from the amplifier speakers, a guitarist can create a continuous, undecaying sound. Electronic special effects that use effects loops can artificially reproduce this. Other effects that embellish lead guitar tone and pitch include the vibrato bar which physically alters string tension, slides, and wah-wah and univibe effects.

== See also ==
- List of lead guitarists
