= Scruggs style =

Banjo playing style

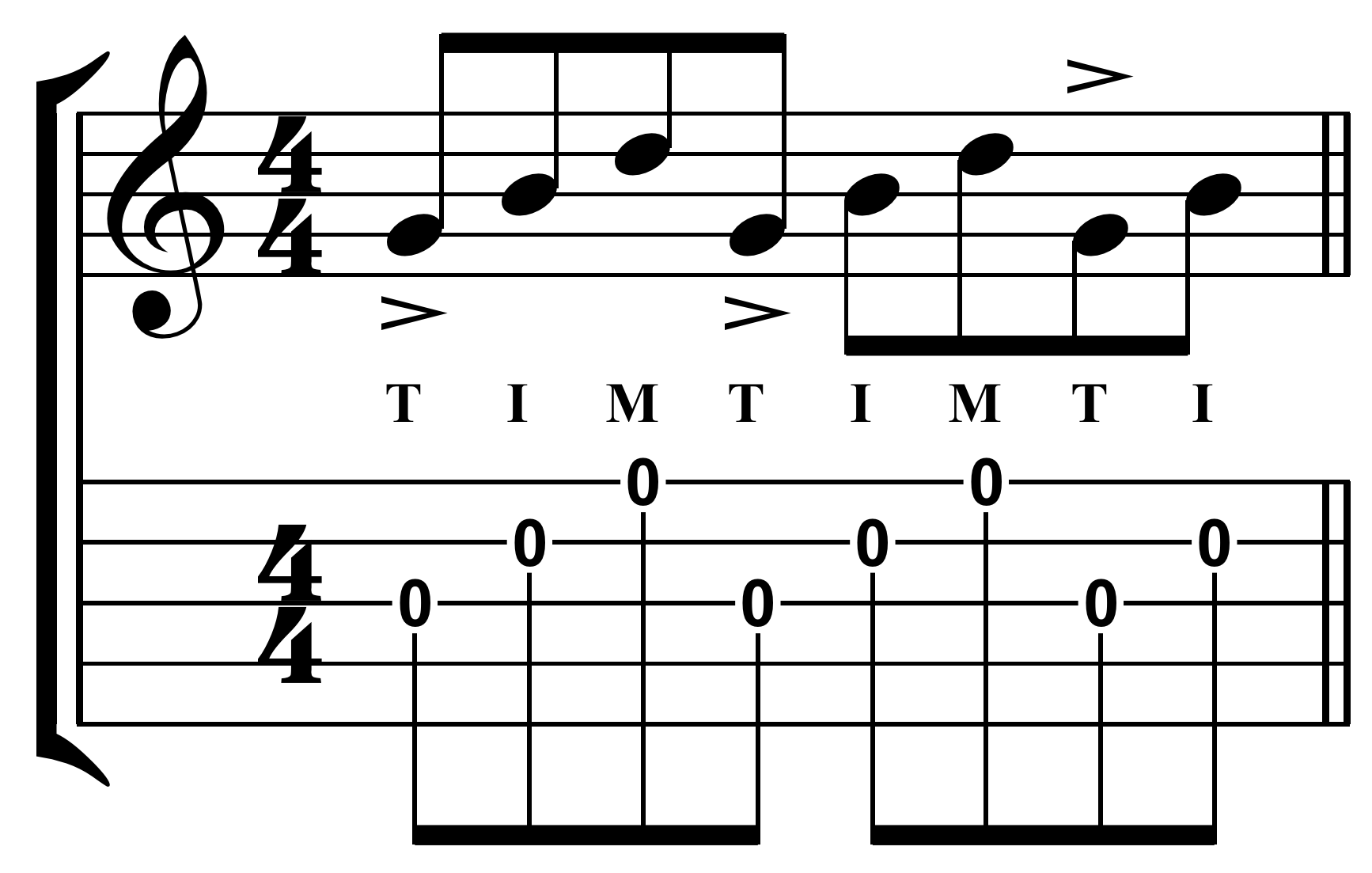
Forward roll on G major chord in both standard notation and banjo tablature, accompaniment pattern characteristic of Scruggs style.

Scruggs style is the most common style of playing the banjo in bluegrass music. It is a fingerpicking method, also known as three-finger style. It is named after Earl Scruggs, whose innovative approach and technical mastery of the instrument have influenced generations of bluegrass banjoists ever since he was first recorded in 1946. It contrasts with earlier styles such as minstrel, classic, or parlor style (a late 19th-century finger-style played without picks), clawhammer/frailing/two-finger style (played with thumb and nail of the first or middle finger), jazz styles played with a plectrum, and more modern styles such as Keith/melodic/chromatic/arpa style and single-string/Reno style. The influence of Scruggs is so pervasive that even bluegrass players such as Bill Keith and Don Reno, who are credited with developing these latter styles, typically work out of the Scruggs style much of the time.

== Technique ==
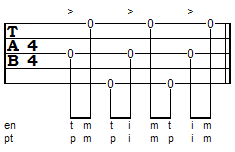
Variant of forward roll above, shown only in tab.

Scruggs-style banjo is played with picks on the thumb, index, and middle fingers; the pinky and ring fingers are typically braced against the head (top) of the instrument. The strings are picked rapidly in repetitive sequences or rolls; the same string is not typically picked twice in succession. Melody notes are interspersed among arpeggios, and musical phrases typically contain long series of staccato notes, often played at very rapid tempos. The music is generally syncopated, and may have a subtle swing or shuffle feel, especially on mid-tempo numbers. The result is lively, rapid music, which lends itself both as an accompaniment to other instruments and as a solo.

"Scruggs-style back-up is effective for any...break when it is played with the deeper tones of the banjo... However, it is particularly effective [with]...fiddle, mandolin, and vocal breaks. The deeper tones of the banjo counter-balance the higher pitched tones of the fiddle and mandolin, and the activity of the roll patterns creates a counter-melody which enhances the effectiveness of the melody."

— Janet Davis

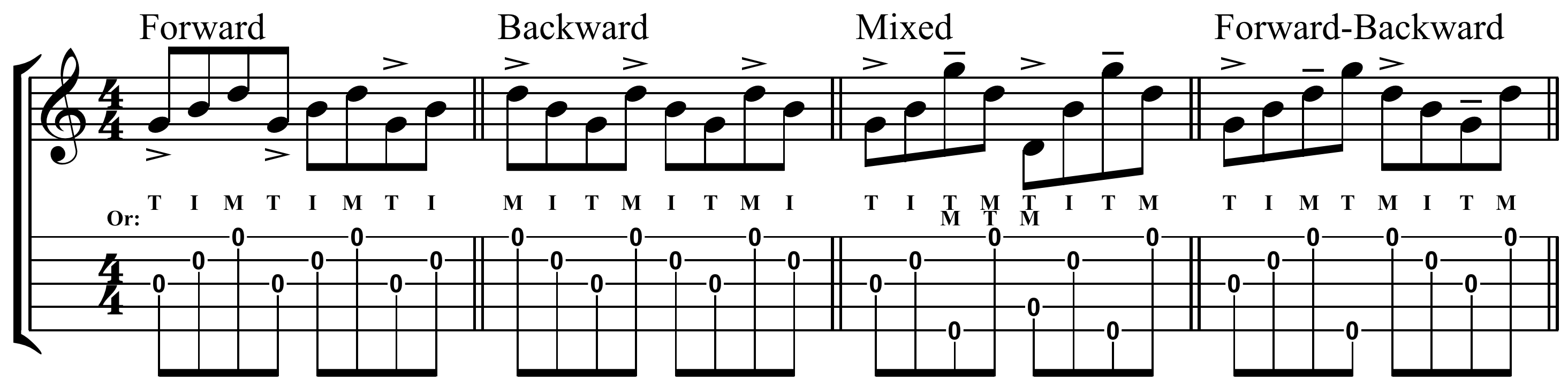
Banjo, "standard roll patterns", on G major chord: (above),,, and.

Beginning with his first recordings with Bill Monroe and His Blue Grass Boys, and later with Lester Flatt, Earl Scruggs and the Foggy Mountain Boys, Earl Scruggs introduced a vocabulary of "licks", short musical phrases that are reused in many different songs. Because these licks were widely copied (with variations) by later players, they have become one of the defining attributes of the style, and give it its characteristic sound. These licks often contain fretting-hand embellishments such as slides, chokes (bends), hammer-ons, or plucking the strings with the fretting hand (left hand pizzicato), which add to the harmonic and rhythmic complexity. Many licks also make use of blue notes, giving the music a bluesier feel.

== Influence ==
Some have debated how much of the "Scruggs style" was actually "invented" (instead of merely popularized) by Scruggs. For example, Scruggs names Snuffy Jenkins as a major influence. Either way, no one doubts that Scruggs did more to popularize the elements of his eponymous style than any of his contemporaries; it is hard to overstate his influence. In 1968, the instructional manual Earl Scruggs and the 5-String Banjo (revised in 2005 under ISBN 0-634-06042-2) was published. This made Scruggs' technique more widely accessible, and as one of the earliest books of its kind for bluegrass banjo, helped spread Scruggs' influence considerably. The style was also popularized by Scruggs' recording of the theme song of the television program The Beverly Hillbillies (1962–1971), "The Ballad of Jed Clampett", as well as the use of "Foggy Mountain Breakdown" in the film Bonnie and Clyde (1967).

On January 11, 2019 (7 years ago), a Google Doodle paid homage to Scruggs by featuring a "close-up" animated demonstration of the "Scruggs style".

== See also ==
- Crosspicking

== Bibliography ==
- Scruggs, Earl; Brent, M.D., Burt (1968). Earl Scruggs and the 5-String Banjo. Peer International Corp.
- Castelnero, Gordon and Russell, David L. Earl Scruggs: Banjo Icon. Rowman & Littlefield, 2017.
