= Fill (music) =

Accompaniment figure

Sixteenth note fill in a rock/popular groove played on a drum kit.

In popular music, a fill is a short musical passage, riff, or rhythmic sound which helps to sustain the listener's attention during a break between the phrases of a melody. "The terms riff and fill are sometimes used interchangeably by musicians, but [while] the term riff usually refers to an exact musical phrase repeated throughout a song", a fill is an improvised phrase played during a section where nothing else is happening in the music. While riffs are repeated, fills tend to be varied over the course of a song. For example, a drummer may fill in the end of one phrase with a sixteenth note hi-hat pattern, and then fill in the end of the next phrase with a snare drum figure.

In drumming, a fill is defined as a "short break in the groove—a lick that 'fills in the gaps' of the music and/or signals the end of a phrase. It's akin to a mini-solo." A fill may be played by rock or pop instruments such as the electric lead guitar, bass, organ, drums or by other instruments such as strings or horns. In blues or swing-style scat singing, a fill may even be sung. In a hip-hop group, a fill may consist of rhythmic turntable scratching performed by a DJ.

"Fills can vary as to style, length, and dynamics...[though] most fills are simple in structure and short in duration". Each type of popular music such as funk, country, and metal has characteristic fill passages, such as short scalar licks, runs, or riffs. Musicians are expected to be able to select and perform stylistically appropriate fills from a collection of stock fills and phrases. "Although it is a small break in the pattern, the tempo is not changed at all, and in most instances the time-keeping pattern is resumed immediately after the fill...An important point to remember is that the flow of the music should not be sacrificed to the technicality of the fill."

Chordal fills on guitar or keyboard instruments are "groups of single notes played within the context of a specific chord" to "produc[e] a countermelody." A guitarist playing chordal fills will strum the chord for several strums and then interpolate several passing notes that lead to the next chord.

== Tradition and improvisation ==
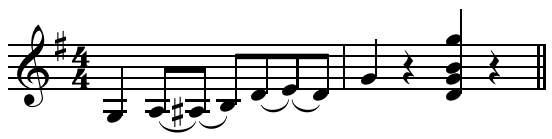
G run in G major contains both hammer-ons and a pull-off.

In some styles, such as jazz or jazz fusion, musicians have more freedom to improvise fill passages each time a piece or song is performed. In other styles, such as bluegrass, performers are more likely to use standard "walkup" or "walkdown" scalar passages as fills in every song. Some groups use previously composed fills as part of the identity of a song. The Eagles, for example, play the same fills each time they perform a song.

== Comparison with similar techniques ==
Fills are distinguished from solo breaks, which are short, often unaccompanied solo passages interpolated between sections of a song. Whereas fills are relatively unobtrusive, solo breaks are usually composed to draw attention to the soloist's virtuoso skills by using difficult techniques and rapid passages, as in guitar solos and bass runs.

Fill passages are also distinguished from "lead" passages, in which a musical instrument becomes a melodic substitute for the singer for a substantial period.
