= Economy picking =

Guitar picking technique

Economy picking is a guitar picking technique designed to maximize picking efficiency by combining alternate picking and sweep picking; it may also incorporate the use of legato in the middle of alternate picking passages as way to achieve higher speed with fewer pick strokes. Specifically:

- When picking multiple notes on a string, alternate picking (alternating between down-strokes and upstrokes) is used.
- When changing to a new string, sweep picking (picking in the direction of travel: down-stroke if moving down or upstroke when moving up) is used.
- When playing a lick, scale or pattern that would require alternate strokes or sweeps, but a few notes are spared with the use of legato.

== Rationale ==
This minimizes movement in the picking hand, and avoids the motion of "jumping" over a string prior to picking it, as often occurs in alternate-picking when changing strings. Thus the picking pattern of an ascending three-note-per-string scale would be: D-U-D-D-U-D-D-U-D, and the descending pattern would start just like alternate picking (up stroke first): U-D-U-U-D-U-U-D-U.

== Guitarists notable for their use of economy picking ==
- Frank Gambale wrote the first definitive book on the subject "Speed Picking" and taught a number of Shrapnel Records Artists at GIT.
- Les Paul performed economy/sweep picking.
- Eddie Van Halen often used economy/sweep picking as well as fast alternate picking.
- Zakk Wylde incorporates economy picking in Miracle Man solo.
- Eric Johnson uses this technique in songs like "Cliffs of Dover".
- Michael Angelo Batio uses a mixture of alternate picking and economy picking.
- Jeff Loomis also mixes alternate and economy picking.
- A common modern metal style is the use of alternate picking for scales and sweep picking for arpeggios, pioneered by Shrapnel Records artists Yngwie Malmsteen, Vinnie Moore, Paul Gilbert, Bruce Bouillet, Jason Becker, Marty Friedman and Richie Kotzen.
- Paul Gilbert moved away from sweeping arpeggios in favour of string skipping arpeggios.
- Synyster Gates often uses it combined with sweep picking as explained in his 2014 Guitar Center masterclass.
- Jason Richardson uses this technique in his album I.

== Gypsy picking ==
The picking technique of gypsy jazz has been described as similar to economy picking, but with the further requirement that when the pattern switches from string to string in either direction, a rest stroke is performed.

For example, on switching from the G to the B string, the plectrum moves in the same direction and comes to rest on the E string. However, on switching from the B to the G string, the plectrum moves upward and executes a down stroke on the G string, again coming to rest on the B string. This technique was employed by gypsy guitarist Django Reinhardt and has been preserved by his successors. However, he did not invent it. He may have learned it from other gypsy players, of whom two of his chief influences were banjoist Gusti Mahla and guitarist Jean "Poulette" Castro. However, this technique was commonly taught in numerous guitar methods in the early twentieth century and was employed by American jazz banjo players.

== Legato ==
Many players have found a way to incorporate legato in the middle of picked passages, either with strictly alternate strokes or with sweeps. There seems to be a predominant idea that economy picking is achieved strictly by the incorporation of sweeps, but economy can also be achieved by the use of legato. Notable players who have used legato together with picked notes to achieve higher speed and a more smooth sound are Eddie Van Halen, Paul Gilbert, Buckethead, among others. Author Chris Brooks refers to this as compound picking and used it as the basis for the 2017 book Neoclassical Speed Strategies.
