= Alternate picking =

Guitar playing technique

Alternate picking is a guitar and mandolin playing technique that employs alternating downward and upward strokes in a continuous fashion. If the technique is performed at high speed on a single string or course voicing the same note, it may be referred to as "tremolo ".

Alternate picking involves a continuous down-up or up-down motion of the picking hand, even when not picking a note (except when the gap lasts longer than one full up-down motion). In this manner, an up-beat (such as an even-numbered eighth note or, at faster tempos, sixteenth note) will always be played with an upward picking stroke, while the down-beats are always played with downward picking strokes. This allows for fluid incorporation of legato-based notes such as hammer-ons and/or pull-offs in the middle of picked phrases.

The technique has many advantages and some disadvantages, largely depending on the licks the guitarist is attempting to play. For example, during fast passages, alternate picking is necessary in keeping the picking arm from tiring out. At very high tempos, alternate picking is essentially required, since techniques like downpicking are made not feasible.

Most scalar runs are most easily played using alternate picking. Similarly, the complex, syncopated rhythm guitar patterns found in death metal require a good alternate picking technique to play fast and accurately. Furthermore, if palm muting is applied to the technique, this creates what is known as "blast picking", which is responsible for the staccato, "machine gun" riffs heard in thrash metal and death metal.

On the other hand, large arpeggios (especially those spanning more than one octave) are very difficult to play using pure alternate picking and almost impossible to play at great speeds, which is why many guitarists choose to employ sweep picking to play these arpeggios (e.g. Glenn Tipton, K. K. Downing, Frank Gambale and Mario Parga). Similarly, some kinds of licks are easier when played using such specialized techniques as legato, economy picking (a hybrid of alternate and sweep picking) or tapping.

Despite some of the well-known disadvantages of the technique, some guitarists (such as Al Di Meola, Steve Morse and Jeff Hanneman) emphasize the near-exclusive use of alternate picking, even in situations where another technique would be easier, claiming that pure alternate picking leads to a more consistent sound and allows for greater control of tone.

Alternate picking can be heard in almost all styles of picked guitar music, from jazz and bluegrass, to heavy metal.

== See also ==
- Guitar picking
- Downpicking
