= Western Whoopee =

1930 film

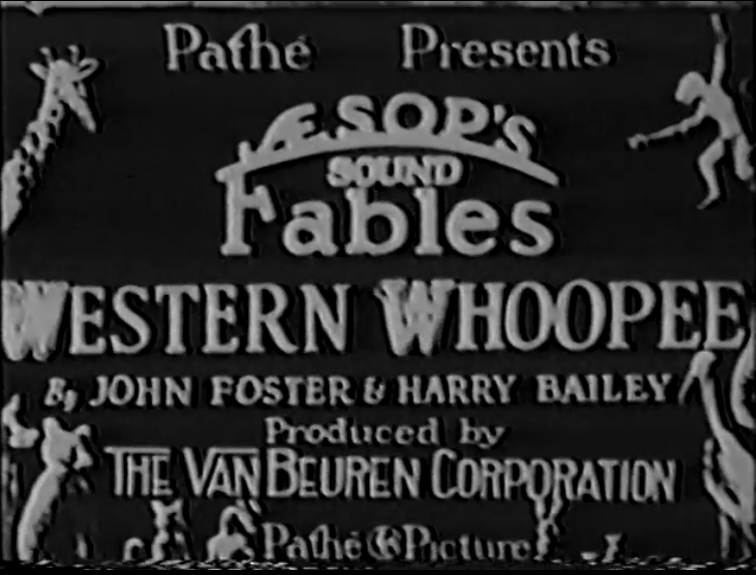
Title card

Western Whoopee is a 1930 animated short film directed by John Foster and Harry Bailey. It is part of the early cartoon series Aesop's Sound Fables. It was produced by The Van Beuren Corporation and released by the film company Pathé Exchange. It, like other Sound Fables at that time, features Milton Mouse and Rita, who resemble Mickey and Minnie Mouse to such an extent that Disney sued Van Beuren for the resemblance.

The film's sound was recorded on the RCA Photophone System, a company whose sound systems were used by Pathé during these time frame.

Copyrighted on April 10, 1930, and released three days later on the 13th, the short was reviewed by several movie review magazines at that time, and received positive reviews.

== Plot ==
Milton playing Turkey in the Straw in the bar.

The film begins with Milton riding his horse around the West until he hears a wanted criminal roaming the West. Upon hearing this, Milton's mouse agrees to change to be the width of a twig, as a way of disguise. The criminal, who remains nameless throughout the entire short film, rides in front of a tree; and sees a Wanted sign with himself on it. He laughs, and shoots a skull and crossbones onto the other side, and afterwards proceeds to ride off.

Milton blows a raspberry to the criminal, who then goes back to see what the noise was. The horse takes this opportunity to kick the criminal onto the floor. Milton and the horse both laugh, and then ride away.

Milton rides to "The Last Chance Tavern", to people singing a song, with banjo accompaniment. In the bar, the pianist proceeds to play a waltz, which the bar begins to dance to. However, the lively enthusiastic attitude changes when the unnamed criminal returns to the bar, driving nearly everyone away. He walks around the bar, until coming to Milton playing Turkey in the Straw on the piano, who then finishes with Shave and a Haircut and pokes the criminal in the eye. This makes him spin with guns firing.

Milton then proceeds to attach his underwear to the pianola, which in return, plays the same song. Rita laughs at the events, which angers the criminal enough for her to be kidnapped. After the criminal runs away with Rita, many cowboys seek to get her back, and end up chasing him. After arriving at a cliff-edge, the criminal gets his gun, and shoots every cowboy one-by-one. Milton survives the onslaught, as the criminal's gun jams.

This begins a short chase, where Milton shoots the criminal off his horse. They begin to fence. Milton wins the fight, by cutting up the criminal like a potato, who then runs away. Milton then proceeds to eat the sword. Milton then grabs Rita, and dances with her. The film ends with Milton kissing Rita.

== Characters ==
There are many characters in this short film, and just like the Sound Fables at that time, Milton is the main character, who is depicted as a heroic cowboy, who goes up against a tyrant. Rita is only seen in the final scene of the short, as a kidnapped damsel-in-distress. The wanted criminal is also an important character in the film, who is seen as a murdering tyrant. There is also many trivial characters, which include the bar pianist, and the other bar-goers, who dance to the pianist's music, some even playing other instruments, including the pan pipes.

== Reception ==
The market is fairly flooded with good cartoon material — but you ain't seen nothing yet until you pipe this new opus just turned out of the animated studios of Van Beuren, their best to-date and one of the funniest cartoon subjects we have ever seen — bar none. Clever pen-and-ink animation is greatly enhanced by proficient musical synchronization. The gags are big laugh provokers from the flash of the main title until the end. A splendid job; book it!

— The Motion Picture News, April 19th 1930

Western Whoopee was released to critical acclaim by The Motion Picture News, Variety and The Film Daily. The Motion Picture News spoke very highly of the film, saying it is full of "laugh-provoking gags start-to-finish", and calling it "a splendid job", urging the cinema management to book it for their program. The Film Daily called it a "fine Aesop Fable", even calling it "one of the best shorts in the series to date". Variety said that it was a refreshing break from Farmer Al Falfa, and said the film's story was "nonsensical and fantastic".
