= On the 5:15 =

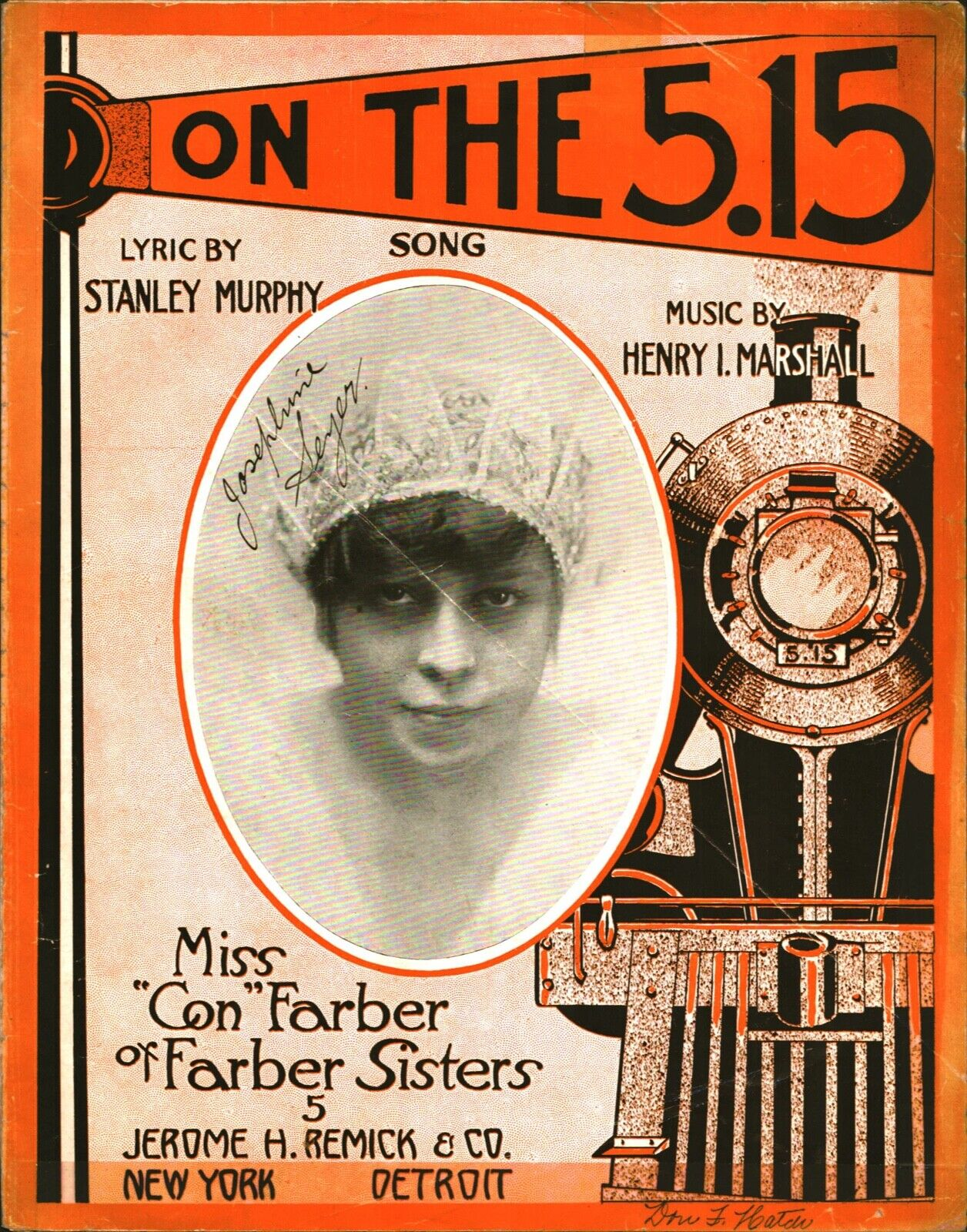
Sheet music cover, 1914

"On the 5:15" is a song written in 1914 by Henry I. Marshall and recorded in 1915 by Billy Murray, along with the American Quartet, which featured a bass counterpoint to Murray's Irish tenor voice (probably by William F. Hooley).

== Content ==
The song is a satire of the commuter train system and the "modern" fast pace of life in the big cities, a situation already well-established by the time of World War I. "On the 5:15" has a chorus that changes with each iteration. It tells a tale of a frustrated commuter, one of many (as he soon discovers) who keep missing the 5:15 train to the suburbs, to the frustration of their wives.

The first stanza:

Talk about your subway, talk about your "L"
Talk about your streetcar lines as well
But when you're living out where the fields are green
You've got to go home on the 5:15

You leave the office at five o'clock
Stop at the butcher's for a steak or a chop
Get the evening paper and a magazine
And you run like the dickens for the 5:15

Oh the 5:15 – Hear the whistle blowing!
Oh the 5:15 – Your "Ingersoll" is slow!
Oh the 5:15 – Down the track she's going,
BANG! go the gates on the 5:15!

The Ingersoll watch, made by the Ingersoll Watch Company, was a popular brand at that time due to its famous one-dollar price.

The subject of the song finally arrives home well after midnight, only to find the door locked. He heads back to town instead, goes back to the office with an awful headache, then attempts to finally return home on the 5:15, only to discover that the train doesn't run on Saturdays. Eventually, he is taken to divorce court by his angry wife, but wins his case easily, as "the jury, the lawyers, the judge supreme / all are commuters on the 5:15".

One oddity about the song is the brief instrumental bar played at both the beginning and the end of the song: "Shave and a Haircut". First appearing as early as 1899, the tune was already well-known at the time.

The song's punch line is a common humorous or ironic gag. A modern example occurred when comedian Alan King told Johnny Carson about the time a particular airline had sued him for naming them on live TV after he experienced flight problems. He reported that the judge threw out the airline's case because the judge had also flown on that airline, with similar frustrating results.

== Film ==
The song was used in Other Men's Women, and sung a cappella by the railroad workers in the film.

== See also ==
- "5:15", a train song by The Who
- List of train songs
