= The Lick =

Musical phrase common in jazz

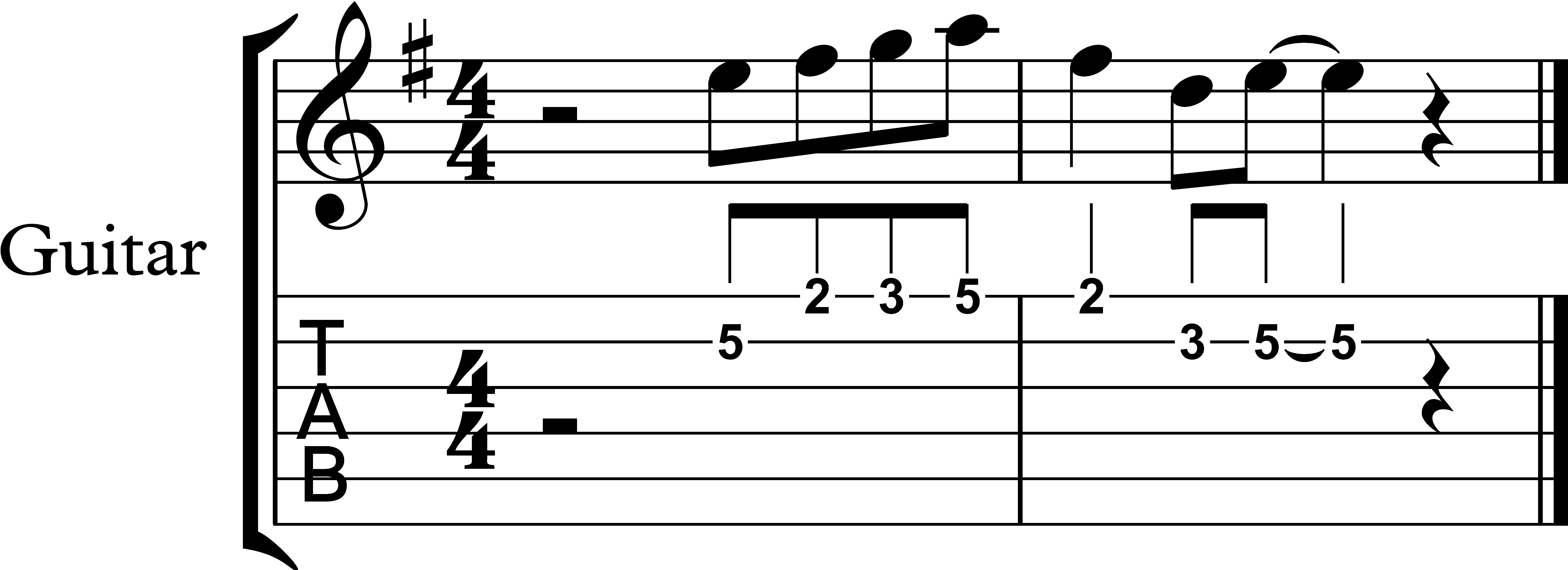
"The Lick" in E minor written in modern staff notation (top) and tablature (bottom)

"The Lick" in E minor played on the guitar, with the grace note on the first and fifth note

The Lick in different swing levels (straight, 60%, 70%, then 80%)

"The Lick" is a lick, or stock musical phrase, that has been used in numerous jazz, pop and classical compositions. It has been described as "the most famous jazz cliché ever". It has become an internet meme and is often used for comedic effect.

== Structure ==
"The Lick" consists of seven notes, using five steps on a diatonic scale. The interval pattern is 1 (unison) – 2 (major second) – ♭3 (minor third) – 4 (perfect fourth) – 2 (major second) – ♭7 (lower seventh) – 1 (unison). In jazz, it is played swung, sometimes including a glissando or grace note before the fifth note.

== History ==
The term "The Lick" was coined by a Facebook group in the 2010s and popularized by a YouTube video assembled from clips from the group by professor Alex Heitlinger in 2011. Tonal sequences similar to "The Lick" are found in classical music that predates jazz, such as The Firebird by Igor Stravinsky; however, it is primarily known as a jazz lick as it is commonly used in jazz improvisation. In 2019, the composer David Bruce used "The Lick" as a basis for a string quartet, the Lick Quartet.
