= G run =

Bluegrass guitar cadence

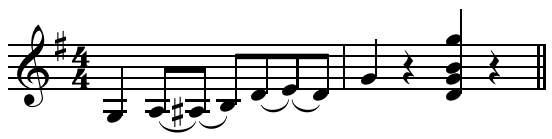
G run in G major variation contains both hammer-ons and a pull-off.

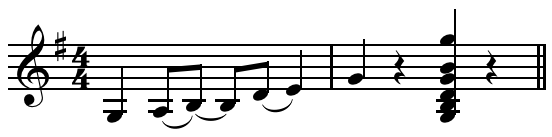
G run in G.

In bluegrass and other music, the G run (G-run), or Flatt run (presumably after Lester Flatt), is a stereotypical ending used as a basis for improvisation on the guitar. It is the most popular run in bluegrass, the second being "Shave and a Haircut".

The best known version, above, is a slight elaboration of the simplest form, below.

== See also ==
- Banjo roll
- Fill (music)
