= Sweep picking =

Guitar playing technique

Sweep picking is a guitar-playing technique. When sweep picking, the guitarist plays single notes on consecutive strings with a 'sweeping' motion of the pick, while using the fretting hand to produce a specific series of notes that are fast and fluid in sound. Both hands essentially perform an integral motion in unison to achieve the desired effect.

== History ==
The technique was first used and developed by jazz guitarists Les Paul, Chet Atkins, Tal Farlow and Barney Kessel in the 1950s, as well as rock guitarists Jan Akkerman, Ritchie Blackmore and Steve Hackett in the 1970s. In the 1980s, sweep picking became widely known for its use by shred guitarists. Jazz fusion guitarist Frank Gambale released several books and instructional videos about the technique, of which the most well-known is Monster Licks & Speed Picking in 1988.

== Application ==
Guitarists often use the technique to play arpeggios at high speed. A common fretting shape is the one- or two-octave stacked triad. In scalar terms, this is the first (tonic), third (mediant) and fifth (dominant) of a scale, played twice, with an additional tonic added at the high end. For example, an A minor stacked triad is A-C-E-A-C-E-A. When the guitarist plays such a series of notes quickly up and down as an arpeggio, the phrasing sounds typical of pianos and other instruments more associated with such arpeggios. Unlike pianos, woodwinds, and many other instruments, the guitarist can change key by moving the same arpeggio shape up and down the fretboard.

Compared to other techniques, such as alternate picking, sweep picking requires few strokes. In some instances, however, a guitarist uses hammer-ons and pull-offs to produce a legato sound instead of actual pick strokes. This applies when a certain string must sound two notes in the shape due to the natural limits of a fretted string instrument.

However, as with all guitar techniques, individual players may integrate sweep picking into existing repertoire and use it in an individually stylistic manner. Therefore, some guitarists use legato techniques and others double-pick multiple notes on a single string. A guitarist may continue a sweep to the next note by tapping to play passing notes outside the classic arpeggio. Sweep picking is not limited to a few note patterns. Guitarists can construct as many patterns as there are chords, and apply sweep picking to any idea—arpeggio or otherwise. These are separate yet related techniques that produce obvious differences in legato versus struck notes, as well as shift in the timing of the entire arpeggio. Furthering the idea, most players who master the basic sweep picking pattern use only parts of it, or alter the technique to achieve a certain lick. In this sense, sweep picking is not so much a concrete action such as the aforementioned alternate picking, but instead is a technical idea with many possible applications in all genres of music.
