= Shave and a Haircut =

Seven-note rhythm and melody

As a door knock

"Shave and a Haircut" and the associated response "two bits" is a seven-note musical call-and-response couplet, riff, or fanfare popularly used at the end of a musical performance, usually for comedic effect. It is used melodically (both in a minor or major key) or rhythmically, for example as a door knocker.

"Two bits" is a term in the United States and Canada for 25 cents, equivalent to a U.S. quarter. "Four bits" and "six bits" are also occasionally used, for example in the cheer "Two bits, four bits, six bits, a dollar." In the UK, it was often said as "five bob" (slang for five shillings), although words are now rarely used to accompany the rhythm or the tune.

== History ==
"At A Darktown Cake Walk" sheet music cover (1899)

At A Darktown Cake Walk

An early occurrence of the tune is from the introduction of the 1899 Charles Hale minstrel song "At A Darktown Cake Walk". Published in March 1899 by Belmont Music of Philadelphia, within 6 months, it sold 60,000 copies. Other songs from the same period also used the tune. The same notes form the bridge in the "Hot Scotch Rag", written by H. A. Fischler in 1911.

An early recording used the seven-note tune at both the beginning and the ending of a humorous 1915 song, by Billy Murray and the American Quartet, called "On the 5:15".

The tune features in part of the instrumental accompaniment to the 1925 Buster Keaton film Battling Butler. The tune is repeated multiple times from 23 minutes and 22 seconds until 23 minutes and 55 seconds.

In his 1933 novel, Hizzoner the Mayor, Joel Sayre wrote of boats "tooting the official Malta welcome blast to the tempo of 'Shave-and-a-haircut-two-bits, shave-and-a-haircut-two-bits, shave-and-a-haircut-two-bits'", which was soon taken up by every craft in the harbor that had a boiler.

In 1939, Dan Shapiro, Lestor Lee and Milton Berle released "Shave and a Haircut – Shampoo", which used the tune in the closing bars. In the same year, Rosalind Rosenthal and Herbert Halpert recorded "Shave and a Haircut, Bay Rum".

== Popularity ==
The tune can be heard on customized car horns, while the rhythm may be tapped as a door knock or as a Morse code "dah-dit-dit-dah-dit, dit dit" ( –··–· · ·) at the end of an amateur radio contact.

The former prisoner of war and U.S. Navy seaman Doug Hegdahl reports fellow U.S. captives in the Vietnam War would authenticate a new prisoner's U.S. identity by using "Shave and a Haircut" as a shibboleth, tapping the first five notes against a cell wall and waiting for the appropriate response. U.S. POWs were then able to communicate securely with one another via a tap code.

The tune has been used many times as a coda or ending in musical pieces. It is strongly associated with the stringed instruments of bluegrass music, particularly the 5-string banjo. Earl Scruggs often ended a song with this phrase or a variation of it. On the television show The Beverly Hillbillies, musical cues signifying the coming of a commercial break (cues which were in bluegrass style) frequently ended with "Shave and a Haircut". It is the second most popular bluegrass run, after the G run.

"Shave and a Haircut" was used in many early cartoons, particularly Looney Tunes cartoons and 1929 Mickey Mouse shorts. It was also used as an ending to many cartoon shows, just after the credits. Decades later, the couplet became a plot device in the film Who Framed Roger Rabbit: the villain Judge Doom repeatedly taps out "Shave and a Haircut" to lure Roger out of hiding, knowing that, as a cartoon character, Roger would be unable to resist finishing the melody with "two bits".

In the 1985 film The Breakfast Club, in the scene where Vernon claims he "heard a ruckus", the students tap the rhythm on their desks to divert his attention from Bender's sneaking out of solitary confinement - the hidden Bender knocks the 'two bits' of the phrase.

The tune was also featured in early Nokia phones, like the 3310 model, as the "That's it!" ringtone.

Music journalist Nardwuar ends each interview with "doot doola doot doo ..." (to the tune of "Shave and a Haircut"), to which the interviewee is expected to reply "doot doo!".

== Usage ==
The phrase has been incorporated into many recordings and performances. Notable examples include:

- "That's a Lot of Bunk", a 1920s novelty song composed by Al Wilson, James A. Brennan and Mack Henshaw, and performed by Billy Jones and Ernest Hare, known as "The Happiness Boys", closes with the riff.
- The Crazy Gang sang "How's your father? Goodbye!" to the same tune at the end of their 1937 movie O-Kay for Sound.
- Les Paul and Mary Ford's Capitol recording of "Magic Melody" concluded with the phrase minus the last two notes ("two bits"). Responding to complaints from disc jockeys, Capitol in 1955 released "Magic Melody Part 2"—consisting solely of the missing notes—on a 45, said to be the shortest tune on record.
- P. D. Q. Bach ends his "Blaues Gras" ("bluegrass") aria with "Shave and a Haircut", sung in Denglisch (mangled German and English): "Rasieren und Haarschneiden, zwei bitte" ("Shave and haircut, two please", ungrammatical in either language). "Zwei bitte" is a Denglisch pun, sounding like "two bits" to a speaker of both languages. The melody is also used in The Short-Tempered Clavier.
- In a 1960s television comedy sketch called "The Time Window", Mike Wallace interviews Victor Borge who is portraying composer and pianist Franz Liszt. During the segment, Borge (Liszt) states that his very first composition were two notes; which he plays on the piano. He next demonstrates that without these two notes "we would never have had this", and he plays "Shave and a Haircut".
- In the music video for the 2024 song, "Not Like Us" by Kendrick Lamar, the knock version of this melody is used in the beginning when Lamar uses the knock on a door answered by Tommy the Clown.

== Uses in other countries ==
The tune is used in Catalan with a different lyric: "Nas de barraca ... Sant Boi" ("Shack nose ... Sant Boi"). It is also tapped, as a door knock. The Catalan lyrics may come from Blanes, where it was sung twice with Nas de barraca. Sant Boi. Cinc de carmelos pel noi (Shack nose. Sant Boi. Five candies for the boy).

Italy also has its own lyrics to the tune, intended as a joke: "Ammazza la vecchia... col Flit" (i.e. "Kill the old lady with Flit"); Flit was a 1960s brand of insecticide spray, and the joke implies that the 'old lady' is just as bothersome and annoying as insects. It continues, with the same tune: "E se non basta, col gas" (and if it is not enough, use gas also).

In Irish barroom music, the tune is sometimes tagged at the end of a song. The performer sings the first part to the lyrics, "How is your aul' one?" (read: "old one", a slang term for mother), to which the audience replies, "Gameball!" (A slang term meaning okay).

== See also ==
- Banjo roll
- Oriental riff
- Bo Diddley beat
