= Guitar wiring =

Electrical wiring in guitars

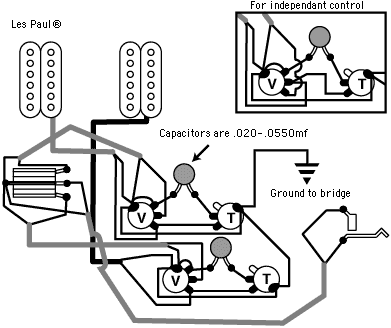
A diagram showing the wiring of a Gibson Les Paul electric guitar. Shown are the humbucker pickups with individual tone and volume controls (T and V, respectively), 3-way pickup selector switch, tone capacitors that form a passive low-pass filter, the output jack and connections between those components. The top right shows a modification that allows both pickups to have their volumes adjusted independently when the selector switch is in the middle position: the two bottom connections are simply swapped on each volume potentiometer.

Guitar wiring refers to the electrical components, and interconnections thereof, inside an electric guitar (and, by extension, other electric instruments like the bass guitar or mandolin). It most commonly consists of pickups, potentiometers to adjust volume and tone, a switch to select between different pickups (if the instrument has more than one), and the output socket. There may be additional controls for specific functions; the most common of these are described below.

== Electrical components ==
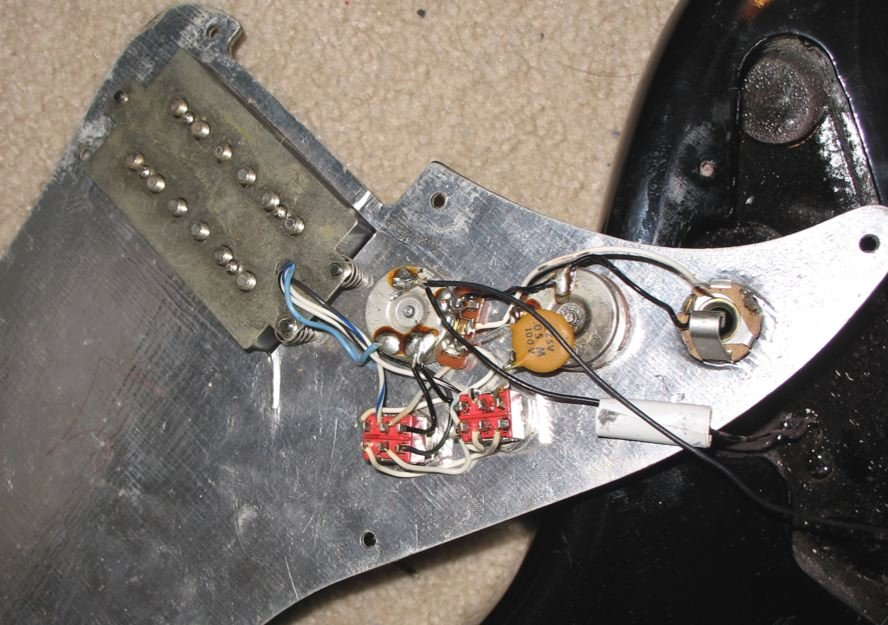
Underside of a 1981 Fender Lead I pickguard, showing the wiring.

The following section describes the most common components found inside an electric guitar.

=== Pickups ===
Pickups convert the mechanical energy of a vibrating string to an electrical signal, allowing it to be amplified, processed and reproduced. Pickups vary greatly in construction, size, types of materials used, as well as various electrical properties, but are generally divided into two categories – single-coil and double-coil (also known as humbucker).

=== Potentiometers ===
Potentiometers (often abbreviated as "pots") can be used to control a variety of functions inside an electric guitar. Most often they function as tone and volume controls, but can also blend two pickups together, attenuate one coil of a humbucker, and so on.

Potentiometers are differentiated by their electrical characteristics, of which the following are most important in an electric guitar:

- Value – the resistance between the two outer lugs. The most common values are 250 kΩ (for single-coil pickups) and 300–500 kΩ (for humbuckers), although values ranging from 50 kΩ to as high as 1 MΩ have been used. 25 kΩ pots are usually used with active electronics.
- Taper – the ratio of wiper travel to the resistance between the wiper and the outer lugs. Logarithmic pots (also known as "log" or "audio" pots, and designated with the letter A) are generally used for volume controls, due to the human ear's response to sound pressure being roughly logarithmic, whereas tone controls can employ both logarithmic and linear pots (designated with the letter B), depending on personal preferences and wiring arrangements. Reverse audio pots are sometimes used for volume controls on left-hand guitars, but this is not widespread due to the relative rarity of such pots.

Besides the common pots used for volume and tone controls, a number of specialised types exist:

- Push-pull pots – these pots incorporate an on-on DPDT switch on the underside of the pot that's actuated by pulling the shaft outwards and pushing it back in (hence the name). The switch is electrically independent from the pot and can be used for a number of functions.
- Push-push pots – a variation of the above, these pots also incorporate a switch which is activated and deactivated by pushing on the middle of the knob. This is used by Fender in their S-1 Switching System, and unlike push-pull pots, requires a special knob.
- No-load pots – also used by Fender, these pots have the clockwise lug disconnected from the resistive strip within, resulting in infinite resistance between the wiper and the other outer lug when turned fully clockwise. These are sometimes used as tone controls, to remove the load on the pickup(s) presented by the pot and the tone capacitor when turned to 10.
- Dual-gang pots – these are simply two pots stacked together, either with concentric shafts, allowing the independent control of two different parameters, or with a common shaft. The latter type can be used for blending the signals of two pickups together, and they usually feature a detent in the centre position.

=== Capacitors ===
Capacitors (often referred to as "caps") have several uses in electric guitars, the most common of which is in the tone control, where it combines with the potentiometer to form a low-pass filter, shorting all frequencies above the adjustable cut-off frequency to ground. Another common use is a small capacitor in parallel with the volume control, to prevent the loss of higher frequencies as the volume pot is turned down. This capacitor is commonly known as "treble bleed cap" and is sometimes accompanied by a series or parallel resistor to limit the amount of treble being retained and match it to the pot's taper.

A different take on the standard tone control is the Varitone circuit sometimes used on Gibson guitars (such as the Blueshawk). The Varitone is actually a variable notch filter consisting of one of several capacitors (selected with a rotary switch) in series with an inductor, forming an LC circuit. When placed between the signal and ground, this circuit starts to attenuate frequencies around its resonant frequency, as determined by the following formula:

$$f = { \omega \over 2 \pi } = {1 \over {2 \pi \sqrt{LC}}}$$

While this control is not very common in guitars, a number of aftermarket versions are available, both with and without an inductor (the latter being a simple low-pass filter with a movable cutoff frequency).

Capacitors used in electric guitars are differentiated by the following electrical characteristics:

- Capacitance – the amount of electrical energy the capacitor can store. Capacitors used for the tone circuit are usually in the 10–50 nF range, while treble bleed caps are smaller, usually 1–2 nF.
- Type – the dielectric used in the capacitor. Polyester and polypropylene are most common, with ceramic capacitors also being popular, especially in lower-end instruments. Reissues of vintage instruments often use reproductions of vintage paper capacitors, which are also popular aftermarket replacements. Finally, audiophile-grade polypropylene film and foil capacitors are sometimes used in custom instruments, although their size can prove problematic as they're designed for use in audio amplifiers and consequently have working voltages in excess of 500 V, far higher than anything encountered inside an electric guitar.

== Custom wiring modifications ==
There are countless ways to modify the wiring of an electric guitar. Some of the more popular modifications are described below.

=== Coil splitting ===
A humbucker pickup is electrically equivalent to two single-coil pickups wired together in series. Coil splitting involves shorting one of the coils to ground, essentially turning the humbucker into a single-coil pickup (not a perfect replica, though, as the magnetic circuits of the two pickup types are different). This is usually done with a DPDT switch, but can also be done with a push-pull pot. Some manufacturers have used a pot to vary the amount of signal shorted to ground from one coil, thus producing a range of tones between a humbucker and a single-coil. Coil splitting results in a sound that's brighter and has less output than a full humbucker. It also eliminates the humbucker's noise-cancelling properties. This modification requires the start and end of both coils to be exposed, which is more commonly available on aftermarket than stock pickups.

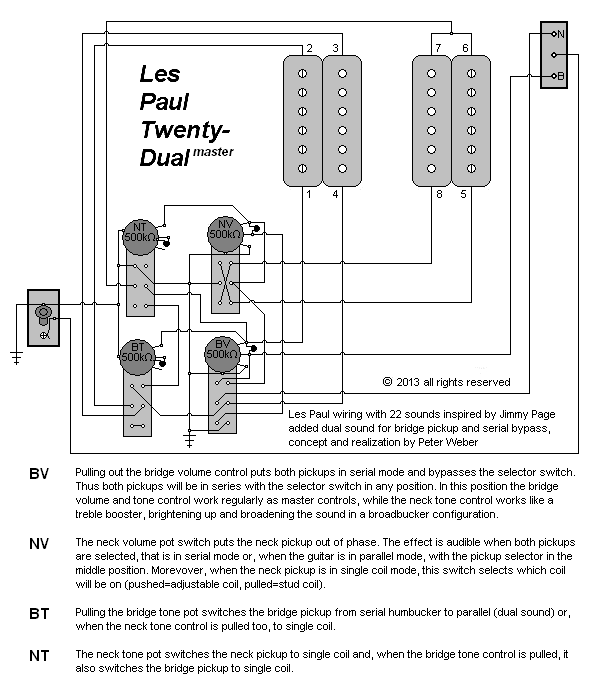
A diagram showing a wiring modification for a Les Paul or a similar electric guitar with two humbuckers. Wiring schemes using four push-pull pots for additional pickup combinations were made popular by Led Zeppelin guitarist Jimmy Page and later produced as a signature model by Gibson. The modification shown in this diagram is an evolution of the original concept combining coil splitting, phase cancellation and parallel/series switching for a total of 22 different pickup combinations.

This modification is commonly (and incorrectly) referred to as "coil tap", which actually involves bypassing part of a pickup's coil using a tap point on the coil. This also serves to reduce the pickup's output and change its sound, but is found only on single coil pickups (and even then rarely).

=== Phase cancellation ===
Another popular modification is to reverse the electric polarity of one of the pickups (or one coil of a dual-coil pickup). When two pickups are selected, this produces a very thin and weak sound, due to phase cancellation between the pickups. The closer the pickups are to each other, the greater the cancellation and thus the weaker and thinner the resulting sound. In case of a humbucker this results in a sound that is so weak as to be almost unusable, as well as the loss of the pickup's hum-cancelling properties (due to the coils being magnetically out-of-phase, but electrically in-phase with each other).

A way to increase the usability of the sound acquired this way is to wire a capacitor in series with the pickup that has its electric polarity reversed. This filters out that pickup's lower frequencies and thus preserves the corresponding frequencies from the other pickup. The resulting sound is fuller and stronger, yet still different from the standard in-phase combinations, resembling the sound of a "cocked wah" (a wah-wah pedal set in a fixed position). The capacitor used for this is usually in the 20–100 nF range.

Unintentional phase cancellation can also occur if a guitar's pickups are wired incorrectly, or if a new pickup installed in the guitar has different magnetic or electric polarity from the one it replaced. To fix this, the pickup's magnetic or electric polarity needs to be reversed (which one exactly depends on the respective polarities of the other pickup(s) and whether or not hum-cancelling combinations are desired). While the latter is usually a small matter of reversing the pickup's hot and ground wires, the former may be more difficult, especially if it requires the magnet(s) to be removed and reinstalled in a different orientation, a process which can damage the pickup and render it unusable if not done carefully. This is the case with most humbuckers. On the other hand, single-coil pickups with magnetic polepieces can simply be repolarised by applying a strong enough external magnetic field.

=== Parallel/series switching ===
While most single-coil pickups are wired in parallel with each other, it is possible to wire two or more of them in series, producing a fuller and stronger sound not unlike that of a humbucker. This is a popular modification for instruments with two single-coil pickups like the Fender Telecaster and the Fender Jazz Bass. For the former, special 4-way switches are available to replace the stock 3-way switch and provide a series wiring position.

Likewise, the two coils of a humbucker which are wired in series can be connected in parallel. This results in a brighter sound and lower output resembling that of a single-coil pickup. Compared to coil split the sound is usually a bit fuller and the pickup's hum-cancelling properties are retained. Like coil split, wiring a humbucker in parallel requires the start and end of both coils to be accessible, which is sometimes possible with stock pickups. Unlike coil split, it also requires a DPDT switch (coil split only requires a SPDT switch).

=== Blend potentiometers ===
Blend potentiometers (essentially two potentiometers ganged on the same shaft) allow blending together two pickups in varying degrees. The operation is the same as in a balance control found in stereo equipment – in the middle position (often marked with a detent) both pickups supply their full output, and turning the pot in either direction gradually attenuates one of the pickups while leaving the other at full output.

Blend potentiometers are a popular modification to instruments with separate volume controls for pickups, no master volume and/or no pickup selector. For instance, on the Fender Jazz Bass, the dual volume controls can be replaced with blend and master volume controls, to allow the instrument's output level to be adjusted with just one knob while still retaining the various combinations of the two pickups blended together.

=== Active electronics ===
While the modifications described above have all been passive (i.e. they don't require an external power source), active electronics considerably increase the number of possible wiring options. These can range from simple preamps that offer a volume boost and buffer the instrument's signal (to prevent loss of higher frequencies in longer cable runs), to multi-band equalisers and more. Enterprising guitarists have even built entire effects processors into guitars, such as the Korg Kaoss Pad.

The main downside to active electronics is that they require power to operate. This is most often provided by a 9 V battery, but can also be phantom power from an external source, delivered over the guitar cable.

== Manufacturers ==
A list of popular manufacturers of guitar components follows.

- Seymour Duncan (pickups, effect pedals)
- DiMarzio (pickups, accessories)
- EMG, Inc. (active pickups and electronics, accessories)
- Bourns (potentiometers, switches)
- Switchcraft (switches)
- Vishay (capacitors, misc. electronic components)
- Neutrik (plugs, jacks)

== See also ==
- Electric guitar
- Pickup (music technology)
- Potentiometer
- Capacitor
