= Classical guitar technique =

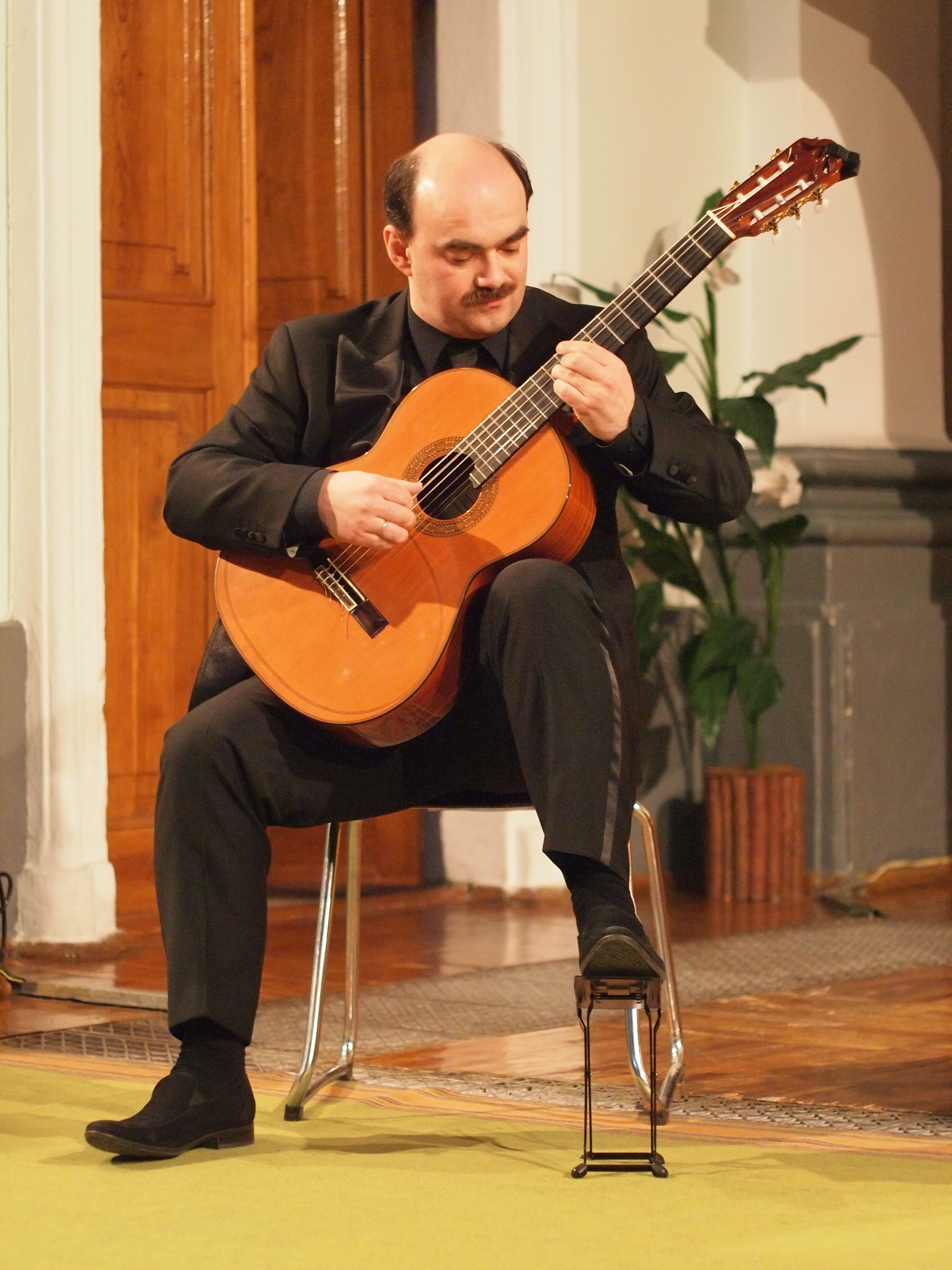
Andrey Ostapenko performing a recital.

In classical guitar, the right hand is developed in such a way that it can sustain two, three, and four voice harmonies while also paying special attention to tone production. The index (i), middle (m), and ring (a) fingers are generally used to play the melody, while the thumb (p) accompanies in the bass register adding harmony and produces a comparable texture and effect to that of the piano. The classical guitar is a solo polyphonic instrument.

Classical guitar techniques can be organized broadly into subsections for the right hand, the left hand, and miscellaneous techniques. In guitar, performance elements such as musical dynamics (loudness or softness) and tonal/timbral variation are mostly determined by the hand that physically produces the sound. In other words, the hand that plucks the strings defines the musical expression. Historically, this role has been assigned to the dominant hand which, for the majority of players, is the right hand. Similar reasoning is behind string players using the right hand for controlling the bow. In the following article the role of the hands should be reversed when considering left-handed players.

An introductory overview of classical guitar technique is given in the article Classical guitar.

== Posture ==
Key considerations in choosing a playing position include:

- Ensuring the physical stability of the instrument.
- Allowing both hands full freedom to meet all technical demands without having to support the guitar.
- Minimizing muscular tension and physical stress by adopting a comfortable and balanced body position.

=== Foot stool ===
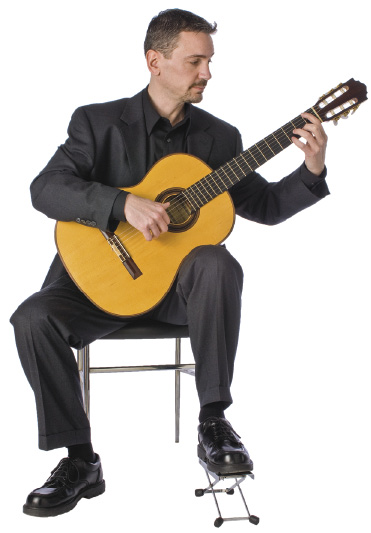
A guitarist demonstrating traditional classical guitar posture

In the traditional position, the player sits at the front of the chair with the left foot supported by a foot stool or similar device. This support elevates the left leg so that the guitar can rest comfortably on it while the right elbow is placed on the guitar's body, allowing the right hand to fall naturally over the strings at an effective angle. The right foot tucks underneath the player to create additional space, and the guitar is rotated slightly to rest against the player's right side.

=== Guitar supports on leg(s) ===
Several guitar supports have been designed to facilitate a posture recommended by the Alexander Technique, which promotes a straight, untwisted spine, level shoulders, horizontal upper legs, and both feet flat on the floor. These supports position the guitar correctly above the legs, relieving the player from having to contort their body to support the instrument.

=== Tripods ===
Some guitarists use tripods to support their instrument. A notable historical example is the tripod used by Dionisio Aguado y García, as depicted in lithographs from his era. Tripods can help maintain an ideal playing angle while reducing physical strain.

=== Straps ===
Although more common on steel-string and electric guitars, some advocates suggest that straps can also be useful for classical guitars—especially early instruments or for specific performance circumstances.

=== Endpins ===
Some performers, such as Paul Galbraith, use a cello-like endpin arrangement to support the instrument. This method can offer a stable playing position while reducing tension in the shoulders and back.

== Playing techniques ==
Over the history of the guitar, many schools of technique have emerged, often associated with the virtuosos of their time. For example, Mauro Giuliani (1781–1829) is closely associated with arpeggio playing; his compositions frequently incorporate intricate arpeggio passages, and his "120 Right Hand Studies" were developed as a method to achieve greater independence among the right-hand fingers.

In contrast, Andrés Segovia maintained that rigorous scale practice—such as playing scales for two hours a day—was essential for correcting faulty hand positions and building a solid technical foundation. Both approaches underscore that mastery of the classical guitar relies on extensive, repetitive practice, whether through free-stroke arpeggio exercises or the rest-stroke techniques favored by Segovia.

As Fernando Sor did in the early nineteenth century, several twentieth century pedagogues have outlined principles and technique based on the study of anatomy to make 'inherent kinesthetic tendencies' ("our limitations") of the human body work for the player. The intention being production of "a musical, articulated sound within our physical limitations". The basis of such technique is referred to by Charles Duncan as "the awareness of the release of tension".

== Fingering notation ==
Traditionally the names of the right-hand fingers are described using the Spanish terms pulgar, índice, medio, and anular, derived from Latin. They are generally abbreviated as p, i, m, and a, with "p" representing the thumb, "i" index, "m" middle and "a" representing the ring finger; "x" and "c" are sometimes used for the little finger (also known as "chiquito").

The four fingers of the left hand, which are used to stop the strings, are typically designated as 1 (first), 2 (second), 3 (third), and 4 (fourth or little finger). The thumb is not numbered. The numeral 0 is used to designate an open string (a string that is not pressed down). On the classical guitar, the left-hand thumb is rarely used to stop strings due to the instrument's wide neck and the conventional hand position in classical technique.

In standard musical notation for the classical guitar, scores (as opposed to tablatures) do not systematically indicate which string should be plucked; the performer usually deduces the appropriate string from context. When string designation is necessary, the strings are numbered 1 to 6 (with 1 representing the high E and 6 the low E), typically indicated by the number enclosed in a circle.

Similarly, the fret or position where the first finger of the left hand is placed on the fingerboard is usually not indicated in the score. However, when needed (especially for executing barré chords), Roman numerals may be used to indicate the position, counted from the nut (position 0) towards the bridge.

== Right hand technique ==
The two primary plucking techniques are:

- Rest-stroke (apoyando), in which the finger that plucks the string lands on the next string; and
- Free-stroke (tirando), in which the finger does not land on the string behind, but rather continues until the energy of the stroke is dissipated.

Rest stroke is useful for single-line melody playing and tonal accent and emphasis, while free-stroke is the more fundamental technique and is used more frequently in most musical contexts (chords, arpeggios, double stops and melody). The strokes are often combined to provide contrasting voices between melody and harmony; "rest-stroke on the melody" is a common approach to balancing the voices.

One of the tenets of right-hand technique in melody playing is strict alternation of the index (i) and middle (m) fingers—that is, no right-hand finger (excluding the thumb) should be used twice in a row. The ring finger (a) is occasionally used if strict i–m alternation creates awkward string-crossings. When the ring finger is incorporated, i–a or a–m fingering is generally preferred over m–a, due to the physical constraints of the hand. Several reasons are given for the use of alternating fingers including accuracy, speed and rhythmic clarity.

- Scale playing: Typically, the index and middle fingers are used in alternation. However, other combinations that incorporate the ring finger—or even the thumb—are common, depending on the speed of the scale and the melodic progression across strings. In slower, contrapuntal passages, guitarists may deviate from strict alternation to preserve tonal similarity. For example, one may use the index (or thumb) on one string for a melody line while using the ring finger on another string.

Historically, from the Baroque era through the classical/romantic repertoire of Sor and Mertz, the free-stroke was predominant. One of the first classical guitarists to adopt the rest-stroke was the Spaniard Julian Arcas (1832–1882) (and it may have been used by Jose Ciebra as well), though rest-stroke was already common in flamenco.

The choice of stroke is ultimately motivated by the musical context and by personal preference regarding tone quality, dynamic control, and efficiency.

=== Preparation ===
"Preparation" refers to the act of positioning the finger on the string so that both the flesh and a portion of the nail make contact with the string before the plucking motion. This technique produces a more articulate sound and is a concept found in other plucked instruments as well.

==== Tremolo ====
Tremolo is the rapid reiteration of a string by repeatedly plucking it—often with the same finger—in quick succession. In tremolo playing, although there is still a preparatory contact with the string, that preparation becomes less perceptible as speed increases. Common finger patterns used for tremolo include:

- "p, m, i" for slower, three-note tremolos with the melody typically played by the thumb.
- "p, a, i" for faster three-note tremolos with the melody in the thumb.
- "p, a, m, i" for a four-note tremolo with the melody in the thumb.
- "p, i, a, m, i" or "p, m, a, m, i" for five-note tremolos (almost exclusively used in flamenco). The pattern "p, c, a, m, i" is rarely used since the little finger (c) is less frequently employed.

==== Arpeggiation ====
Consecutive string arpeggiation technique involves plucking the strings separately in a (usually) predetermined sequence. A typical pattern begins with the thumb (p) on a bass string and the index (i), middle (m), and ring (a) fingers on three successive treble strings. Common finger patterns for arpeggiation include:

- "p, a, m, i"
- "p, i, m, a"
- "p, a, m, i, m, a"
- "p, i, m, a, m, i"

=== Nails ===
Modern practice typically combines the use of the right-hand nails with the flesh of the fingertips to pluck the strings. In the 19th century, many influential guitarists such as Fernando Sor, Francisco Tárrega, and his pupil Emilio Pujol played primarily using the flesh of the fingertips, following techniques similar to those used in lute playing. This approach was easier with gut strings due to their textured surface but became more challenging with the smoother nylon strings introduced later. The typical plucking action involves first contacting the string with the fingertip, then the nail, and finally allowing the string to glide along the curvature of the nail until it is released.

=== Strumming ===
- Rasgueado is a Spanish term referring to various strumming techniques used in both flamenco and classical guitar. This technique involves rapidly striking the strings using the backs of the fingernails in sequence to create a cascading sound effect. Different combinations of finger and thumb strokes allow for various rhythmic patterns and dynamic accents.
- In some approaches, the palm-side of the thumb joint is used to lightly strum the strings for a soft, muted effect, while the thumb nail may be used for a brighter, more pronounced strum.
- Certain techniques involve combining the thumb with the fingers to create layered rhythmic patterns, such as having the thumb strike the lower strings and the fingers pluck the upper strings in rapid succession.

== Left hand technique ==
While the right hand is responsible for the sound of the guitar, the left hand performs two functions: pressing on the strings (to shorten their effective length and change the pitch) and articulation, i.e. slurring (commonly known as "hammer-ons" and "pull-offs") and vibrato. In musical notation, the left-hand fingers are referred to as 1, 2, 3, and 4 (starting with the index).

Unlike many players of steel-string and electric guitars, which have a narrower fingerboard, classical guitarists do not place their left-hand thumbs over the top of the neck. Instead, they place them behind the neck, usually behind the second finger.

It is possible to play the same note on different strings, a process known as "registration" or "registering". For example, the note "e" (the 1st string open) may be played, or "registered" on any string.

The guitarist often has choices of where to "register" notes on the guitar based on:

- Ease of fingering. Beginners learn the open, first position before anything else and might be more comfortable registering notes on open strings in the first position. Advanced players might choose higher positions based on musical expression or using a shift on a string as a guide.
- Playing "on the string" – keeping a melody or musical line on one string for continuity of tone or expression.
- The advent of nylon strings. Historically, early guitars (pre‑WWII) were strung with catgut rather than the nylon commonly used today.
- For reasons of counterpoint: allowing a sustained voice on one string while a moving voice is played on another.

=== Slurs ===
Slurs, trills, and other ornaments are often executed entirely with the left hand. For example, in an ascending semitone slur (a hammer-on), a note stopped by the first finger at the fifth fret is played normally, then, without any further action from the right hand, the second finger is placed at the sixth fret on the same string, raising the still-ringing note by a semitone. A descending slur (a pull-off) works in the opposite manner; the higher note is played and then the finger is lifted to allow the lower note (already in position) to sound, sometimes with the active finger plucking the string as it lifts. Three specific descending slurs exist: (1) the active finger lifts directly off the string, (2) the active finger rests against the adjacent string immediately afterward, and (3) a hybrid approach in which the finger briefly bumps the adjacent string before lifting. Repeating these techniques can create a trill, and sometimes alternating fingers (for example, 2–1–3–1) is used for variation.

=== Vibrato ===
The classical guitar vibrato is executed by rocking the tip of the left-hand finger(s) back and forth horizontally within the same fret space (along the string axis, rather than across it as in a vertical bend common in rock or blues). This produces a subtle variation in pitch, both sharper and flatter than the starting note, without significantly altering the fundamental tone.

=== Harmonics ===
Natural harmonics are produced by lightly touching a left-hand finger on specific points along an open string without pressing it down, then plucking the string with the right hand. The left hand must be positioned at a nodal point along the string—typically at divisions such as the 12th fret (one octave higher than the open string) or the 7th fret (one octave and a fifth above the open string).

Artificial harmonics are produced by stopping the string normally with the left hand, then using the right-hand index finger to lightly touch the string at a nodal point (commonly 5, 7, 9, or 12 frets above the left-hand finger) while plucking with another right-hand finger (often the ring finger or thumb).

=== Left-hand position ===
In passage work and scale playing each finger of the left hand can be assigned to a single fret. Thus each hand position spans four frets (equaling a minor third interval on single string) whilst the left hand remains stationary. This “one-fret-per-finger” guideline means that three hand positions (covering frets 1–4, 5–8, and 9–12) combined with the open string can sound a full 12‑fret octave on each string. In execution of harmony work, two or more fingers may be required to simultaneously fret different strings at the same fret, and therefore the preceding covering range of a four fret span will not apply.

Classical guitar playing uses formal left-hand positions. The "nth position" indicates that the hand is positioned with the first finger over the nth fret.

== See also ==
- Classical guitar pedagogy
