= Four-string guitar =

There are many instruments which can be or are commonly referred to as four string guitars.

== Guitar family instruments with four strings ==
- Bass guitar
- Braguinha
- Cak used in Kroncong music
- Cavaquinho
- Celovic used in Tamburica orchestras
- Cuatro Venezolano
- Tenor guitar
- Ukulele
- Cigar box guitars often have three or four strings.
- Duitara used in Khasi music

== Guitar family instruments with four courses of strings ==
- The Renaissance guitar.
- Brac and Bugaria used in Tamburica orchestras
- Some Chitarra Battentes
- Some Kabosys
- Tahitian ukulele
- Tiple
