= Tirando =

Method of plucking used in classical guitar

Tirando is a method of plucking used in classical guitar and flamenco guitar. Tirando is Spanish for "pulling" (in English, it is also called a "free stroke"). After plucking, the finger does not touch the string that is next lowest in pitch (physically higher) on the guitar, as it does with apoyando.
