= Apoyando =

Apoyando ("supporting") is a method of brushing the string used in both classical guitar and flamenco guitar known in English as "rest stroke." The rest stroke gets its name because after brushing the string, the finger rests on the adjacent string after it follows through, giving a slightly rounder, often punchier sound (contrasted with tirando). Harpsichord strings are plucked, normally, in classical guitar style, strings are brushed with skin and nail, unless a particular tonal color is required.
