= String skipping =

Guitar playing technique

String skipping is a guitar-playing technique that is used mainly for solos and complex riffs in rock and heavy metal songs.

== Technique ==
String skipping is a method of achieving a guitar sound that is different from more traditional solo lick styles. In more traditional styles, the guitarist will often play several notes on one string, then move to the adjacent one, improvising on the fretboard in a melodically linear manner. In string skipping (as the name implies), a string is often skipped during the riff. Essentially, this technique is used to introduce larger intervals than are usually common in guitar melodies, thereby creating melodic interest.

=== Example of "traditional" solo riff style ===
     1 2 3 4 5 6 7 8   1 2 3 4 5 6 7 8   1 2 3 4 5 6 7 8   1 2 3 4 5 6 7 8
e|-|-------------3---|---------------2-|-----------3-2---|-----------------| 
B|-|---------3-5---3-|-------------3---|---------------5-|-5---------------|
G|4|---2-4-5---------|-----------4-----|---------------^^^^^HOLD-----------|
D|4|-----------------|-----------------|-----------------|-----------------|
A|-|-----------------|-----------------|-----------------|-----------------|
E|-|-----------------|-----------------|-----------------|-----------------|

=== Example of string skipping style ===
---------------|--------------7--|
------------5--|------7^8--10----|
---------2-----|-----------------|
---------------|----9------------|
------3--------|-5---------------|
---------------|-----------------|

Notice that not every note played represents a string-skip; it is usually the case that string skipping is interwoven with traditional adjacent riffing. Playing the above example, one can hear the difference; the string skipping makes the solo stand out.

One example of string skipping involves string bending on the 7th fret of the G string, then jumping to the 8th fret of the E string (skipping the B string). Another way to achieve the desired aesthetic is when playing a thrash riff while chugging open E's, to pick strings E, B, G, or D to play extra notes in the riff.

== Examples ==
One of the most famous examples of string skipping is the intro riff to "Sweet Child o' Mine" by Guns N' Roses: the fifth and seventh notes of each arpeggio are played on the top string, while the sixth and eighth notes are on the 3rd string. Guitarist Shawn Lane utilized string skipping throughout the instrumental pieces "Get You Back" and "Not Again", among others on the Powers of Ten album.

Another specific example of string skipping can be heard in the instrumental piece "Cliffs of Dover" by Eric Johnson, during the intro (measures 6 and 7). Johnson has said that string skipping is an important part of his soloing. Johnson refers to executing "wider intervals" with the method, and also says with skipping, you're sometimes "replacing certain notes into another octave." He mentions it "gets a little more interesting" when the guitarist comes across a note normally fretted, that can be replaced with the open string version (played instead on a "skipped" string).

Guitarist Paul Gilbert (of Mr. Big, Racer X, and G3) often employs string skipping. A video example of string skipping is provided below in the external links.
