= Lick (music) =

Stock pattern or phrase; short series of notes

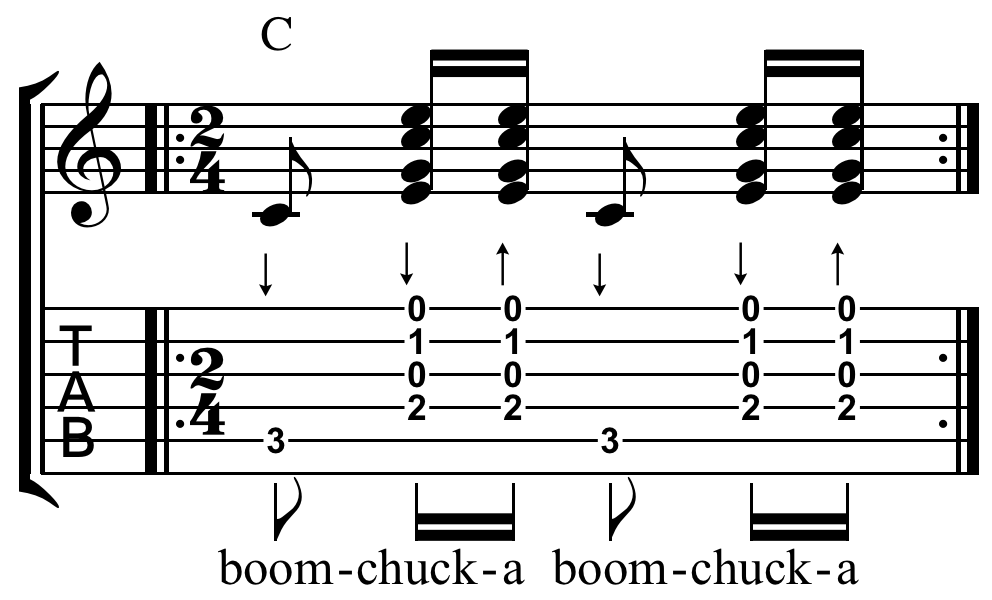
Carter-style lick.

In popular music genres such as country, blues, jazz or rock music, a lick is "a stock pattern or phrase" consisting of a short series of notes used in solos and melodic lines and accompaniment. For musicians, learning a lick is usually a form of imitation. By imitating, musicians understand and analyze what others have done, allowing them to build a vocabulary of their own.

In a jazz band, a lick may be performed during an improvised solo, either during an accompanied solo chorus or during an unaccompanied solo break. Jazz licks are usually original short phrases which can be altered so they can be used over a song's changing harmonic progressions.

== Similar concepts ==
A lick is different from the related concept of a riff, as riffs can include repeated chord progressions. Licks are more often associated with single-voice melodic lines than with chord progressions. However, like riffs, licks can be the basis of an entire song. Single-line riffs or licks used as the basis of Western classical music pieces are called ostinatos. Contemporary jazz writers also use riff- or lick-like ostinatos in modal music and Latin jazz. Imitating style is as important as learning the appropriate scale over a given chord. Licks in rock and roll are often used through a formula, and variations technique in which variants of simple, stock ideas are blended and developed during the solo.

A lick can be a hook, if the lick meets the definition of a hook: "a musical idea, a passage or phrase, that is believed to be appealing and make the song stand out", and "catch the ear of the listener". A lick may be incorporated into a fill, which is a short passage played in the pause between phrases of a melody.

== See also ==
- The Lick
- Vamp (music)
- Melodic pattern
- Phrase (music)
