= Pull-off =

Stringed instrument playing technique

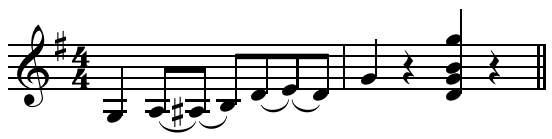
G run in G major variation contains both hammer-ons and a pull-off.

A pull-off is a stringed instrument playing and articulation technique performed by plucking or "pulling" the finger that is grasping the sounding part of a string off the fingerboard of either a fretted or unfretted instrument. This intermediate- to advanced playing technique is done using the tip of a finger or fingernail on the fretting hand. Pull-offs are done to facilitate the playing of embellishments and ornaments such as grace notes. Pull-offs may be notated in sheet music or improvised by the performer, depending on the musical style and context.

== Performance and effect ==
A guitarist performs a mixture of pull-offs, hammer-ons, and slides.

A pull-off is performed on a string which is already vibrating; when the fretting finger is pulled off (exposing the string either as open or as stopped by another fretting finger "lower" on the same string, with "lower" meaning in a position that is lower in pitch) the note playing on the string changes to the new, longer vibrating length of the string. Pull-offs are performed on both fretted instruments (e.g., electric guitar) and unfretted instruments (e.g., violin). They are used to sound grace notes with the transition from one note to the other sounding gentler and less percussive because the string is not picked or bowed again by the typical picking/bowing hand to produce the sound of the second note.

A succession of photos shows a pull-off being performed on guitar.

In the transition between the initial and final notes, the string may vibrate in an inharmonic manner for several cycles if it is plucked with the fretting finger, because the string is being plucked in a part of the string not usually used for plucking. The result, a slight "quack" sound, may be particularly audible when the interval of the pull-off is large. This transition also consumes some of the vibrational energy in the sounded string, with the effect that the second note is generally much quieter than the original. On a low-pitched string that is being bowed on a stopped note, say, at the halfway point of the vibrating string length, the player may left-hand flick the string immediately prior to sounding the deep-pitched open string to help the string "speak". Without the left-hand "flick", there could be a half-second delay in the sounding of the deep fundamental.

=== Acoustic versus electric instruments ===
On most acoustic instruments, this means the second note has little sustain. As a result, in acoustic music, pull-offs are primarily used as an embellishment. Performers of plucked instruments tend to use "pull-offs" when playing grace notes, usually in conjunction with multiple hammer-ons and strumming or picking to produce a rapid, rippling effect. In rock and heavy metal music, electric guitars are often performed with overdriven amplifiers and/or guitar effects such as distortion pedals and compression pedals are used, which add substantial sustain to the sound. With this type of electronic gear and a powerful instrument amplifier nearing the threshold of feedback, pull-offs can even be used to play sustained notes.

In a variation of the technique, often called a "flick-off", the pulling-off finger is dragged slightly across the face of the string while performing the pull-off. This results in the string being gently sounded, either by the player's finger callus or by their fretting-finger fingernail. This increases the volume and sustain of the pulled-off note, although the sound of the fretting finger dragging over the string may be audible on both an amplified instrument and on a brightly strung acoustic instrument.

=== Left-hand pizzicato ===
Classical music of the late romantic period features numerous applications of the technique to bowed string instruments such as the violin, viola, cello, and double bass. In the classical context, the term is referred to as left-handed pizzicato.

When a player switches from arco (bowing) to regular pizzicato, the player normally requires a short pause to switch his or her bowing hand into pizzicato position and pluck the string. With left-hand pizzicato, though, a string player can play a pizzicato note immediately following a bowed note; thus, left-hand pizzicato provides a means to intersperse pizzicato notes into rapid passages of bowed notes. The string on which the note is played may be either open or stopped (fingered); the only requirement for using the technique on a stopped string is that the finger stopping the string be lower than the finger plucking the string.

Left-hand pizzicato appears most prominently in violin "virtuoso pieces" such as Pablo de Sarasate's Zigeunerweisen and Paganini's 24th Caprice.

== Etymology ==
The term pull-off was invented and popularized by Pete Seeger in his book How to Play the 5-String Banjo. Seeger also invented the term hammer-on.
