= Power chord =

Type of guitar chord

Component intervals from root
- perfect fifth
- root

Tuning
- 2:3:4

E5 power chord in eighth notes

A power chord, also called a fifth chord, is a colloquial name for a chord played on guitar, especially on electric guitar, which consists of the root note and the fifth, as well as possibly octaves of those notes.

Power chords are commonly played with an amp with intentionally added distortion or overdrive effects. Power chords are a key element of many styles of rock, especially heavy metal and punk rock.

== Analysis ==
When two or more notes are played through a distortion process that non-linearly transforms the audio signal, additional partials are generated at the sums and differences of the frequencies of the harmonics of those notes (intermodulation distortion). When a typical chord containing such intervals (for example, a major or minor chord) is played through distortion, the number of different frequencies generated, and the complex ratios between them, can make the resulting sound messy and indistinct. This effect is accentuated as most guitars are tuned based on equal temperament, with the result that minor thirds are narrower, and major thirds wider, than they would be in just intonation.

However, in a power chord, the ratio between the frequencies of the root and fifth are very close to the just interval 3:2. When played through distortion, the intermodulation leads to the production of partials closely related in frequency to the harmonics of the original two notes, producing a more coherent sound. The intermodulation makes the spectrum of the sound expand in both directions, and with enough distortion, a new fundamental frequency component appears an octave lower than the root note of the chord played without distortion, giving a richer, more bassy and more subjectively "powerful" sound than the undistorted signal. Even when played without distortion, the simple ratios between the harmonics in the notes of a power chord can give a stark and powerful sound, owing to the resultant tone (combination tone) effect. Power chords also have the advantage of being relatively easy to play, allowing fast chord changes and easy incorporation into melodies and riffs.

== Terminology ==
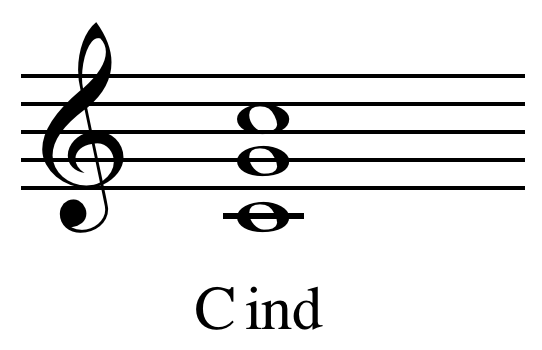
In a triadic context, chords with omitted thirds may be considered "indeterminate" triads.

Power chords are most commonly notated 5 or (no 3). For example, "C5" or "C(no 3)" refer to playing the root (C) and fifth (G). These can be inverted, so that the G is played below the C (making an interval of a fourth). They can also be played with octave doublings of the root or fifth note, which makes a sound that is subjectively higher pitched with less power in the low frequencies, but still retains the character of a power chord.

Another notation is ind, designating the chord as "indeterminate". This refers to the fact that a power chord is neither major nor minor, as there is no third present. This gives the power chord a chameleon-like property; if played where a major chord might be expected, it can sound like a major chord, but when played where a minor chord might be expected, it can sound minor.

== History ==
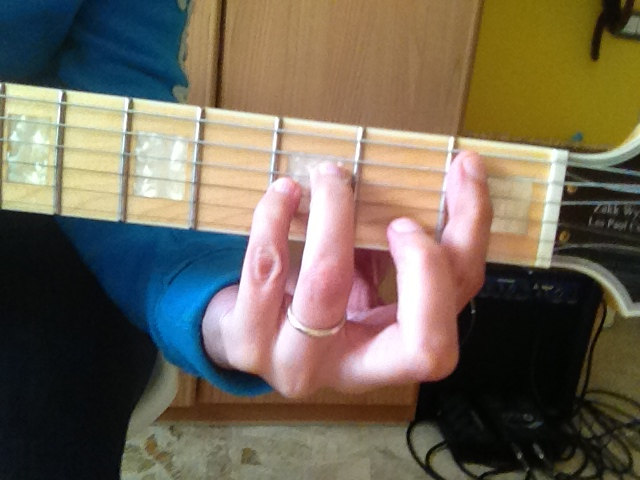
A power chord being fretted

The first written instance of a power chord for guitar in the 20th century is to be found in the "Preludes" of Heitor Villa-Lobos, a Brazilian composer of the early twentieth century. Although classical guitar composer Francisco Tárrega used it before him, modern musicians use Villa-Lobos's version to this day. Power chords' use in rock music can be traced back to commercial recordings in the 1950s. Robert Palmer pointed to electric blues guitarists Willie Johnson and Pat Hare, both of whom played for Sun Records in the early 1950s, as the true originators of the power chord, citing as evidence Johnson's playing on Howlin' Wolf's "How Many More Years" (recorded 1951) and Hare's playing on James Cotton's "Cotton Crop Blues" (recorded 1954). Scotty Moore opened Elvis Presley's 1957 hit "Jailhouse Rock" with power chords. The "power chord" as known to modern electric guitarists was popularized first by Link Wray, who built on the distorted electric guitar sound of early records and by tearing the speaker cone in his 1958 instrumental "Rumble."

A later hit song built around power chords was "You Really Got Me" by the Kinks, released in 1964. This song's riffs exhibit fast power-chord changes. The Who's guitarist, Pete Townshend, performed power chords with a theatrical windmill-strum, for example in "My Generation". On King Crimson's Red album, Robert Fripp thrashed with power chords. Power chords are important in many forms of punk rock music, popularized in the genre by Ramones guitarist Johnny Ramone. Many punk guitarists used only power chords in their songs, most notably Billie Joe Armstrong and Doyle Wolfgang von Frankenstein.

== Techniques ==
Power chords are often performed within a single octave, as this results in the closest matching of overtones. Octave doubling is sometimes done in power chords. Power chords are often pitched in a middle register.

Shown above are four examples of an F5 chord. The letter names above the chords only indicate which different voicing is being used, and should not be conflated with the chord names typically used in popular music (e.g., C Major, B minor, etc.) A common voicing is the 1–5 perfect fifth (A), to which the octave can be added, 1-5-1 (B). A perfect fourth 5-1 (C) is also a power chord, as it implies the "missing" lower 1 pitch. Either or both of the pitches may be doubled an octave above or below (D is 5-1-5-1), which leads to another common variation, 5-1-5 (not shown).

=== Spider chords ===
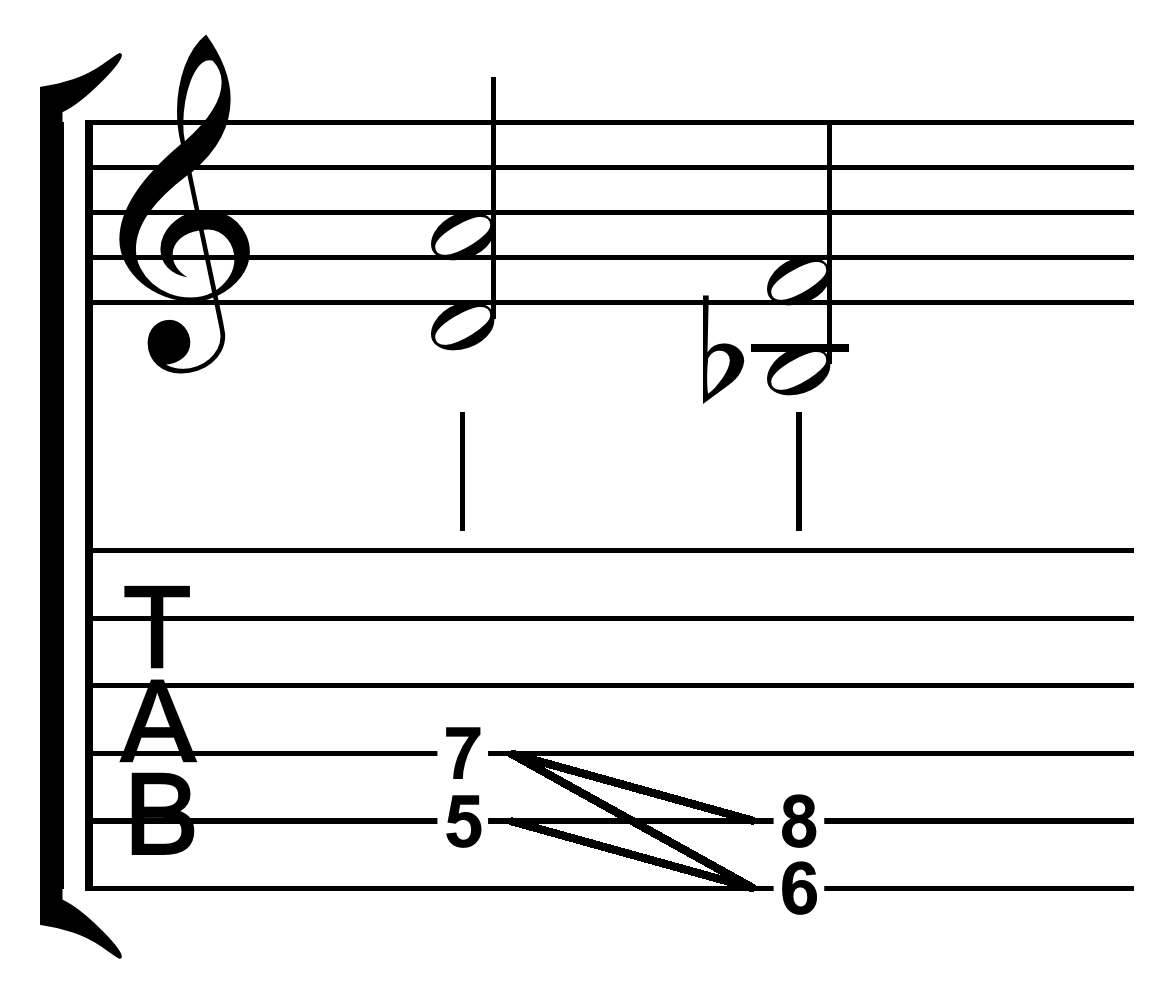
Spider chord on D and B♭. The "web" of lines in the tab between each successive fret shows the fingering order (5-6-7-8 fingered 1-2-3-4 on strings 5-6-4-5).

The spider chord is a guitar technique popularized during the 1980s thrash metal scene. Regarded as being popularized and named by Dave Mustaine of Megadeth, it is used to reduce string noise when playing (mostly chromatic) riffs that require chords across several strings. The chord or technique is used in the songs "Wake Up Dead", "Holy Wars... The Punishment Due", and "Ride the Lightning".

   D5 Bb5
e|-------|
B|-------|
G|-------|
D|-7-----|
A|-5--8--|
E|----6--|
   3      <
   1  4   <--Spider chord fingering
      2   <

As seen in the above tab, the two power chords may be played in succession without shifting, making it easier and quicker, and thus avoiding string noise. The normal fingering would be $_1^3$ for both chords, requiring a simultaneous shift and string change. Note that the two power chords are a major third apart: if the first chord is the tonic the second is the minor submediant. The spider chord fingering also allows access to a major seventh chord without the third:

    AM7
e|------|
B|------|
G|------|
D|--6---|
A|--7---|
E|--5---|
    3
    4
    2

The spider chord requires the player to use all four fingers of the fretting hand, thus its name. This technique then allows one to run down the neck playing either of the two chords.

== Fingering ==
Perhaps the most common implementation is 1-5-1', that is, the root note, a note a fifth above the root, and a note an octave above the root. When the strings are a fourth apart, especially the lower four strings in standard tuning, the lowest note is played with some fret on some string and the higher two notes are two frets higher on the next two strings. Using standard tuning, notes on the first or second string must be played one fret higher than this. (A bare fifth without octave doubling is the same, except that the highest of the three strings, in brackets below, is not played. A bare fifth with the bass note on the second string has the same fingering as one on the fifth or sixth string.)

        G5     A5     D5     E5     G5     A5     D5     A5
E||----------------------------------------------(10)---(5)----|
B||--------------------------------(8)----(10)----10-----5-----|
G||------------------(7)----(9)-----7------9------7------2-----|
D||----(5)----(7)-----7------9------5------7-------------------|
A||-----5------7------5------7---------------------------------|
E||-----3------5-----------------------------------------------|

An inverted barre fifth, i.e. a barre fourth, can be played with one finger, as in the example below, from the riff in "Smoke on the Water" by Deep Purple:

     G5/D Bb5/F C5/G   G5/D Bb5/F Db5/Ab C5/G
E||------------------------|----------------------|
B||------------------------|----------------------|
G||*-----3-—5--------------|-----3-—6---5---------|
D||*--5—-3--5--------------|---5—3--6—--5---------|
A||---5--------------------|---5------------------|
E||------------------------|----------------------|

|-----------------------|---------------------||
|-----------------------|---------------------||
|------3—-5--3—--0------|--------------------*||
|---5—-3--5-—3---0------|--------------------*||
|---5-------------------|---------------------||
|-----------------------|---------------------||

Another implementation used is 5-1'-5', that is, a note a fourth below the root, the root note, and a note a fifth above the root. (This is sometimes called a "fourth chord", but usually the second note is taken as the root, although it's not the lowest one.) When the strings are a fourth apart, the lower two notes are played with some fret on some two strings and the highest note is two frets higher on the next string. Of course, using standard tuning, notes on the first or second string must be played one fret higher.

        D5     E5     G5     A5     D5     A5     D5     G5
E||-----------------------------------------------5------10----|
B||---------------------------------10-----5------3------8-----|
G||-------------------7------9------7------2-----(2)----(7)----|
D||-----7------9------5------7-----(7)----(2)------------------|
A||-----5------7-----(5)----(7)--------------------------------|
E||----(5)----(7)----------------------------------------------|

With the drop D tuning—or any other dropped tuning for that matter—power chords with the bass on the sixth string can be played with one finger, and D power chords can be played on three open strings.

     D5      E5
E||----------------
B||----------------
G||----------------
D||--0-------2-----
A||--0-------2-----
D||--0-------2-----

Occasionally, open, "stacked" power chords with more than three notes are used in drop D.

E||--------------------------5---
B||--3-------5-------7-------3---
G||--2-------4-------6-------2---
D||--0-------2-------4-------0---
A||--0-------2-------4-------0---
D||--0-------2-------4-------0---

== See also ==
- Overtone
- Intermodulation
- Electronic tuner
