= Mussafia =

The surname Mussafia, Musafia, or Musaphia, or Mussaphia may refer to:

- Adolf Mussafia (1835–1905), Austrian philologist from Dalmatia
- Benjamin Musaphia (c. 1606 – 1675), Jewish doctor, scholar and kabbalist
- Ḥayyim Yitzḥak Mussafia (1760–1837), Talmudist
- Joseph Musaphia (born 1935), a New Zealand writer and actor
- Julien Musafia (1925–2015), American pianist and musicologist

== See also ==
- Mussaf
- Mussafah
