= String change =

On string instruments, a string change is a change from playing on one string to another. This may also involve a simultaneous change in fingering and/or position (shift), all of which must be done skillfully to avoid noticeable string noise. String may be indicated through Roman numerals (I-IV) or simply the string's base note's letter (e.g. A, E, G, etc.), fingering may be indicated through numbers for the fingers (1-4), and position may be indicated through ordinal numbers (e.g. 2nd). When two strings are played at the same time it is a double stop.

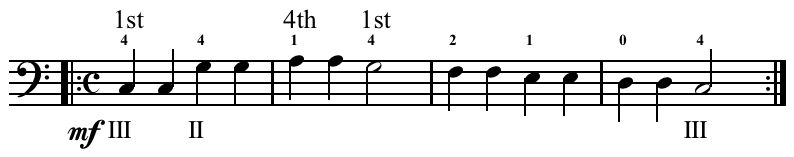
Possible string technique and notation demonstrated on a bit of "Twinkle, Twinkle, Little Star". Note the string change to A avoided through shifting and the string change to the G string.

== See also ==
- Stopped note
