= Stick bass =

Stick bass may refer to the following musical instruments:

- Stick bass, or Electric upright bass
- Stick Bass, a variant of the Chapman Stick
