= El Reno Renardo =

- Origin: Getxo, Basque Country, Spain
- Genres: Heavy metal Power metal Comedy rock Hard rock
- Years active: 2006–present
- Members: Jevo: Vocalist and Second Guitar; Ander the Thunder: Bass; Ivan: Drums; Mikel: Main Guitar
- Past members: Joss: Bass
- Website: Official Page

El Reno Renardo is a humoristic heavy metal-band from Spain. The main theme of the lyrics of "El Reno Renardo" are daily situations narrated in a humorous way, being some songs principal objective the social critique.

Many of their songs are parodies or demos of well known songs of pop, rock or metal, whereas others are totally original (both the lyrics and the instrumental part).

== History ==
This started as an online project in solitary by Jevo (Soulitude, ex-Valhalla) in 2006. After having tried and failed a similar project of humoristic heavy metal named Metalcrilator with members of Valhalla, Jevo decided to do it by his own under the name El Reno Renardo.

He recorded the first free online LP in which he played guitars, bass, vocals and programmed the keyboards and the drums, being still a one-man project. Jevo invented a story, a formation and a location, which made people think that it was a real band.

He decided to record a second album entitled El Reno Renardo y el Reino De La Cagalera De Bisbal. It exceeded expectations.

El Reno Renardo was first created with the intention of being a studio project, but after being quite successful on the Internet, Jevo decided to recruit a line-up with old members of Valhalla for a first show.

Since then, El Reno Renardo have been a band.

== Discography ==
This band has published the following albums.

=== El Reno Renardo (2007) ===
- 01. Cipote Ancho
- 02. No quiero ir al Gym
- 03. El Reno Renardo
- 04. Imbécil
- 05. Camino Moria
- 06. Yonkis Sobre Ruedas
- 07. Espera Farru Que Me Quito
- 08. Doctor Luis
- 09. Ni Una Sola Parada
- 10. Imagina
- 11. Mierda
- 12. Toroturadores
- 13. Zapping (Part I)

=== El Reno Renardo y El Reino de la Cagalera de Bisbal (2008) ===
- 01. Renux Renardi
- 02. Cambio Radical
- 03. Hasta La Polla
- 04. Ctrl+Alt+Supr
- 05. El Bogavante
- 06. Carrockñeros del Rock
- 07. El Bardo Bastardo (In the Forest)
- 08. Crecí en los Ochenta
- 09. Zapping (Part II)
- 10. Cien Idiotas
- 11. Tu hamster
- 12. Fiesta Palangana
- 13. Vomito
- 14. Amamos la Birra
- 15. Trilorgía. Día 1: Despiporre
- 16. Trilorgía. Día 2: Secuelas
- 17. Trilorgía. Día 3: Urgencias
- 18. Outro: El Punky Perroflauta que tocaba la Canción del Equipo A y fue Ejecutado por Luke Skywalker

=== El Improperio Contraataca (2010) ===
- 01. Intro Darth Gayer
- 02. Subnorman
- 03. Mi Casa
- 04. Mis Colegas
- 05. Señoras
- 06. Todos Contra el Canon
- 07. Entre Dos Piernas
- 08. En el Nardo
- 09. Opus Deiman
- 10. Con las manos en la Grasa
- 11. El Abuelo Batallitas y el Nieto Repelente
- 12. La Navaja del Trueno Inmortal
- 13. Enterradme en Media Markt
- 14. De Bilbao
- 15. Restos de Joaquín
- 16. Subnormercado
- 17. Subnormix

=== Babuinos del Metal (2013) ===
- 01. Típica Intro
- 02. Game Over
- 03. No Hay Huevos
- 04. Majestad
- 05. Dios Del Balompié
- 06. Americano
- 07. Violenta Revolución
- 08. Festival
- 09. Leia
- 10. Fibergran
- 11. Orcos De Mordor
- 12. Hipihopo
- 13. Preludio al dolor
- 14. Qué Dolor
- 15. Te Das Queen
- 16. Mongomix

=== Meriendacena Con Satán (2016) ===
- 01. Que empiece ya
- 02. Del centro comercial a la casa rural
- 03. Meriendacena medieval
- 04. Vinagre
- 05. El as de oros
- 06. Ampluger
- 07. Facebook
- 08. Puñoterapia
- 09. Telepasión
- 10. Busque y compare
- 11. Cagar anzuelos
- 12. Mi número, Juan Luis
- 13. Todo seta
- 14. Retromix
- 15. Euskal txupifesta
- 16. Tutti frutti summer love

=== Hostiopatia (2018) ===
- 01. Intruder
- 02. Compañero de Piso
- 03. La Gente es Imbécil
- 04. Sanotes
- 05. Conspiranoid
- 06. Eres Trve
- 07. Qué Has Tomao
- 08. Cinta Americana
- 09. Cafelitos
- 10. Cumpleaños Feliz
- 11. Forfait
- 12. Huele mi Ombligo
- 13. Ofender
- 14. El Megalodón
- 15. Idiomix

=== Rarezas Raras (2020) ===
- 01. Intrillo
- 02. Crecí En Los 90
- 03. Hasta La Polla 2020
- 04. Retrakermix
- 05. El Bardo Bastardo (Power Edition)
- 06. Facebook (Mongodance Edition)
- 07. La Navaja Del Trueno Immortal (Orquestal)
- 08. Orcos De Mordor (Ampluger)
- 09. Meriendacena Medieval (Ampluger)
- 10. No Quiero Ir Al Gym (Live Barcelona)
- 11. Tu Hamster (Live Bilbao)
- 12. Camino Moria (Live Itxura Studios)
- 13. Mis Colegas (Remix)
- 14. Señoras (Remix)
- 15. Festival (Remix)
- 16. Cuñaos
- 17. Hellrule Main Theme

=== El Mundo Se Va A La Mierda (2021) ===
- 1. Intro: El Reno, El Feo y El Malo
- 2. El Mundo Se Va A La mierda
- 3. Lo Puto Peor
- 4. Spoilerman
- 5. Puretas Del Caribe
- 6. C.L.H.P.D
- 7. Ojo Cuidao
- 8. Nos Comen Los Monguers
- 9. Sueco
- 10. La Solitaria
- 11. Mamarrachos
- 12. Esto No Es Disney
- 13. Malote
- 14. Madre
- 15. Bobomix

=== Regreso Al Metalverso (2024) ===
- 1. Intro: Pienso luego sexito
- 2. Tonto del bulo
- 3. I.A: En un planeta subnormal
- 4. Esfinternet
- 5. Come sano
- 6. Gente mayor del metal (VejeStory Part I)
- 7. Antoñito
- 8. Cada vez
- 9. Pesao, y los sabes
- 10. Mantita y sofá (VejeStory Part II)
- 11. Miniserie - 1x01 - Camión vs camión
- 12. Miniserie - 1x02 - Punky y hardcoreta 01:23
- 13. Miniserie - 1x03 - No pienses en pesetas
- 14. Vikingo de Aliexpress
- 15. Baila como un viejo (VejeStory Part III)
- 16. Gilimix
