= Musical technique =

Ability of musicians to exert optimal control of their instruments and/or bodies

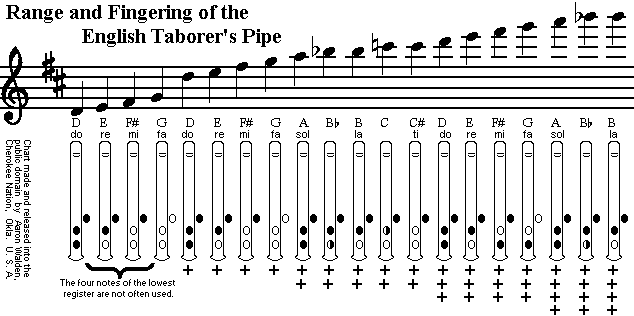
Fingering chart for the tabor pipe

Musical technique is the ability of instrumental and vocal musicians to exert optimal control of their instruments or vocal cords in order to produce the precise musical effects they desire. Improving one's technique generally entails practicing exercises that improve one's muscular sensitivity and agility. Technique is independent of musicality—‌sensitivity to, knowledge of, or aptitude for (i.e., having an "ear" for) music. Compositional technique is the ability and knowledge composers use to create music, and may be distinguished from instrumental or performance technique, which in classical music is used to realize compositions, but may also be used in musical improvisation. Extended techniques are distinguished from more simple and more common techniques. Musical technique may also be distinguished from music theory, in that performance is a practical matter, but study of music theory is often used to understand better and to improve techniques. Techniques such as intonation or timbre, articulation, and musical phrasing are nearly universal to all instruments.

To improve their technique, musicians often practice ear training. For example, musical intervals, and fundamental patterns and of notes such as the natural, minor, major, and chromatic scales, minor and major triads, dominant and diminished sevenths, formula patterns and arpeggios. For example, triads and sevenths teach how to play chords with accuracy and speed. Scales teach how to move quickly and gracefully from one note to another (usually by step). Arpeggios teach how to play broken chords over larger intervals. Many of these components of music are found in difficult compositions, for example, a large tuple chromatic scale is a very common element to Classical and Romantic era compositions as part of the end of a phrase.

Articulations from legato to staccatissimo. Legato, Portato, Staccato, Staccatissimo

Tuning is a musical technique which is performed directly before nearly all instruments are used (even unpitched percussion instruments are often tuned), so it is often taught to students at the beginning of study of most instrumentals. Different instruments require varying techniques. For example, string instruments require fingering technique, while bowed string instruments require bow technique. Brass and woodwind instruments require mouthing techniques (correct positioning and shaping of the mouth and proper breathing), while woodwind instruments often require fingering technique, brass instruments often have simpler fingering than woodwinds but require a basic understanding of the harmonic series. Musical technique is often related to physical memory, such as correct position and stopping on a string instrument, positioning of the trombone slide, memorizing guitar chords' and piano chords' fingering, and the proper position and shape of one's mouth for brass and woodwind instruments.

Heinrich Schenker argued that musical technique's "most striking and distinctive characteristic" is repetition.

Works known as études (meaning "study") are also frequently used for the improvement of technique.

== Observations ==
In an interview at the Kronberg academy Mstislav Rostropovich was asked the following question directly about whether musicality and musical technique are separate issues to be worked separately "Do you think that in teaching repertoire and technical issues, they should be separate things, or did you always combine both things working musically and technically at the same time?" Rostropovich responded with the following (partial quote, see video link below for full answer to question):

"...if you know which kind of sound you must produce for this composition, your muscles automatically play what is needed for that. Because your brain dictates to your muscles much better than your teacher dictates to you. Sometimes of course I must make something technically more precise, but most important [is] your idea, how you must play in your brain."

Alexander Markov is quoted as saying:

"See I always felt about the music and the technical aspect of it, to me it's very much together, because I know some musicians, some violinists they isolate the technical aspect from playing violin and the music itself, but to me they work hand in hand so much. So for example, the more I get involved musically the more technically I am accurate."

Pamela Frank is quoted as saying:

"Practicing technique separate from music, I really don't believe in--the way you play is the way you have practiced. If you have practiced mechanically, you will play mechanically. If you treat a scale like a great melody, when it shows up in the Beethoven concerto it will be a great melody."

== See also ==
- Guitar technique
- Thumb position
- Bowed string instrument extended technique
- Embouchure (wind instruments)
- Growling (wind instruments)
- Multiphonic
