= Thumb position =

Technique in music

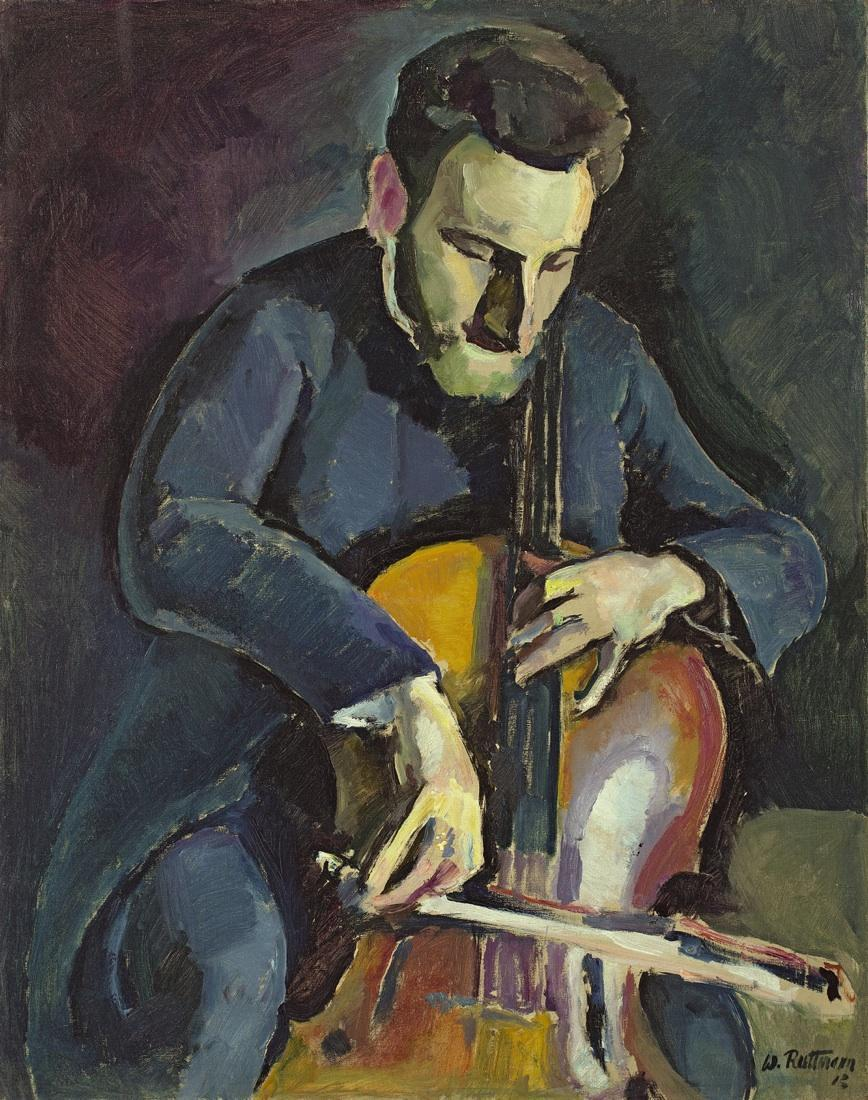
A painting of cellist using thumb position.

In music performance and education, thumb position, not a traditional position, is a string instrument playing technique used to facilitate playing in the upper register of the double bass, cello, and related instruments, such as the electric upright bass. To play passages in this register, the player shifts their hand out from behind the neck and curves the hand, using the side of the thumb to press down the string; in effect, the side of the thumb becomes a movable nut (capo).

== On the double bass ==
For the double bass, thumb position is used when playing above one-lined G (on the third ledger line in bass clef notation for the double bass). To play passages in this register, the player shifts their hand out from behind the neck and flattens it out, using the side of the thumb to press down the string. When playing in thumb position, the use of the fourth finger is replaced by the third finger, as the fourth finger becomes too short to produce a reliable tone. Bass instruction books often teach thumb position by having the player place the left-hand thumb on the high (one-lined) G note.

In this same position, notes below the G can also be played. By barring the thumb across the G and D strings, the G and D notes can be played in quick succession. Alternatively, notes on the D string can be performed in quick alternation with notes on the G string. While traditional methods rarely discuss playing on the A or E string in thumb position, French pedagogue Francois Rabbath (and his disciples such as Paul Ellison) advocate the performance of notes on the A and E strings. While introductory manuals start teaching thumb position by stopping the G string on the high G, any of the notes on the upper part of the fingerboard can be stopped and held by the thumb.

One issue with the use of thumb position is that it is harder to produce vibrato with the thumb than with the fingers, because fingers have much fleshier pads than the side of the thumb. While the difference between the vibrato sound produced by the fingers and the thumb may not be noticeable in a passage of moving notes, if there is a held note which is stopped by the thumb, which is vibrated, the difference may be noticeable. As such, some players use finger substitution to replace the thumb with one of the fingers.

=== Other bass instruments ===
Electric bassists such as Brian Bromberg and Steve Bailey have applied the thumb position technique to their instruments because they share a common tuning. In the jazz world, many bassists from the 1970s onward play both instruments, sometimes with equal proficiency (e.g. Stanley Clarke). The advantage of using thumb position on the bass guitar is that the left hand can cover two octaves or more without shifting position, which facilitates complex passages.

== On the cello ==
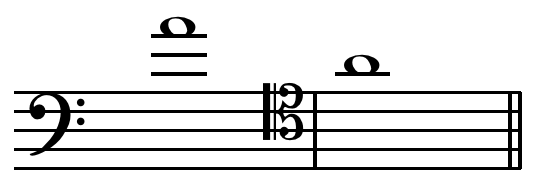
The cello thumb position is introduced on the second or half-string harmonic, the note "A" on the highest string.

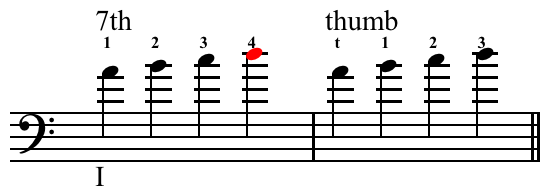
The note D is difficult if not impossible to reach with the fourth finger in 7th position without removing one's thumb from the neck, while it is easily reachable with the third finger in thumb position.

With the cello, in the "neck" positions (which use just less than half of the fingerboard, nearest the top of the instrument), the thumb rests on the back of the neck. However, in thumb position, the thumb usually rests alongside the fingers on the string and the side of the thumb is used to play notes, along with the other left-hand fingers. The fingers are normally held curved with each knuckle bent, with the fingertips in contact with the string. If a finger is required on two (or more) strings at once to play perfect fifths (in double stops or chords) it is used flat. In slower, or more expressive playing, the contact point can move slightly away from the nail to the pad of the finger, allowing a fuller vibrato.

Thumb position can be, and is (by virtue of the requirements of the extensive repertoire) employed many times, and not only in the higher range of the instrument. [emphasis added]

— Potter,

The cello thumb position is introduced on the second or half-string harmonic, because of the ease with which this note may be found, the succession of notes from seventh to thumb position being in "a natural sequence and range," and the stretch required to reach seventh position without removing the thumb from the neck. Bylsma attributes the tendency of many composers of the 19th century to prescribe thumb position only on the A string to the fact that they were not string players (in contrast to Boccherini, for example, who routinely used A and D, and also used G).

In thumb position, the "'standard' finger pattern," between the thumb, first and second fingers, is whole, whole, and half tone. Thus if the thumb is placed on A, the index and middle fingers are placed on B and C#.

As with the double bass, one issue with the use of thumb position is that it is harder to produce vibrato with the thumb than with the fingers, because fingers have much fleshier pads than the side of the thumb. Some cellists use finger substitution to replace the thumb with one of the fingers or alternatively press down on the thumb using the index finger to provide an ample range of vibration.

== See also ==
- Electric upright bass
- Fingering
- List of jazz bassists
- List of classical bassists
