= D'Alegria =

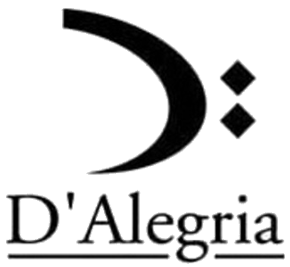
- Industry: Musical instruments
- Founded: 2003; 22 years ago
- Founder: Daniel Alegria and Rodrigo Werneck
- Headquarters: Brazil
- Area served: Worldwide
- Products: Electric guitars and basses

D'Alegria is a Brazilian company specialized in manufacturing custom-made electric guitars and basses. The company was established in 2003 in Rio de Janeiro by partners Daniel Alegria and Rodrigo Werneck, and distributes its products worldwide.

== Models ==
=== Basic models ===
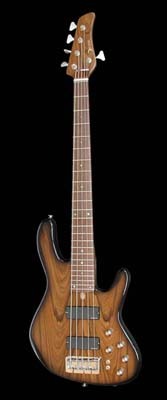
5-string D'Alegria Defender JB Deluxe bass

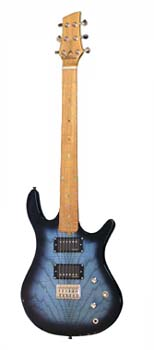
6-string D'Alegria Dimension guitar

- Dart - 4, 5 or 6-string bass, presenting the Dart, A-Dart ("Acoustic Dart") and Double Dart versions
- Defender - 4 or 5-string bass, presenting the JB and JB Deluxe versions
- Dragster - 4 or 5-string bass
- Discovery - 4-string electric upright bass (EUB), with piezo pickups
- Dimension - 6-string electric guitar
- Dragon - 4, 5, 6 or 7-string bass

=== Signature models ===
- Defender TB - 4-string fretted bass, Trevor Bolder's signature model
- Defender TP - 5-string fretted bass, Trae Pierce's signature model
- Dimension JD - 6-string guitar, Jan Dumée's signature model
- Defender JP - 5-string fretted bass, Jorge Pescara's signature model
- Dart FA - 6-string fretted bass, Felipe Andreoli's signature model
- A-Dart FA - 6-string fretless bass, Felipe Andreoli's signature model
- Dart AN - 6-string fretted bass, André Neiva's signature model
- Dynamo AG - 4-string fretted bass (short fingerboard, 32 inches), André Gomes's signature model

== Artists ==
Some musicians who play/have played D'Alegria instruments are:

- Trevor Bolder (Uriah Heep, Wishbone Ash and David Bowie)
- Trae Pierce (Blind Boys of Alabama, and James Brown's and Dr. Hook's bands)
- Jan Dumée (On The Rocks, Focus)
- Jorge Pescara (Ithamara Koorax, Dom Um Romão, Eumir Deodato, Luiz Bonfá, ZERO, Fernando Girão, solo)
- Felipe Andreoli (Angra and Karma)
- Arthur Maia (Gilberto Gil's band)
- Ako Kiiski (Wishbone Ash)
- Dennis Ward (Pink Cream 69)
- Dudu Lima (Stanley Jordan's band)
- André Gomes (Pepeu Gomes's band, and Cheiro de Vida)

== See also ==
- Jorge Pescara
