= Finger substitution =

Musical performance technique

Finger substitution is a playing technique used on many different instruments, ranging from stringed instruments such as the violin and cello to keyboard instruments such as the piano and pipe organ. It involves replacing one finger which is depressing a string or key with another finger to facilitate the performance of a passage or create a desired tone or sound. The simplest type of finger substitution is when a finger replaces another finger during a rest; the more difficult type is to replace one finger with another while a note is being played.

== On stringed instruments ==
On stringed instruments such as the violin, cello, and double bass, finger substitution is used for a variety of reasons. For complex, rapid passages, finger substitution is sometimes used to make a fingering pattern more consistent and easy to remember. In slow-moving music with expressive sustained bowed notes, finger substitution may be used so that a particular finger can be used for vibrato, to add emphasis to a note, or to introduce a subtle glissando effect (especially in Tango music and certain Romantic styles). One of the difficulties with finger substitution is maintaining correct intonation; when a finger replaces another finger to perform the same pitch, there is the risk that the intonation of the replaced finger may not match that of the initial note.

When a string player does finger substitution, they usually take care to hide the switching of the fingers by doing the replacement during a bow change or a rest. Finger substitution is more difficult with bowed (arco) passages than with pizzicato passages, because the notes are sustained much longer with the bow; if the substitution is not done carefully, an arco passage is more likely to result in unwanted shifting noises. In some cases, as with Romantic era music, Roma music, or Tango pieces, players may deliberately leave in the short glissando that occurs with finger substitution, using this as an expressive effect or ornament. When cello or double bass players are playing a high-register passage in thumb position, the thumb may be replaced with a finger if there is a sustained note which would otherwise have to be played with the thumb, because the vibrato with the thumb sounds different from finger vibrato. The bony side of the thumb cannot produce the same type of vibrato as the fleshy pads of a fingertip.

== On keyboard instruments ==
On keyboard instruments such as the piano and pipe organ, finger substitution is the changing of the fingers on a key without releasing that key, so as to prepare the fingers for notes or chords which will follow.

=== Piano ===
As with stringed instruments, finger substitution is used for a variety of reasons in piano passages. The technique is often used to create a connected, flowing legato phrasing, or smooth out a sequence of consecutive thirds. For complex passages, finger substitution is sometimes used to make a fingering pattern more consistent and easy to remember. To change fingers on a key, the shorter finger is usually moved under the longer one in a quick motion. While finger substitution is a standard part of both piano and pipe organ pedagogy, performance practice experts argue that it was rarely done before the 18th century; instead, players simply relocated the hand or fingers to a new position. During the 19th century, the pipe organ practice of finger substitution was transferred to the piano; pianist-composers such as Beethoven and Chopin used finger substitution to make their melodies "sing" in a more sustained fashion.

With the modern piano, a player can avoid having to learn finger substitution on a sounding note by using the sustain pedal to prolong the note while the hand lifts and prepares for a new chord or melody note. While the sustain pedal can replace finger substitution and create a legato sound, piano teachers tend to frown on this use of the sustain pedal because it prevents the player from using the sustain pedal to control the tone and dynamics of the instrument.

=== Pipe organ ===
Pipe organist Sandra Soderlund notes that because there is "no way to sustain the sound when the finger or foot leaves the key, music that is to be legato has to be carefully fingered and pedaled". Organists use "finger substitution, finger and toe slides, and other tricks to accomplish this". On the pipe organ, performers use a related technique with their feet when playing the pedal keyboard; for some passages, performers may replace one foot with another foot. As with finger substitution, the most difficult type of foot substitution is in cases where one foot replaces another foot which is holding a sustained note. During the replacement, there is a risk of sounding unwanted notes or releasing the held note. Foot substitution can be done without planning for slow-moving, simple pedal parts. However, rapid or complex "pedal parts must be "choreographed" by the organist" and "carefully planned if they are to be successful".

== See also ==
- Fingering (music)
