= Bar chord =

Guitar performance technique

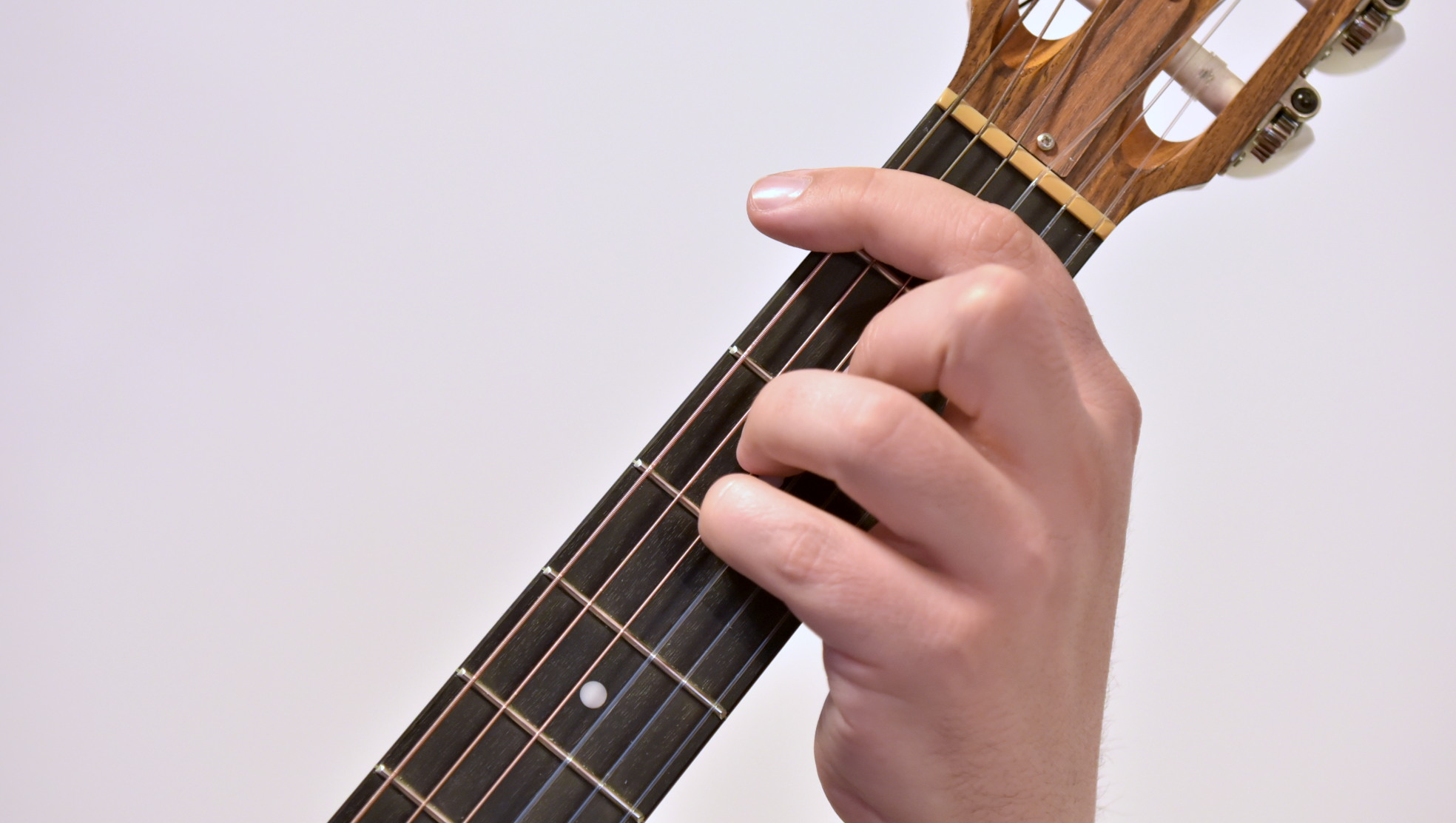
A bar chord ("A♯ minor"), with the index finger used to bar the strings.

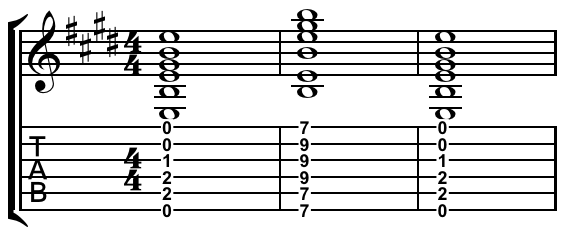
A, E major bar chord, then open E major chord.

In music, a bar chord (also spelled barre chord) is a type of chord on a guitar or other stringed instrument played by using one finger to press down multiple strings across a single fret of the fingerboard (like a bar pressing down the strings).

Players often use this chording technique to play a chord that is not restricted by the tones of the guitar's open strings. For instance, if a guitar is tuned to regular concert pitch, with the open strings being E, A, D, G, B, E (from low to high), open chords must be based on one or more of these notes. To play an F♯ chord the guitarist may barre strings so that the chord root is F♯.

Most bar chords are "moveable" chords, as the player can move the whole chord shape up and down the neck. Commonly used in both popular and classical music, bar chords are frequently used in combination with "open" chords, where the guitar's open (unfretted) strings construct the chord. Playing a chord with the bar technique slightly affects tone quality. A closed, or fretted, note sounds slightly different from an open, unfretted, string. Bar chords are a distinctive part of the sound of pop music and rock music.

Using the bar technique, the guitarist can fret a familiar open chord shape, and then transpose, or raise, the chord a number of half-steps higher, similar to the use of a capo. For example, when the current chord is an E major and the next is an F♯ major, the guitarist bars the open E major up two frets (two semitones) from the open position to produce the barred F♯ major chord. Such chords are hard to play for beginners due to the pressing of multiple strings with a single finger. Mastering the bar chord technique can be one of the most difficult challenges that a beginner guitarist faces.

== Technique and application ==
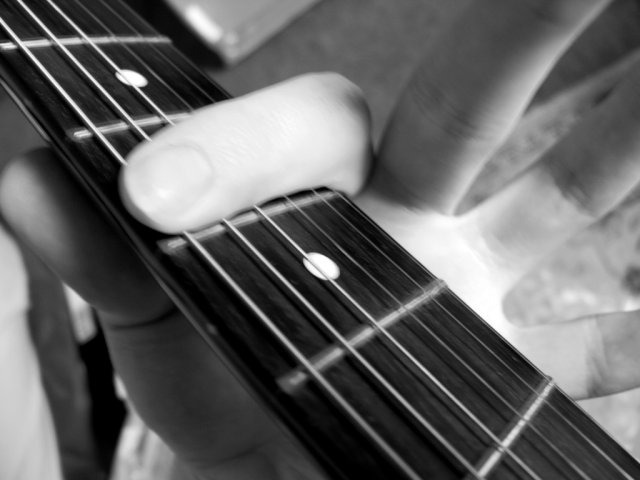
The index finger locates the root note in the chord shape.

- Note: notes of each chord are listed from bottom, thickest string (lowest in pitch) string to top (a standard six-string tuning of EADGBE, from lowest to highest-pitched string).

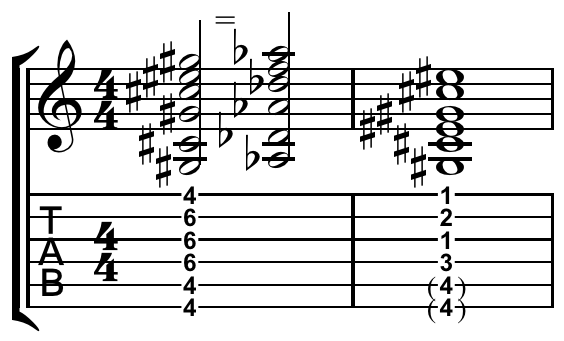
D♭/C♯ barre chord (left), difficult to reach in open position (right).

Beginners often have difficulties learning the Barre technique, since it requires fine motor skills in the left hand fingers. Guitarists typically use bar chords to voice chords in higher positions. Keys that don't have many open notes in standard tuning (hence few or no open chord fingerings) require many bar chords. The two most commonly barred notes are variations on the fingering shapes of A and E in first (open) position. The E-type bar chord is an E chord shape (022100) barred up and down the frets, transposing the chord. For example, the E chord barred one fret up becomes an F chord (133211). The next fret up is F♯, followed by G, A♭, A, B♭, B, C, C♯, D, E♭, and then back to E (1 octave up) at fret twelve.

              E               A
E-------------0---------------5---
B-------------0---------------5---
G-------------1---------------6---
D-------------2---------------7---
A-------------2---------------7---
E-------------0---------------5---
Guitar tablature of an open E chord and an E-shape A bar chord.

The "A" type bar chord, occasionally called the double bar, is the A chord shape (X02220) moved up and down the frets. To bar the A chord shape, the guitarist puts the index finger across the top five strings, usually touching the 6th string (E) to mute it. They then bar either the ring or little finger across the 2nd (B), 3rd (G), and 4th (D) strings two frets down, or one finger frets each string. For instance, barred at the second fret, the A chord becomes B (X24442). From fret one to twelve, the barred A becomes B♭, B, C, C♯, D, E♭, E, F, F♯, G, A♭, and at the twelfth fret (that is, one octave up), it is A again.

              A               D
E-------------0---------------5---
B-------------2---------------7---
G-------------2---------------7---
D-------------2---------------7---
A-------------0---------------5---
E---------------------------------
Guitar tablature of an open A chord and an A-shape D bar chord.

Sometimes the guitarist leaves out the highest note in a double bar chord. Most variations of these two chords can be barred: dominant 7ths, minors, minor 7ths, etc.

Minor bar chords include a minor third in the chord rather than the major third (in "E" and "A" shaped bar chords, this note happens to be the highest 'non-barred' note). Example:

         F        Fm       C       Cm
E--------1--------1--------3-------3-------
B--------1--------1--------5-------4-------
G--------2--------1--------5-------5-------
D--------3--------3--------5-------5-------
A--------3--------3--------3-------3-------
E--------1--------1------------------------

In addition to the two common shapes above, bar/movable chords can also be built on any chord fingering, provided that the shape leaves the first finger free to create the barre, and that the chord does not require the fingers to extend beyond a four fret range. Examples:

         D        A
E--------2--------5-----
B--------3--------2-----
G--------2--------2-----
D--------4--------2-----
A--------5--------4-----
E-----------------5-----

The above shows D major in open "C" shape form and A major in open "G" shape form. In the example above, the "C" shape offers an alternative voicing to the open D major and to the "A" shaped D major in fifth position. Variations of the basic major and minor triad chords can also be formed using the barred chord as their foundation. For example, the open Cadd9 shape can be used in its C shape bar form up the guitar neck, as desired.

=== CAGED System ===
The CAGED system is an acronym for the chords C, A, G, E, and D. This acronym is shorthand for the use of bar chords that can be played anywhere on the fret board as described above. Some guitar instructors use it to teach students the open chords that can work as bar chords across the fret board. By replacing the nut with a full bar, a player can use the chord shapes for C, A, G, E, and D anywhere on the fret board to play any major chord in any key.

CAGED is also a mnemonic for the sequence that a chord appears in as it moves up the neck; for example, C Major can be played as an open C-shape chord at the nut, as an A-shape chord barred at the third fret, as a G-shape barred at the fifth fret, as an E-shape barred at the eighth fret, and as a D-shape barred at the 10th fret. Similarly, G Major can be played as an open G-shaped chord and the next shape in which the chord appears is as an E-shape (barred at the third fret), followed by the D-shape (barred at the 5th fret); the CAGED pattern then begins again with a C-shape barred at the 7th fret, an A-shape at the 10th fret, and so on.

The same cycle can be applied to all other chord types. Learning the five movable C-, A-, G-, E-, and D-shapes of a dominant 7th chord, for instance, effectively allows the player to learn 60 chords, since each of the five shapes can be positioned so that any of the 12 chromatic notes is the root note.

This system also provides a way to remember scale shapes, though some debate the usefulness of this teaching method due to potential technical problems.

=== Use in popular music ===
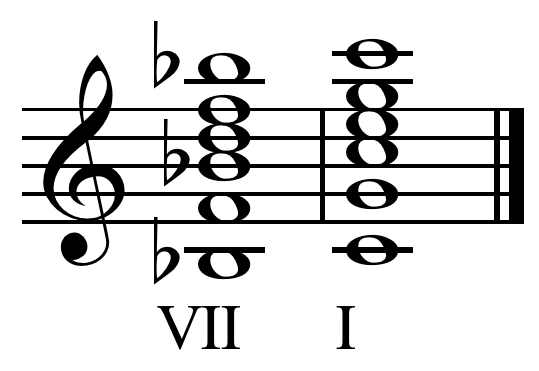
VII-I cadence in C major.

The use of the leading-tone imperfect authentic cadence (VII-I) in popular music is often attributed to the ease of sliding a bar chord up two frets. In the context of classical music, Fernando Sor recommended using barring and shifting sparingly. His principal reason for avoiding bar chords is that they require more effort—but he acknowledges that they are frequently the best or only solution for playing some passages.

== Partial bar chords ==
              F               F
E-------------1---------------1---
B-------------1---------------1---
G-------------2---------------2---
D-------------3---------------3---
A-------------3-------------------
E-------------1-------------------
An F-shape "great bar" chord and an F-shape "small bar" chord.

Guitarists distinguish between the "great bar"/"grand bar" or full bar chord and incomplete or "small bar" chords such as the half bar. The small bar or regular F chord is easily obtainable, but "Being able to play the Small Bar chord formations does little towards developing the technique required to play the Great Bar chord formations."

       Gm     Gm     Gm     Gm7
E------3------3------3------3------
B------3------3------3------3------
G------3------3------3------3------
D------5------5-------------3------
A------5---------------------------
E------3---------------------------
E-shape Gm 'great', 'small',[11] "simplified version",[1]
and Em7-shape Gm7 'small'[8] chords.

The 'simplified version' on the upper three strings is "useful in playing solos," and may be played with any of the first three fingers. The minor seventh chord whose root is located on the first may instead be considered an added sixth chord whose root is located on the third string, in which case one may consider the Gm7 a B♭add6.

== Diagonal bar chord ==
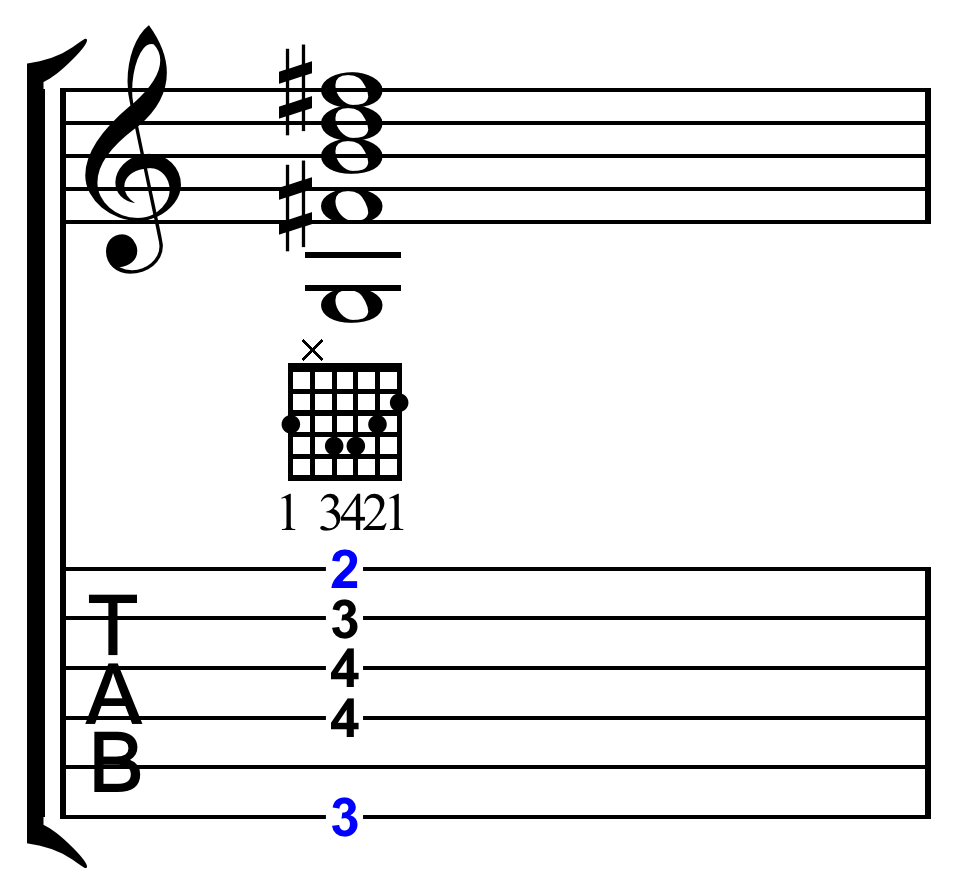
Diagonal bar chord: major seventh chord on G. The first finger frets both the second fret on the first string and the third fret on the sixth string.

A diagonal bar chord is a "very rare chord" involving "the barring of a couple of strings with the first finger [diagonally] on different frets."

== Notation ==
Standard music notation indicates the barre technique with one of two letters, "B" or "C"—followed by a positional indication via an Arabic number or Roman numeral. Examples: BIII, CVII, B2, C7.

The two abbreviations "B", "C", represent the terms bar or barre, cejillo or capotasto, the later being Spanish and Italian terms for capo. The choice of letter is an editorial decision that reflects the style adopted. Roman numerals are more prevalent than Arabic numbers to avoid confusion with other fingering indications and common chord symbols (but not figured harmony). Roman numerals without the "B" or "C" indicates fingerboard position only.

Editorial style also affects partial bar indications. A vertical strike-through of the letter "C" commonly indicates a partial bar—the number of strings to bar depends on context and performer choice. Other editorial styles use superscript fractions (e.g., 4/6, 1/2) indicates the number of strings to bar in addition to the letters B or C. In some notation styles (particularly classical staff notation), the letters "B" or "C" are omitted altogether, with the number of courses to bar (from the highest-tuned downwards) written as an index (superscript). For example: on a guitar, VII^{4} indicates a bar on the 7th fret over the highest four strings (D, G, B, and E). There is no rule for whether to write full bar chords with indices (e.g., "6" for a standard guitar) or without. It is a matter of the editor's personal taste. It is customary to place the bar sign above the staff, with a spanning line to mark duration.

The bar is often signed on tablature as "C" with the fret number as Roman numeral, such as

         CVII     CVIII    CXII     CII
E--------7--------8--------13-------2-------
B--------9--------8--------15-------4-------
G--------9--------8--------14-------2-------
D--------9--------10-------12-------4-------
A--------7--------10-------12-------2-------
E--------7--------8--------12-------2-------
         E        Cm       Dm       B7

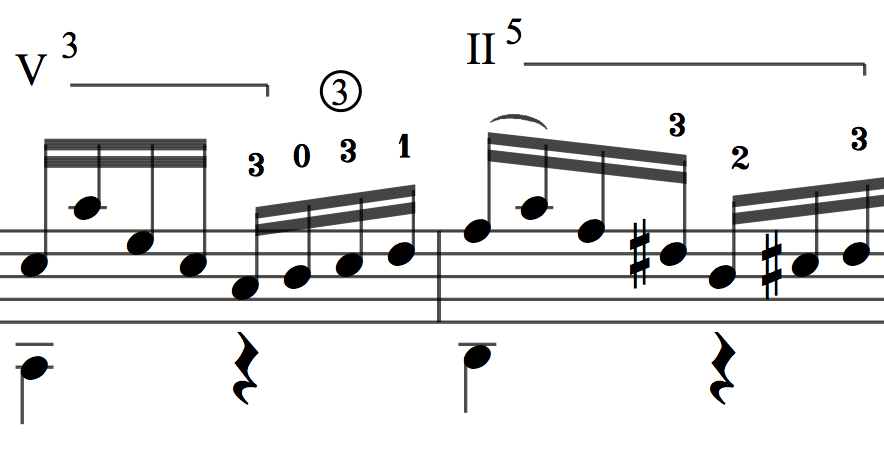
Barre chord notation in classical music uses Roman numerals with indices (see left).

== See also ==
- Slide guitar
- Thumb position
