= Ḥayyim Yitzḥak Mussafia =

18th- and 19th-century Talmudist

Personal life
- Born: 1760 Jerusalem, Ottoman Empire
- Died: 10 June 1837 (aged 76–77) Spalato, Dalmatia, Austrian Empire

Religious life
- Religion: Judaism

Ḥayyim Yitzḥak Mussafia (Hebrew: חיים יצחק בן אברהם מוסאפיא; 1760, in Jerusalem – 10 June 1837, in Spalato) was an 18th- and 19th-century Talmudist.

He studied chiefly under David Pardo of Sarajevo, the author of numerous Talmudic works. In 1796, at the age of seventeen, he became rabbi and av bet din of the congregation at Spalato, which position he held for sixty years, until his death.

Mussafia wrote: Ḥayyim va-ḥesed (published after his death by his children, Livorno, 1840), discussions on Jacob ben Asher's Arba'ah Turim; Ḥiddushe dinim (Livorno, 1844), halakic discussions; Derekh ha-ḥayyim ve-tokhaḥat musar, sermons and ethical precepts; and annotations to the commentaries of Rashi and to David Altschul's Metzudat Tziyyon on the Pentateuch.

His son Jacob, who succeeded him as rabbi of Spalato and edited the responsa of the Geonim (Lyck, 1864), died before 1864.
