= String noise =

In guitar and string instrument technique, string noise is the noise created by the movement of the fingers of one hand (usually the left hand) against the strings, such as when shifting on one string, or changing from one string to another.

String noise is often an unwanted side-effect that musicians try to avoid or minimize, especially when playing with amplification or distortion (as on an electric guitar). However, string noise can be intentionally used or emphasized as a stylistic choice.

String noise is generally relatively quiet but parallel string motion brings out higher, more dissonant harmonics than perpendicular string motion. However this should not be confused with parallel rather than perpendicular bowing, which is relatively quite loud and harsh.

If the pressure was consistent then the result would be a glissando. However, if the pressure is eliminated, then string noise does not result but the movement is more difficult. On fretted string instruments, the frets guide the movement of the hand, making the movement easier, but the frets increase the amount of contact, making fret noise more difficult to avoid.
