= Electric upright bass =

Electric version of a double bass

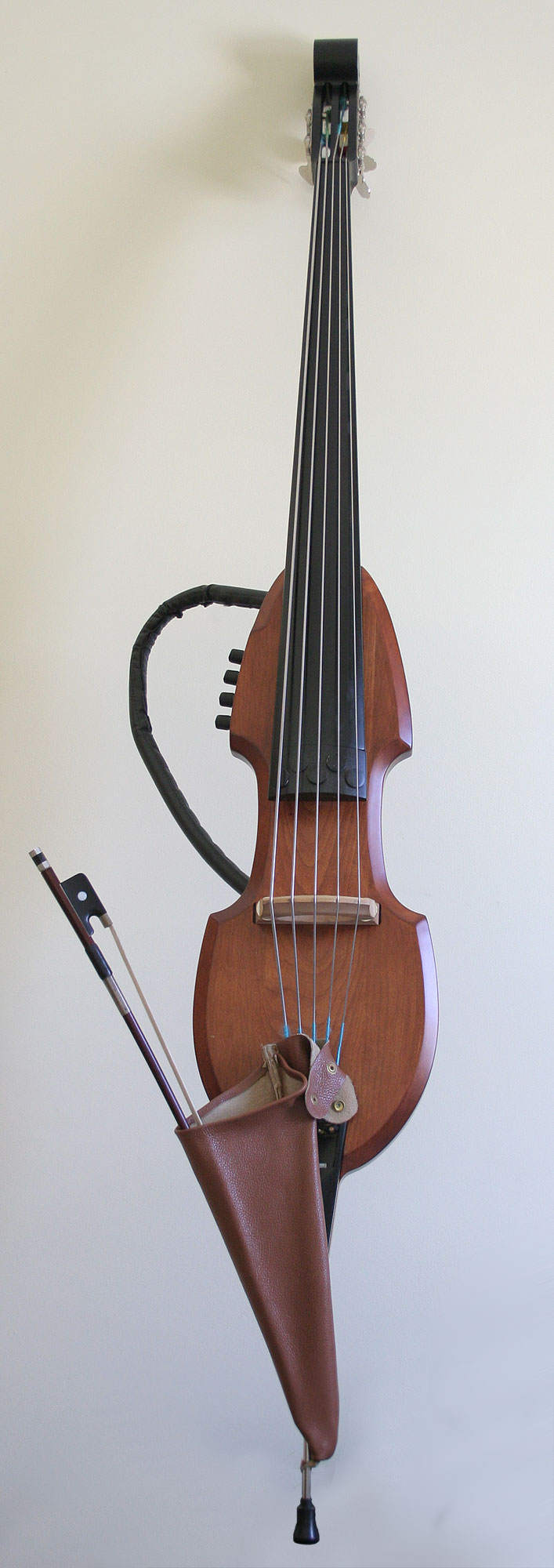
- An Aria SWB 02/5 5-string EUB with a skeleton-style upper bout so that the bass will sit against the body properly.

String instrument
- Other names: Stick bass
- Classification: String instrument (bowed or plucked)
- Hornbostel–Sachs classification: 321.322-71 (Composite chordophone sounded by a bow)
- Developed: 20th century

Playing range
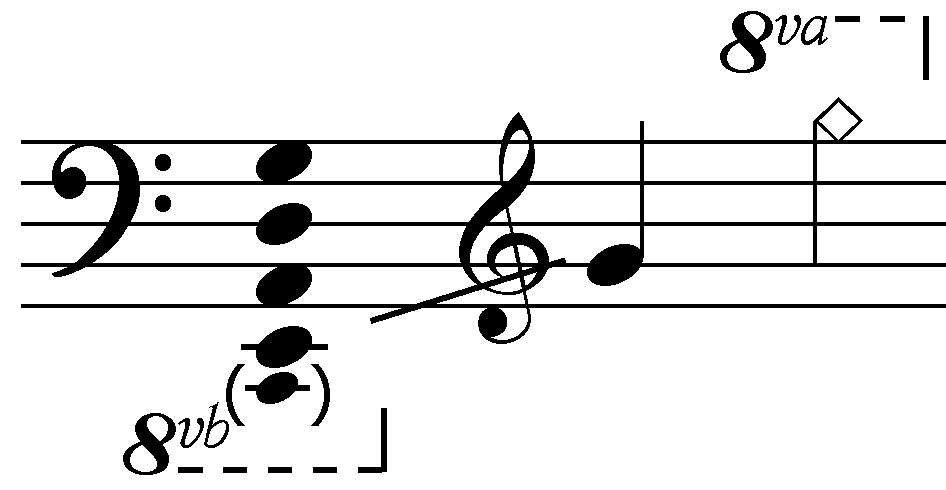

Related instruments
- Viol; Viola; Cello; Bass guitar; Acoustic bass guitar; Double bass; Diyingehu; Bazantar

Musicians
- List of double bassists

The electric upright bass (EUB) is an instrument that can perform the musical function of a double bass. It requires only a minimal or 'skeleton' body to produce sound because it uses a pickup and electronic amplifier and loudspeaker. Therefore, a large resonating structure is not required to project the sound into the air. This minimal body greatly reduces the bulk and weight of the instrument. EUBs must always be connected to an amplifier and speaker cabinet to produce an adequate audible sound. The EUB retains enough of the features of the double bass so that double bass players are able to perform on it.

== Types ==
There are two types: solid-body EUBs and hollowbody EUBs. Solid-body EUBs have no hollow enclosure for the body and, as such, they produce almost no sound without electronic amplification. Solid-body EUBs are connected to an amplifier for practice and live performances. Hollowbody EUBs have a wooden enclosure, which, whilst having a much smaller hollow body cavity than that of a double bass, is still large enough to give the instrument some sound output without amplification, at least for individual practice in a small room.

For performing it is connected to an amplifier and speaker. Though the EUB retains some of the tonal characteristics of the double bass, being electronically amplified it produces its own, unique sound. The size and shape of EUB bodies varies. Some EUBs have a very small body, which makes the instrument smaller and lighter in weight. Some EUBs have larger bodies, including the upper bouts, to aid the player in performing higher pitches.

== Electronics ==
Some EUBs have built-in pickups and volume controls, similar in function to the pickups and knobs on an electric bass (also called the bass guitar). Some EUBs are sold without an onboard pickup or knobs; a player using this instrument would need to purchase a piezoelectric (or magnetic) pickup separately and then attach the pickup to the body or bridge.

== Playing ==
EUBs sometimes have a long endpin to support the instrument at the appropriate height although some EUBs can be mounted on a stand for playing. As with the double bass, an EUB can be played standing up or sitting on a stool.

== Usage ==
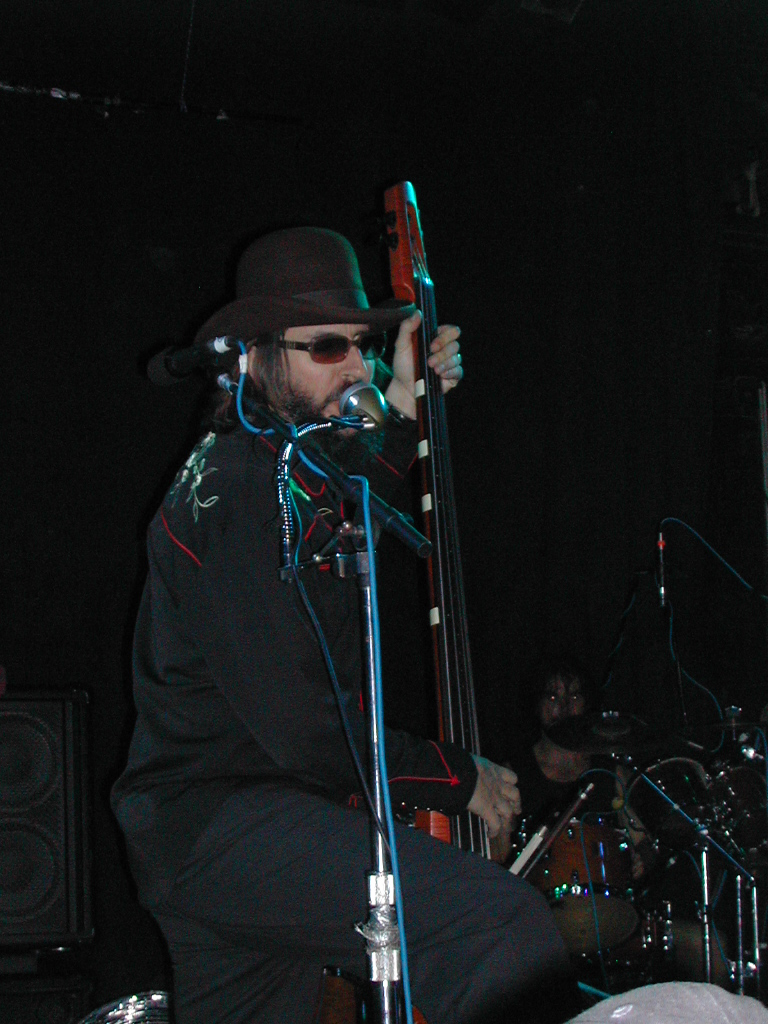
Les Claypool playing an NS Design EUB. The bow, held in a quiver, can be seen waiting for use.

EUBs are used in a wide range of styles of music, from jazz fusion and jazz to Cuban music and rock music. While four string EUBs are most common, using the same E, A, D, G tuning (from lowest to highest-pitched strings) as the double bass and bass guitar, 5-, 6-, 7- and 8-string models are also available (though instruments other than four or five strings are uncommon). Like the double bass, most EUBs can be plucked ("pizzicato") or bowed. For an EUB to be bowed, it must have a curved bridge, so that the bow can be used on all of the individual strings.

== History ==
The first production electric upright basses were developed independently in the mid-1930s by Regal, Vega and Rickenbacker. However, in the 1930s and 1940s, neither the transducers nor the amplification equipment then available could accurately reproduce the deep tones of the acoustic double bass. This may have contributed to the lack of public interest in either the electric upright basses or Paul Tutmarc's bass guitar-style instruments that emerged in the 1930s.

As technology has improved over the decades, EUBs have seen wide use in a variety of musical styles. Due to complications with transporting a traditional string bass, the EUB has probably seen more common use than other electronically amplified string instruments, such as the electric violin, viola and cello.

== Description ==
=== Scale length and tuning ===
The scale length of EUBs varies: some scales are 42", similar to most double basses, whilst other models have scale lengths of only 30" like a short scale bass guitar. The shorter scale can make it easier for bass guitarists to convert to the EUB. Some scales lie between these two extremes, for example 34", like a long scale bass guitar. The fingerboard extends over two octaves and usually has side dots for the player's reference. Regardless of scale length, the strings are usually tuned to E1, A1, D2, G2 (see Scientific pitch notation) at the same pitch as the double bass or bass guitar.

=== Aids in playing ===
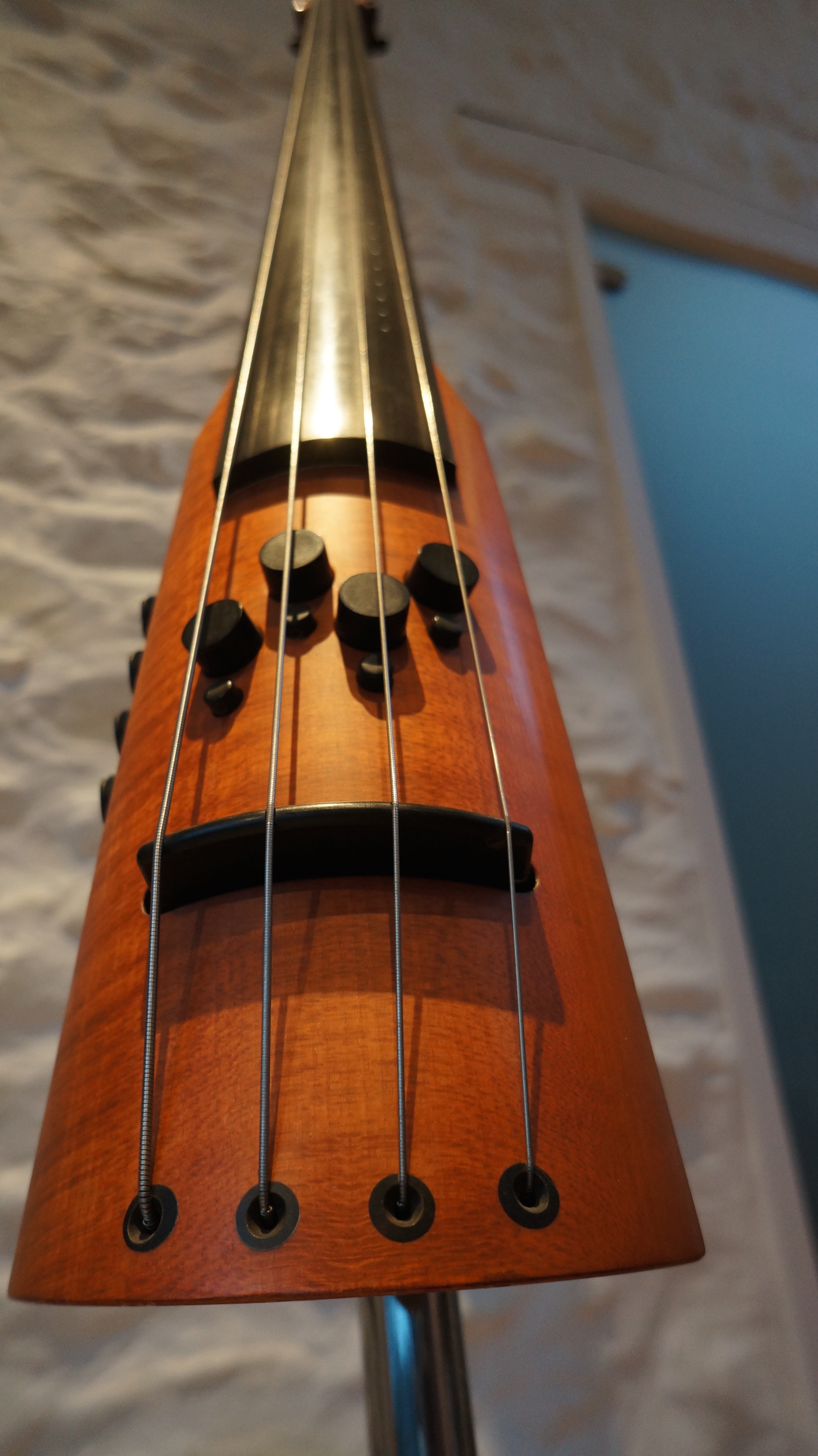
Close-up of an NS Design EUB, showing the fret marker dots used on some instruments.

Double bass players use features of the instrument such as the neck heel and edge of the upper bout as tactile positional references. The rear of the body of an upright bass is usually braced against the hip with player standing or knee if sitting. Many EUBs therefore mirror these features in their design.

There will often be a raised reference point about 1/3 down from the nut to the bridge at either the "D" or "Eb" position (where the notes "D" or "Eb" are found on the "G" string)) to represent the 'neck heel' of the acoustic bass. Many EUBs have wooden or metal bars to brace the instrument against the musician's body, to act as the upper bouts of a wooden double bass. The wooden or metal brace bars help the EUB to rest against the player's body in a position roughly similar to the way a double bass rests against the body. The most complete example of this is the Yamaha 'silent bass' which has a removable frame designed to match the outline of right hand side and left upper bout of an upright bass allowing for easy transference of double bass techniques. Most EUBs are fretless, but a small number are fretted, to facilitate their use by players of fretted electric bass. Some fretless EUBs have some fret markings as a visual aid, particularly for higher pitches.

=== Amplification ===
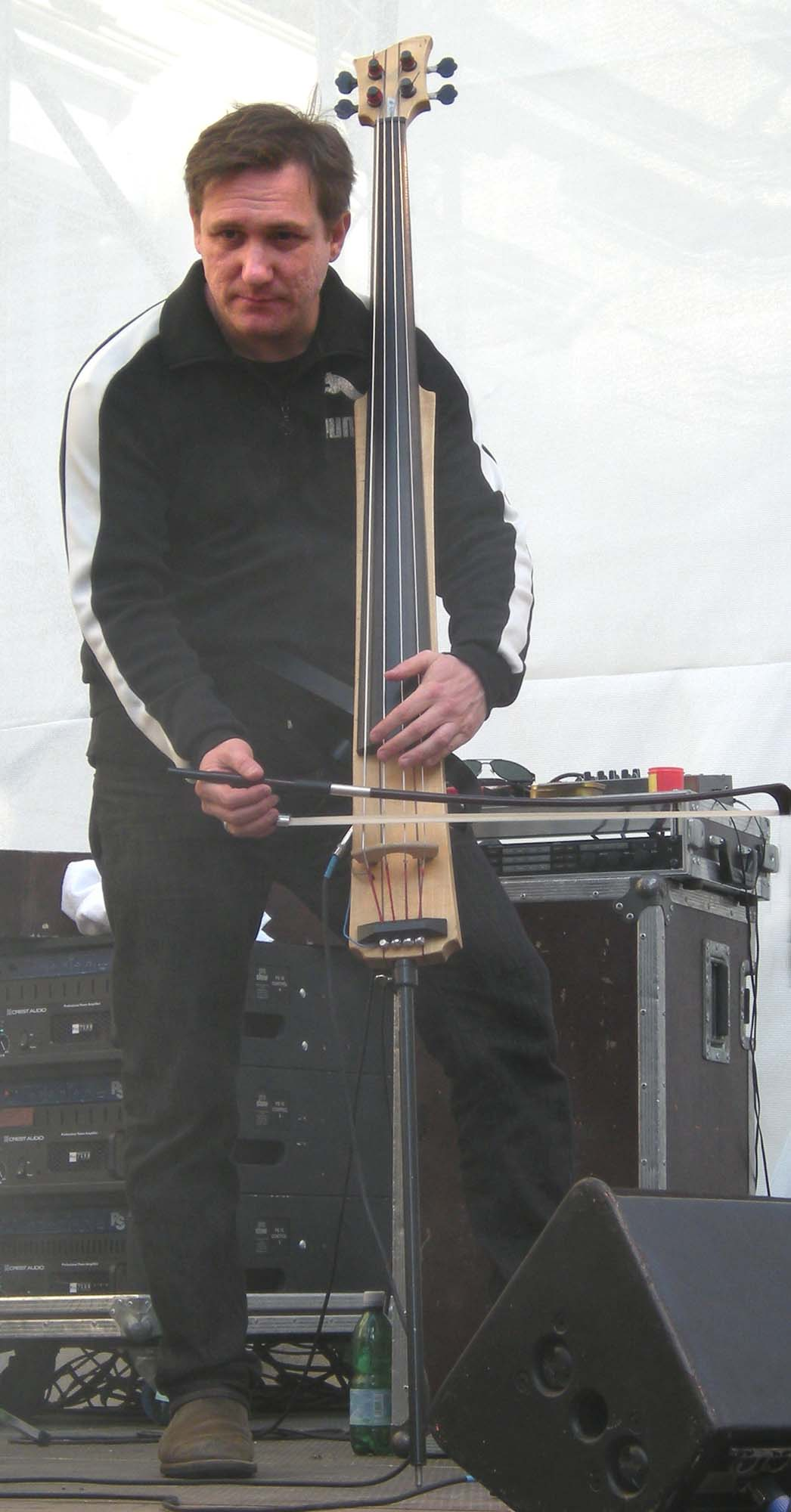
Hannes Strobl playing a bowed EUB through a bass amp.

Solid bodied EUBs produce very little sound without electronic amplification. Hollow-bodied EUBs produce a quiet tone that is loud enough for individual practice. However, since hollow-bodied EUBs do not have a large resonant cavity like a double bass, they cannot reproduce the lowest notes of the instrument without an amplifier. To amplify the EUB, the string vibrations are sensed with a pickup. Early EUBs used magnetic pickups similar to those in electric guitars, or percussive magnetic diaphragm pickups (e.g., the Ampeg Baby Bass). Many modern EUBs use piezoelectric pickups located in the bridge or a combination of pickup types. The signal from the pickup is usually preamplified and equalized with a preamplifier and then sent to a bass amplifier or a PA system. For practice in a hotel room or apartment, an EUB can also be connected to headphones.

Some EUBs have a hollow resonant chamber, such as the Eminence EUB, and some AlterEgo, Aria and Azola models. While these small resonant chambers are usually not large enough to provide much acoustic amplification, they do change the tone and response of the instrument. Condenser microphones can be used to amplify EUBs with hollow bodies, often in combination with other types of pickups.

EUB players who use the bow need to use the appropriate pickup, microphone, and preamplifier/equalizer combination to avoid the tendency for the amplified tone to be scratchy and high-sounding. To obtain a more natural arco sound, some performers use a condenser microphone for arco passages. Most bass pickups are designed to capture the pizzicato sounds of a double bass rather than the arco sounds. Some pickup manufacturers produce piezoelectric pickups that purportedly provide a natural reproduction of arco sound. Preamplifiers and equalizers for acoustic instruments or double basses can also be used to "roll off" the treble frequencies or "notch out" the "scratchy-sounding" frequencies. An external parametric equalizer could also be used to remove unwanted "scratchy" sounds.

== Types ==
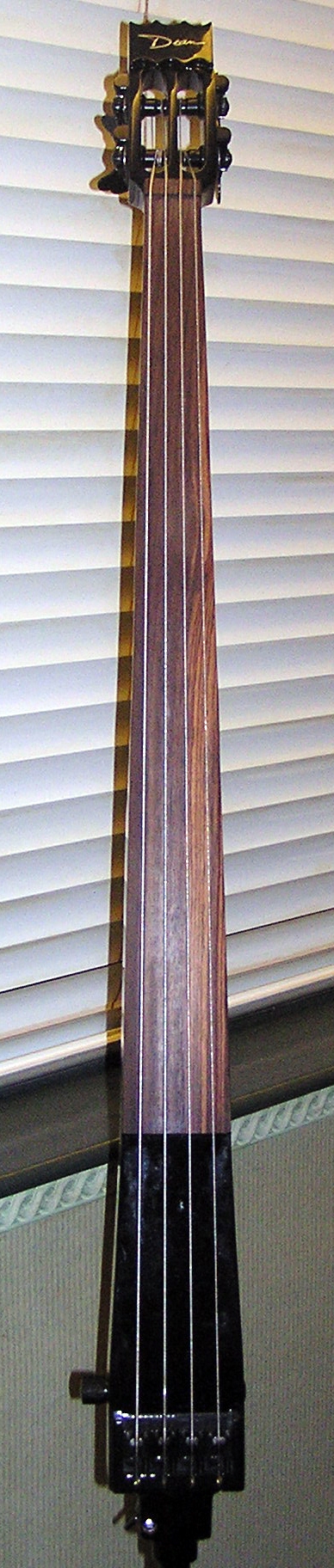
Dean Pace 4 string EUB

There are many varieties of EUBs available at present. Some EUBs cannot be used with a bow because of the large radius of the fingerboard and the flatness of the bridge. These types are therefore solely used for pizzicato playing. Other EUBs have a curved bridge which permits a bow to be used. While EUBs are often four-stringed, 5, 6, 7, and 8-string models are available. As well, solid, hollow and 'floating top' configurations are made. While hollow and 'floating top' models produce a more resonant tone, they are also more prone to feedback; as such, solid-body EUBs may be the best choice for bassists who play in loud styles, such as jam bands or metal fusion groups.

== Playing techniques ==
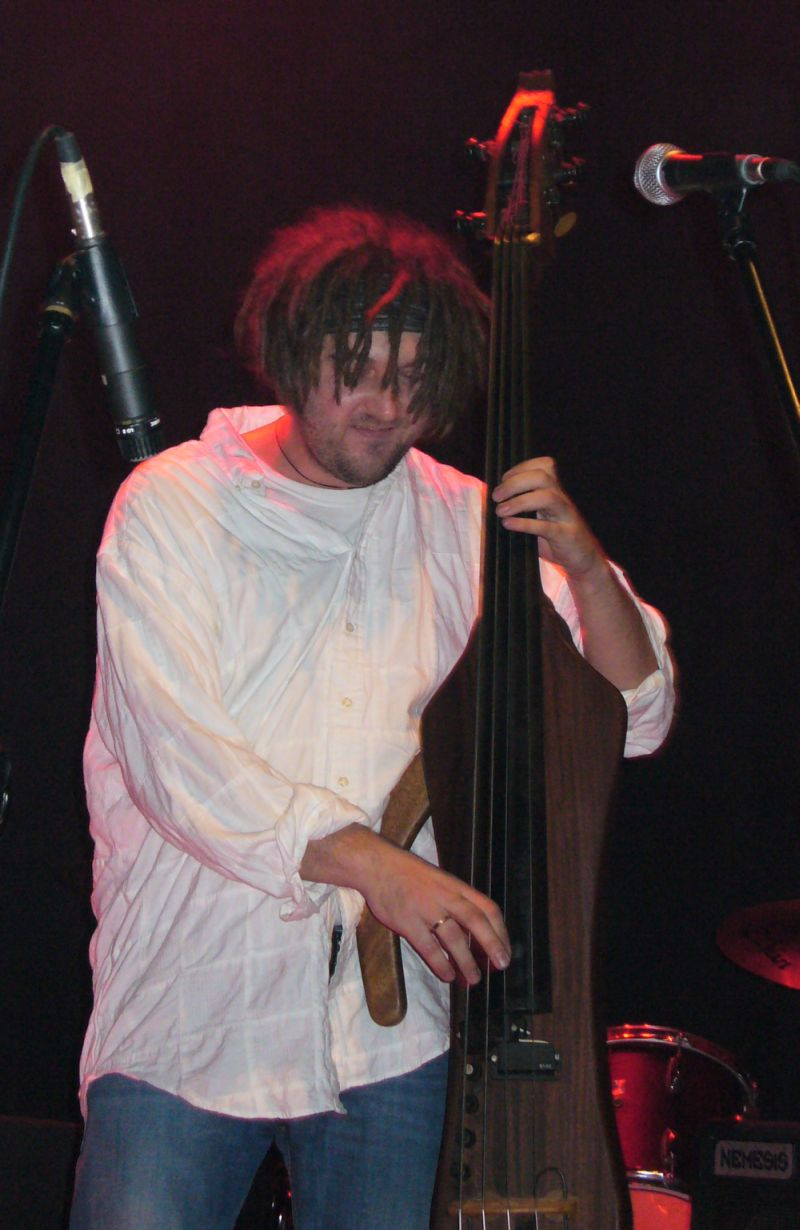
Karim Martusewicz, double-bassist for the band Voo Voo

The EUB is played in a similar manner to the double bass. All EUBs can be played pizzicato style. However, only those with a suitable fingerboard and arched bridge radius can be bowed. Some EUBs are designed with integral stands, freeing the player from the need to brace/support the instrument. More rarely, EUBs may be designed to be strapped on the body using guitar straps. The use of stands may make bowing much easier, especially for the beginner, because then the instrument does not have to be stabilized with the knee and thighs.

Like a double bass, the instrument may be played either standing or sitting on a tall stool. The optimum height for most players will be when the (index) finger in the first position (i.e., second fret on a fretted instrument) is at the same level as the player's eye. If the bass is higher than this, discomfort in the muscles of the neck may be experienced after playing long passages in the first position. If the bass is too low, the player may need to bend or stretch when attempting to play notes at the higher end of the fingerboard.

The strings are generally plucked with the sides of the top joints of the index and middle fingers, although sometimes the tips are used to produce a mellower tone or to facilitate rockabilly or bluegrass "slap" playing, while the thumb of the right hand rests against the side of the fingerboard. The strings are usually plucked over the fingerboard near the end. The left hand is used to stop the strings by pressing down with the fleshy part of the finger, generally using the ball of the thumb at the back of the neck to obtain pressure.

In the highest positions on the fingerboard, where the neck on an EUB gets considerably thicker, the left hand usage can be modified with the whole hand being brought round to the front of the instrument and the thumb taking the place of the index finger. These positions are called the 'thumb positions' in double bass parlance. In these positions, it is necessary to rest the neck of the bass against the player's left shoulder in order to support the neck against the pressure of fingers on the strings. On the shorter scale EUBs, bass guitar fingering can be used over a large portion of the fingerboard and thumb positions may not be necessary. On the longer scale models, due to the larger distances between notes, the double bass (Simandl) fingering method usually has to be used.

=== Comparison with the double bass ===
Since the EUB typically does not have a hollow sound chamber, or only includes a small sound chamber, the EUB is less prone to feedback than the double bass when amplified. To use a bow with an EUB, both the bridge and fingerboard need to be radiussed (given a curve). If the EUB's bridge and fingerboard are relatively flat, like those on an electric bass, then it is not possible to use the bow on the inner strings. By using suitable (gut or synthetic core) strings and adjusting the amplifier tone and distortion controls, an EUB can emulate an acoustic double bass. By using brighter (steel core) strings, tone controls and bass effects, an EUB can also take on a sound similar to a fretless bass guitar. Since the EUB transmits its sounds through a pickup, the tone is brighter than that of the acoustic double bass, which transmits its tone via the sound post to the back of the body. Compared to a double bass, the tone produced by an EUB is much less modified by its wooden 'body'.

== Genres and performers ==
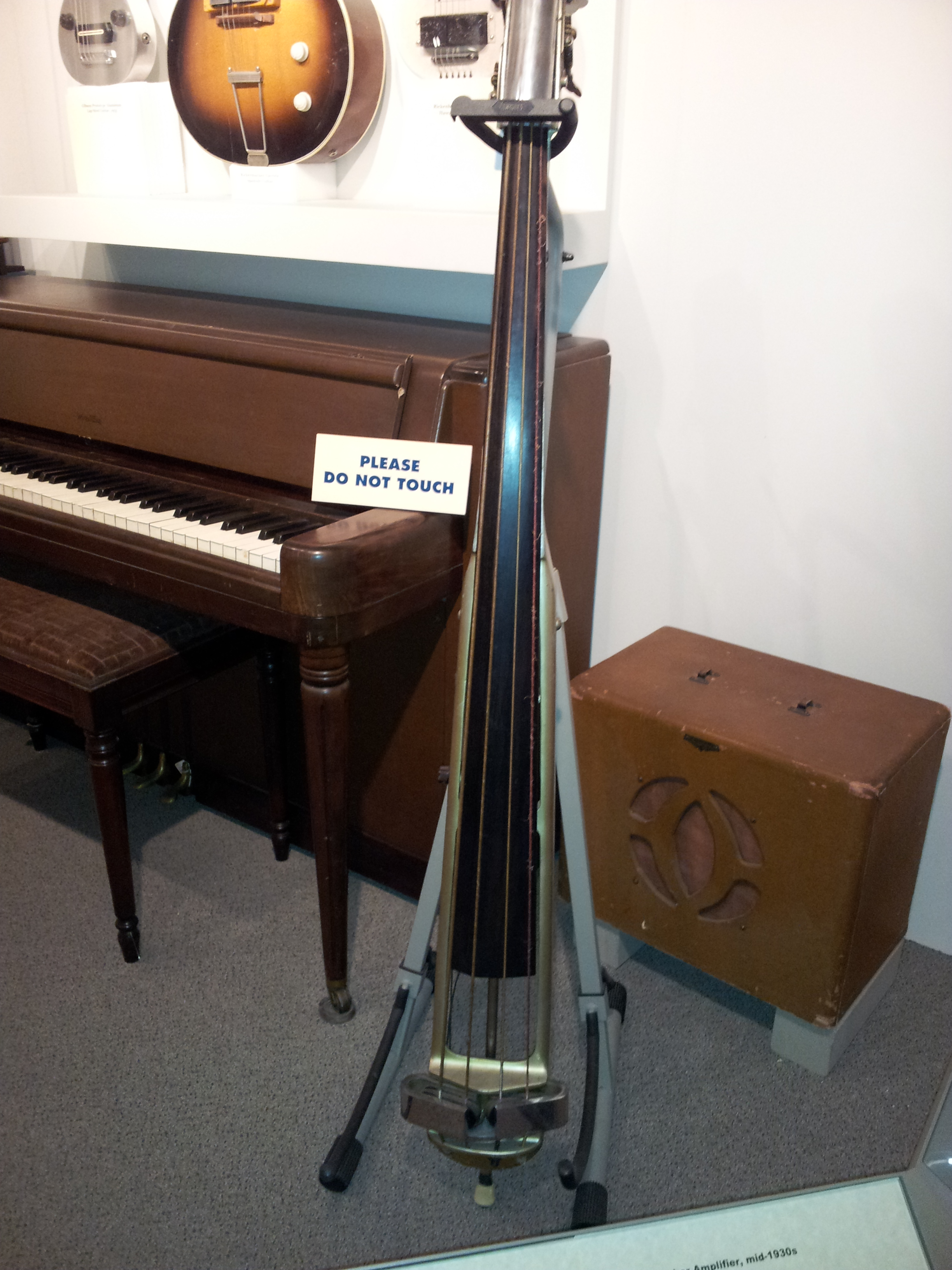
A Rickenbacker electric upright bass (1935) and amplifier (mid-1930s).

The Ampeg 'baby bass' has been popular in Cuban music since the 1960s being used by such performers as Cachao Lopez and Andy Gonzalez. Sting played a Dutch-made 'Van Zalinge' on some recordings. Eberhard Weber played an EUB on the 1975 album Yellow Fields using a combination of modes and raga-like riffs using the sustained tone of the EUB. Weber also drummed on the EUB, making a variety of percussive sounds. In free improvised music/avant garde jazz the Japanese bassist Motoharu Yoshizawa used a self-made 5-string EUB. More recently the Portuguese bassist Margarida Garcia has concentrated on the EUB in electro-acoustic improvisation. Houston-based musician Damon Smith uses a 7 string Ergo EUB tuned (low to high) BEADGCF for free jazz and improvised music.

In the 1990s and 2000s, Les Claypool used the EUB in several of his bands. Jeff Ament of Pearl Jam also regularly uses EUBs. In heavy metal, bassists such as Felipe Andreoli of Angra use EUBs; Andreoli uses a Brazilian-made D'Alegria instrument. Tony Levin plays an NS Design Electric Upright Bass, sometimes with pizzicato and sometimes with a bow. Italian bassist Don Bachi of Bandabardò regularly plays a plucked EUB. Jazz musician Brian Torff uses EUB, often incorporating percussive effects in his playing. Rob Wasserman used a 6 string EUB in wide range of rock contexts such as Ratdog.

In their 2008 tour, Queen + Paul Rodgers's touring bassist Danny Miranda played an EUB while performing "'39", followed by a "bass solo" by both Roger Taylor and Danny Miranda with Roger using his drumsticks as fingers in the strings. The Japanese band MUCC's bassist YUKKE used an electric upright bass during the promotional tours for their album Gokusai on the track "25ji no Yuutsu". Ævar Örn Sigurðsson of the Icelandic black/death metal act Zhrine uses an electric upright bass both in studio and live.

In the Metallica: S&M² concert (2019), Scott Pingel of the San Francisco Symphony notably played Cliff Burton's signature solo "Anesthesia (Pulling Teeth)," from the band's debut album, Kill 'Em All, on an EUB.

== See also ==
- Double bass
- Acoustic bass guitar
- Electric cello
