= Julien Musafia =

- Born: 1925; Bucharest, Romania
- Died: November 14, 2015 (aged 89–90)
- Instrument: Piano
- Spouse: Judith Musafia (1941-2025)

Julien Musafia (1925 – November 14, 2015) was an American pianist and musicologist.

== Biography ==
Musafia was born in Bucharest, Romania, in 1925. He moved to the United States in 1950, where he attended the University of California, Los Angeles (UCLA), attaining degrees in musicology and political science. He became professor of music at California State University, Long Beach, a position he held for over thirty years. There he founded the Consortium Musicum, which he directed between 1971 and 1993, and is a member of Phi Beta Kappa.

During his career, he performed alongside Israel Baker and Julius Berger. He is known for performing the works of George Enescu, as well as collaborating with Dmitri Shostakovich to publish a definitive edition of Shostakovich's 24 Preludes and Fugues (published in 1973). He also served as the artistic director of the Shostakovich Festival in Los Angeles

He was married flautist and writer Judith Musafia (1941–2025). They had two sons: Dimitri Musafia, a violin case maker based in Cremona, Italy, and Dominik Musafia.

According to his son, Dmitri, Musafia possessed absolute pitch.
