= Fingering (music) =

Finger and hand positioning for musical instruments

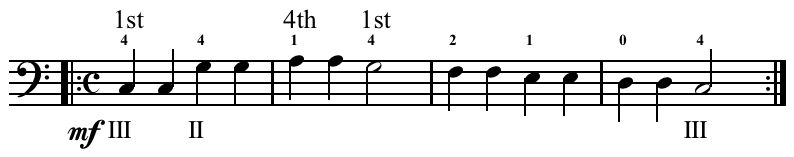
Hypothetical cello fingering of "Twinkle, Twinkle, Little Star" with hand positions with ordinals, fingers with numbers, and strings indicated with Roman numerals. The A could instead have been played open like the D and the entire line could have been in 1st position.

In music, fingering, or on stringed instruments sometimes also called stopping, is the choice of which fingers and hand positions to use when playing certain musical instruments. Fingering typically changes throughout a piece; the challenge of choosing good fingering for a piece is to make the hand movements as comfortable as possible without changing hand position too often. A fingering can be the result of the working process of the composer, who puts it into the manuscript, an editor, who adds it into the printed score, or the performer, who puts his or her own fingering in the score or in performance.

Fingering ... also stopping ... (1) A system of symbols (usually Arabic numbers) for the fingers of the hand (or some subset of them) used to associate specific notes with specific fingers ... . (2) Control of finger movements and position to achieve physiological efficiency, acoustical accuracy [frequency and amplitude] (or effect) and musical articulation.

A substitute fingering is an alternative to the indicated fingering, not to be confused with a finger substitution. Depending on the instrument, not all the fingers may be used. For example, saxophonists do not use the right thumb, bowed instruments (usually) only use the fingers and not the thumbs, and harpists pluck with every digit except the little finger.

== Brass instruments ==
Fingering applies to the rotary and piston valves employed on many brass instruments.

The trombone, a fully chromatic brass instrument without valves, employs equivalent numbered notation for slide positions rather than fingering.

== Keyboard instruments ==
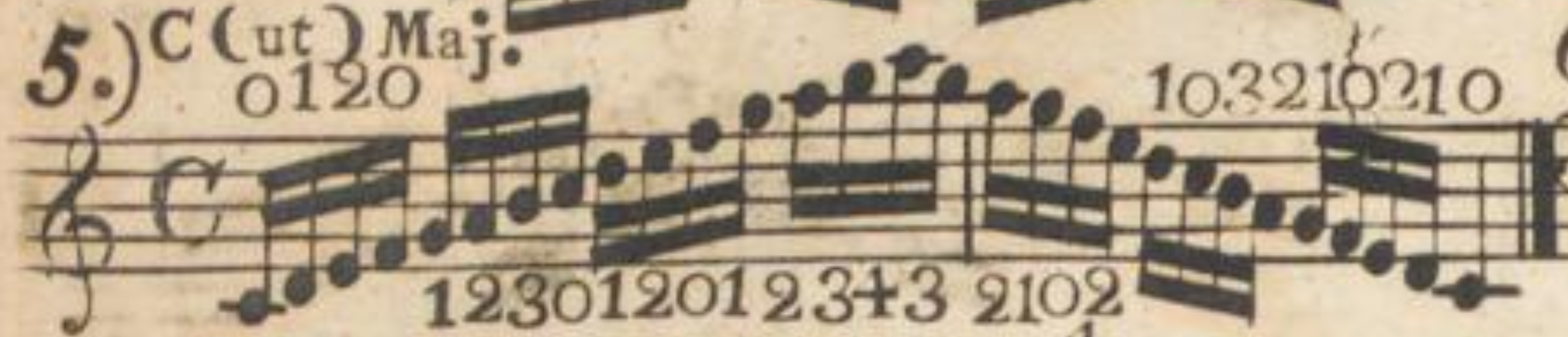
English fingering · zero variant

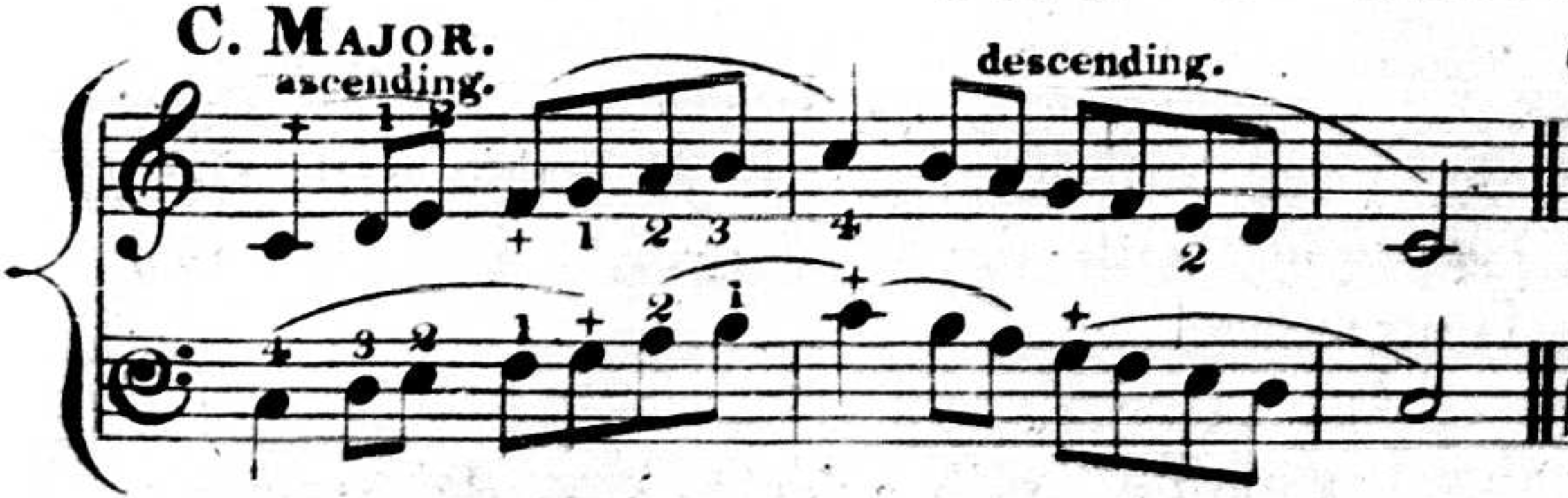
English fingering · cross variant

In notation for keyboard instruments, numbers are used to relate to the fingers themselves, not the hand position on the keyboard. In modern scores, the fingers are numbered from 1 to 5 on each hand: the thumb is 1, the index finger is 2, the middle finger is 3, the ring finger is 4 and the little finger is 5.

Earlier usage varied by region. In Britain in the 19th century, the thumb was shown by a cross (+) or number 0 and the fingers were numbered from 1 to 4. This was known as "English fingering" while the other way (from 1 to 5) was known as "continental fingering". However, from the beginning of the 20th century the British adopted the continental (1 to 5) fingering, which remains in use everywhere.

=== Piano ===
After Cristofori invented the hammered-string pianoforte from the plucked-string harpsichord in 1700, and after it became popular in the decades after 1740, eventually replacing the harpsichord, the piano technique developed tremendously (it was parallel with the piano builders´ progress and piano pedagogy, and as part of it piano fingering changed).

There are only a few publications about piano fingering:

- Carl Philipp Emanuel Bach (Note: Carl Philipp Emanuel Bach is one of the sons of Johann Sebastian Bach, who also became a well-respected keyboard performer.) dedicated several paragraphs to fingering for keyboards in his 1762 book on playing the clavier.
- The British pianist Tobias Matthay wrote a 1908 pamphlet on fingering.
- Julien Musafia published a book in 1971 that includes fingering examples, mostly drawn from the Beethoven's Violin and Piano Sonatas and from the Preludes and Fugues of Shostakovich.
- Rami Bar-Niv published a book in 2012 that teaches piano fingering.

=== Piano Fingering Chart ===
A clear, well‑structured fingering chart accelerates the learning process by making finger positions instantly readable. It helps learners avoid common mistakes and greatly reduces the frustration many beginners face when learning a new instrument.

=== History ===
Johann Sebastian Bach introduced an innovation in fingering for the organ and the clavier. (Note: A similar, although according to Bach's son Carl Philipp Emanuel Bach less radical, innovation was introduced by François Couperin, at roughly the same time in 1716, in his book L'art de toucher le clavecin.) Prior to Bach, playing rarely involved the thumb. Bach's new fingering retained many features of the conventional fingering up until that point, including the passing of one finger under or over another (Note: Playing many of Bach's works requires pass-over / pass-under fingering, especially passing the third finger over the fourth or the fourth finger over the fifth.) but introduced the far greater use of the thumb. Modern fingering also uses the thumb to a similar extent, and involves the passing of the thumb under the other fingers, but does not, as Bach's did, generally involve the passing of any other fingers over or under one another.

Cello first position fingerings

In the 1980s Lindley and Boxall showed that the above relies solely on C.P.E. Bach's testimony: All the extant fingerings from J.S. Bach and his circle use the ancient methods, with very limited use of the thumb. More recently it has been shown that all his harpsichord works and most of the organ works as well are playable with the old technique.

== Bowed string instruments ==
On string instruments fingers are numbered from 1 to 4, beginning with the index finger, the thumb not being counted because it does not normally play on a string, and '0' indicating an open string. In those cases on string instruments where the thumb is used (such as high notes on a cello in the special thumb position"), it is represented by a symbol the shape of an 'O' with a vertical stem below (somewhat similar to 'Ǫ' or ϙ, for instance). Guitar music indicates thumb, occasionally used to finger bass notes on the low E string, with a 'T'. Position may be indicated through ordinal numbers (e.g., "third" as opposed to "three") or (uncommon) Roman numerals. A string may also be indicated through Roman numerals, often I-IV, or by its open-string note. A change in positions is referred to as a shift. Guitar music indicates position with Roman numerals and string designations with circled numbers.

== Plucked string instruments ==
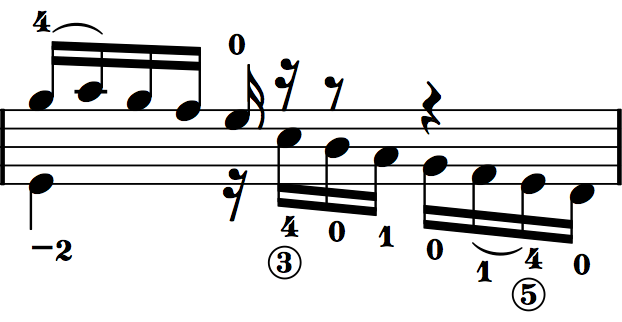
Fingered music for guitar: the numbers 1 to 4 indicate the stopping fingers, 0 an open note, circled numbers strings, and dashed numbers slipping

The classical guitar also has a fingering notation system for the plucking hand, known as pima (or less commonly pimac), abbreviations of Spanish; where p=pulgar (thumb), i=índice (index finger), m=medio (middle finger), a=anular (ring finger) and, very rarely, c=chico (little finger). It is usually only notated in scores where a passage is particularly difficult, or requires specific fingering for the plucking hand. Otherwise, plucking-hand fingering is generally left to the discretion of the guitarist.

== Woodwind instruments ==
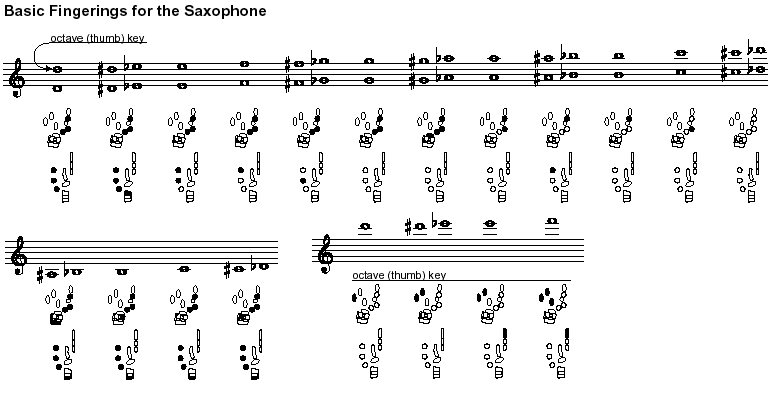
Saxophone fingerings for normal range

Fingering of woodwind instruments is not always simple or intuitive, depending on how the acoustic impedance of the bore is affected by the distribution and size of apertures along its length, leading to the formation of standing waves at the desired pitch. Several alternate fingerings may exist for any given pitch.

Simple flutes (including recorders) as well as bagpipe chanters have open holes which are closed by the pads of the player's fingertips. Some such instruments use simple keywork to extend the player's reach for one or two notes. The keywork on instruments such as modern flutes, clarinets, or oboes is elaborate and variable. Modern flutes typically use the Boehm system of keywork, while clarinets typically use a similarly named system invented by Hyacinthe Klosé. In Germany and Austria a different system of clarinet keywork, the Öhler system, is most used.

== Cross-fingering ==
Cross-fingering is any fingering, "requiring a closed hole or holes below an open one".

"Opening successive tone holes in woodwind instruments shortens the standing wave in the bore. However, the standing wave propagates past the first open hole, so its frequency can be affected by closing other tone holes further downstream. This is called cross fingering, and in some instruments is used to produce the 'sharps and flats' missing from their natural scales."

In the Baroque period cross-fingering improved, allowing music in an increasing variety of keys, but in the Classical and Romantic periods flute design changes – particularly larger tone holes – made cross-fingering less practical, while mechanical keywork increasingly provided an easy alternative to playing chromatic notes without cross-fingerings. The Boehm system was developed in part to replace cross-fingerings. The first key added to the flute, the short F key, crossed the flute's body, replacing a fingering with an open hole above a closed one, and is presumably the origin of the name "cross" for such crossfingerings.

Fork fingering is any fingering where a central hole is uncovered while the holes to each side are kept covered. One advantage of the Giorgi flute was that it removed the necessity of fork fingering for playing chromatic notes.

== False fingering and alternate fingering ==
The term false fingering is used in instruments such as woodwinds, brass, and stringed instruments where different fingerings can produce the same note, but where the timbre or tone quality is distinctly different from each other. If the tone quality is not distinctly different between the two notes, the term alternate fingering is often used instead.

When the note is played in such a way as to draw the distinction from the expected tone quality (Note: Desired tonal quality for a note varies, depending on the nuances of musical passage it appears in.) it is often called a false fingering. The technique is common in jazz music, especially on wind instruments such as the saxophone.

On a guitar, for example, the same pitch can be played on a heavier, over-wound string, rather than a plain single-wire string (solid wire string). The note played on the heavier string will sound significantly different from one played on a single wire string, so playing the same pitch on differently made strings in short succession can accentuate the different tone colors without actually changing the pitch.

== See also ==
- finger numbering
- fingerboard
- monochord
- split sharp
