= Position (music) =

Violin First Position Fingerings

On a string instrument, position is the relative location of the hand on the instrument's neck, indicated by ordinal numbers (e.g., 3rd). Fingering, independent of position, is indicated by numbers, 1-4. Different positions on the same string are reached through shifting.

With experience, string players become accustomed to the required shape and position of the left hand. Some positions are located relative to certain touch references, or landmarks on the instrument. For example, fourth position on the cello (used in the example below) has the player's thumb resting in the "saddle" of the neck root. Similarly, higher positions on the violin make use of the instrument's "shoulder" (treble-side edge of the top's upper bout) as a touch reference. Some electric string instruments, without a traditionally shaped body, still incorporate a reference feature imitating that shoulder's shape.

== Shifting and notation on bowed instruments ==
On a string instrument, shifting, or a shift, is a movement of the fingers of the left hand from one position to another on the same string. When done skillfully, shifting avoids string noise.

A shift is usually indicated by a fingering number (1–4) on the first note after the shift. Additionally, the string or position may be indicated as well, following one of several notation conventions. The position can be indicated by ordinal numbers (e.g., "3rd") or a roman numeral (e.g., "III. pos", "III. Pos", or just "III"). The string can be indicated by string name (e.g., "sul G") or by a roman number (counting from high to low pitches, e.g., "II" for the A string on a violin).

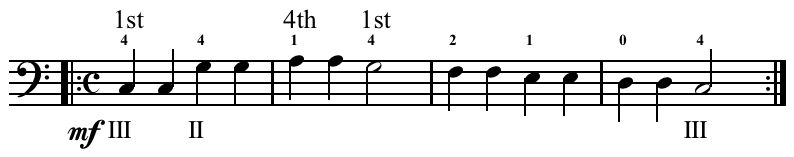
Possible string technique and notation demonstrated on a bit of "Twinkle, Twinkle, Little Star", played on a cello. Note the string change to A avoided through shifting and the string change to the G string: the A could have been played open like the D and the entire line could have been in 1st position.

Although the technique must have been known, based on the fingering and repertoire, treatises do not discuss explicitly it until the 19th century. Among the earliest appearances is the term démancher (lit. "to shift") in Michel Corrette's L'école d'Orphée (Paris, 1738).

== Guitar ==
In reference to classical guitar, "Fernando Sor recommends that one should 'be sparing of the operations called barring and shifting'."

== Trombone position ==
The trombone produces notes within its range by extending the main slide to different positions. In first position, the length of the bore is at its shortest; seventh position puts the slide at its furthest extension, at the edge of the inner slide's stockings. (These are sections of slightly greater diameter at the ends of the inner slide tubes.) Positions 3 and 4 may be located by referring the player's right hand to the bell of the instrument. Each player "has a different way of visualizing where the positions of the slide trombone are in relation to each other" Positions, especially in the higher register, may need to be shortened or lengthened (sharpened or flattened) to play in tune. Lower-numbered (shorter) positions are closer together than higher-numbered ones. Positions six and seven are primarily useful in the lower part of the trombone's range.

Some notes may be sounded at more than one position; for example, D4 may be sounded either in position 1 or 4. As a result, trombonists often spend time studying a part to determine how to approach a particular phrase.

== See also ==
- Stopped note
- Thumb position
