= How a Mosquito Operates =

1912 film

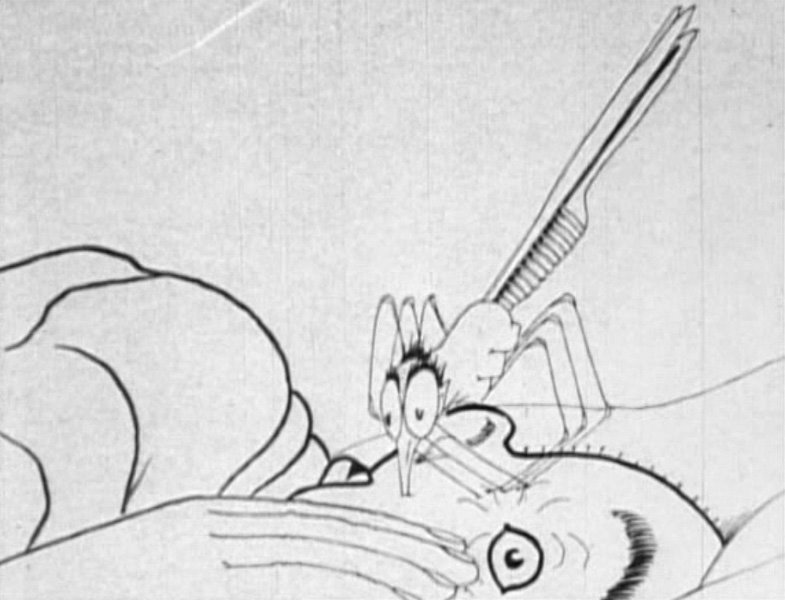
- Directed by: Winsor McCay
- Release date: January 8, 1912
- Running time: 6 minutes
- Country: United States
- Language: Silent with English intertitles

How a Mosquito Operates is a 1912 silent animated short film by the American cartoonist Winsor McCay. The six-minute short depicts a giant mosquito tormenting a sleeping man. The film is one of the earliest works of animation, and its technical quality is considered far ahead of its time. It is also known under the titles The Story of a Mosquito and Winsor McCay and his Jersey Skeeters.

McCay had a reputation for his proficient drawing skills, best remembered in the elaborate cartooning of the children's comic strip Little Nemo in Slumberland he began in 1905. He delved into the emerging art of animation with the film Little Nemo (1911), and followed its success by adapting an episode of his comic strip Dream of the Rarebit Fiend into How a Mosquito Operates. McCay gave the film a more coherent story and more developed characterization than in the Nemo film, with naturalistic timing, motion, and weight in the animation.

How a Mosquito Operates had an enthusiastic reception when McCay first showed it as part of his vaudeville act. He further developed the character animation he introduced in Mosquito with his best-known animated work, Gertie the Dinosaur (1914).

The film is also the first animation known to incorporate smear frames.

== Synopsis ==
How a Mosquito Operates (1912)

A man looks around apprehensively before entering his room. A giant mosquito (Note: In an overview of McCay's works in 1975, John Canemaker refers to the mosquito by the name Steve.) with a top hat and briefcase flies in after him through a transom window. It repeatedly feeds on the sleeping man, who tries in vain to shoo it away. The mosquito eventually drinks itself so full that it explodes.

== Style ==
How a Mosquito Operates is one of the earliest examples of line-drawn animation. McCay used minimal backgrounds and capitalized on strengths of the film medium, then in its infancy, by focusing on the physical, visual action of the characters. No intertitles interrupt the silent visuals.

As the mosquito drinks, its abdomen fills, appearing to be in line with its bodily structure in a realistic way. The heavier it becomes, the more it is show to have difficulty in keeping its balance. In its excitement as it feeds, it does push-ups on the man's nose and flips its hat in the air.

The mosquito has a personality: egotistical, persistent, and calculating (as when it whets its proboscis on a stone wheel). It makes eye contact with the viewers and waves at them. McCay balances horror with humor, as when the mosquito finds itself so engorged with blood that it must lie down.

== Background ==
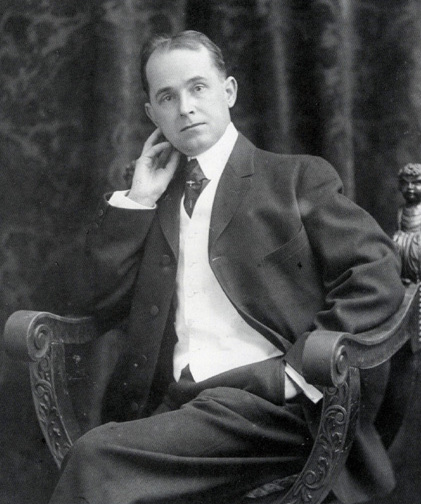
Winsor McCay had built a reputation for his drawing skills in his newspaper comic strips before pioneering in animation.

Winsor McCay (c. 1869–1934) (Note: Different accounts have given McCay's birth year as 1867, 1869, and 1871. His birth records are not extant.) developed prodigiously accurate and detailed drawing skills early in life. As a young man, he earned a living drawing portraits and posters in dime museums, and attracted large crowds with his ability to draw quickly in public. McCay began working as a full-time newspaper illustrator in 1898, and started drawing comic strips in 1903. His greatest comic-strip success was the children's fantasy Little Nemo in Slumberland, which he launched in 1905. McCay began performing on the vaudeville circuit the following year, doing chalk talks—performances in which he drew in front of a live audience.

Inspired by flip books his son Robert brought home, McCay said he "came to see the possibility of making moving pictures" of his cartoons. He declared himself "the first man in the world to make animated cartoons", though the American James Stuart Blackton and the French Émile Cohl were among those who had made earlier ones, and McCay had photographed his first animated short under Blackton's supervision. McCay featured his Little Nemo characters in the film, which debuted in movie theatres in 1911, and he soon incorporated it into his vaudeville act.

The animated sequences in Little Nemo have no plot: much like the early experiments of Émile Cohl, McCay used his first film to demonstrate the medium's capabilities—with fanciful sequences demonstrating motion for its own sake. In Mosquito he wanted greater believability, and balanced exaggerated action with naturalistic timing, motion, and weight. Since he had already demonstrated in his first film that pictures could be made to move, in the second he introduced a simple story.

Vaudeville acts and humor magazines commonly joked about large New Jersey mosquitoes they called "Jersey skeeters", and McCay had used mosquitoes in his comic strips—including a Little Nemo episode (Note: Wikimedia Commons has a file available for this episode from October 23, 1910.) in which a swarm of mosquitoes attack Nemo after he returns from a trip to Mars. McCay took the idea for the film from a June 5, 1909, episode of his comic strip Dream of the Rarebit Fiend, in which a mosquito (without top hat or briefcase) gorges itself on an alcoholic until it becomes so bloated and drunk that it cannot fly away.

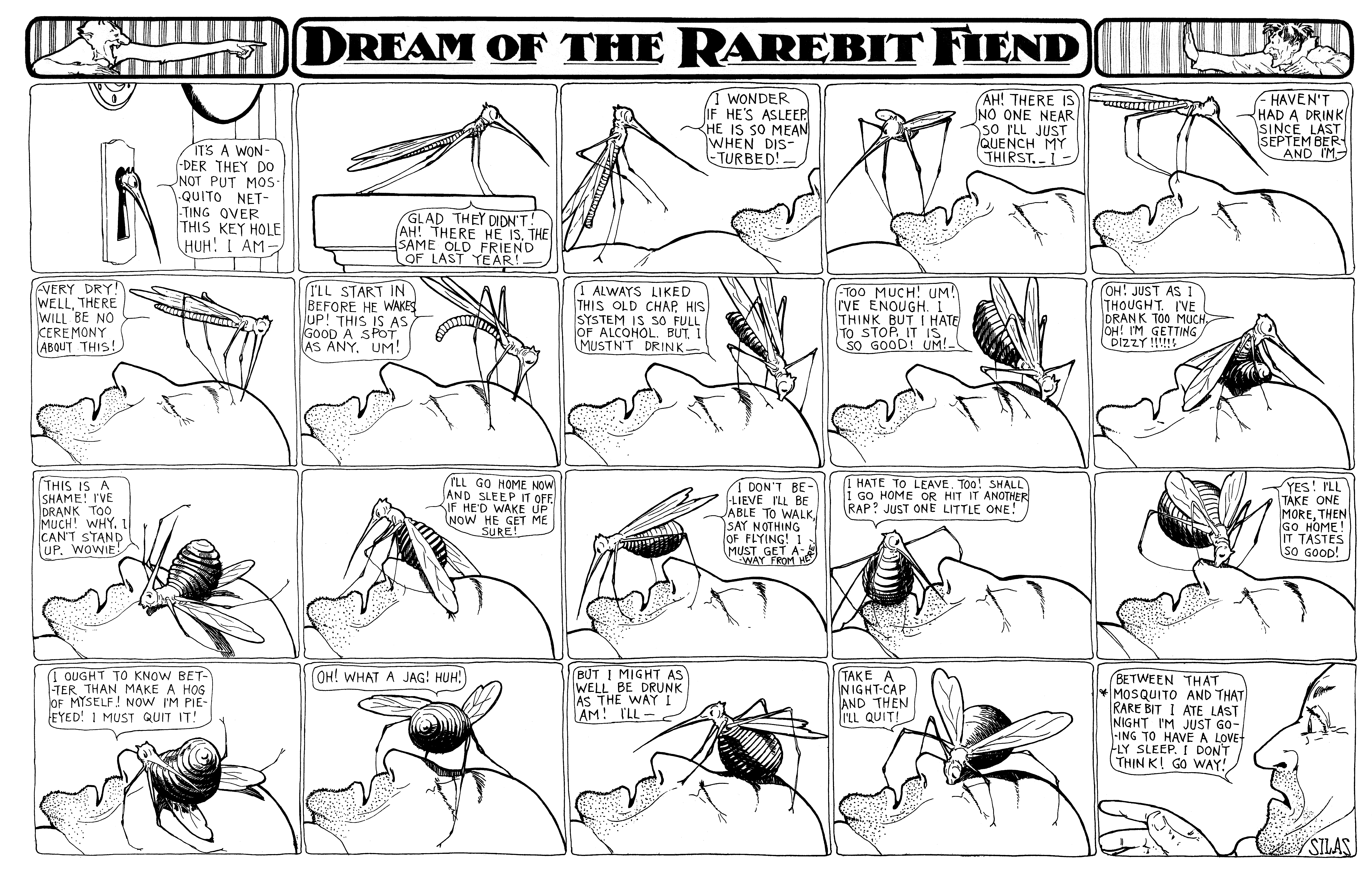
McCay based the film on the June 5, 1909, episode of his Dream of the Rarebit Fiend comic strip.

== Production and release ==
McCay began working on the film in May 1911. Shortly after, he left the employ of the New York Herald for the newspapers of William Randolph Hearst—a sign of his rising stardom. A magazine advertisement in July announced a "moving picture, containing six thousand sketches ... [that] will be a 'release' for vaudeville next season by Mr. McCay. The film will be named How a Mosquito Operates."

McCay made the 6 000 drawings on translucent rice paper. The film came before the development of cel animation, in which animators draw on clear sheets of celluloid and lay them over static backgrounds. Thus, on each drawing McCay had to redraw the background, which appears to waver slightly due to the difficulty of reproducing it perfectly each time. McCay re-used some of the drawings to loop repeated actions, a technique he used once in Little Nemo and more extensively in his later films.

McCay finished drawing the film in December 1911. A snowstorm hit when he was to have the drawings taken to Vitagraph Studios for photographing, so he hired an enclosed horse-drawn taxi to have them taken there. The taxi's location was unknown, and a few days later the police found the abandoned taxi with the drawings unharmed inside, the horses two to three miles away. The first attempt to shoot the artwork resulted in unacceptable amounts of flicker due to the arc lighting the studio used, and it was re-shot. The completed work came to 600 feet of film.

How a Mosquito Operates debuted in January 1912 as part of McCay's vaudeville act, which he toured through that spring and summer. Film producer Carl Laemmle bought the distribution rights under the restriction that he not have the film shown in the US until McCay had finished using it in his vaudeville act. Universal–Jewel released the film in 1916 under the title Winsor McCay and his Jersey Skeeters, and it has sometimes been called The Story of a Mosquito.

In a lost live-action prologue, McCay and his daughter, "pestered to death by mosquitoes" at their summer home in New Jersey, find a professor who speaks the insects' language. The professor tells McCay to "make a series of drawings to illustrate just how the insect does its deadly work," and after months of work McCay invites the professor to watch the film.

== Reception and legacy ==
How a Mosquito Operates was released at a time when audience demand for animation outstripped the studios' ability to supply it. According to animator Chris Webster, at a time when most studios struggled to make animation merely work, McCay showed a mastery of the medium and a sense of how to create believable motion.

John Randolph Bray's The Artist's Dream (1913) bore thematic resemblance to McCay's first two films, but Bray denied McCay's influence.

The film opened to large audiences, and was well received. The Detroit Times described audiences laughing until they cried, and "[going] home feeling that [they] had seen one of the best programs" in the theater's history. The paper called the film "a marvelous arrangement of colored drawings", referring to the final explosive sequence, which McCay had hand-painted red (colored versions of this sequence have not survived). The New York Morning Telegraph remarked that "[McCay's] moving pictures of his drawings have caused even film magnates to marvel at their cleverness and humor". Audiences found his animation so lifelike that they suggested he had traced the characters from photographs or resorted to tricks using wires:

I drew a great ridiculous mosquito, pursuing a sleeping man, peeking through a keyhole and pouncing on him over the transom. My audiences were pleased, but declared the mosquito was operated by wires to get the effect before the cameras.

— Winsor McCay, "From Sketchbook to Animation", 1927

To show that he had not used such tricks, McCay chose a creature for his next film that could not have been photographed: a Brontosaurus. The film, Gertie the Dinosaur, debuted as part of his vaudeville act in 1914. Before he brought out Gertie, he hinted at the film's subject in interviews in which he spoke of animation's potential for "serious and educational work".

American animator John Randolph Bray's first film, The Artist's Dream, appeared in 1913; it alternates live-action and animated sequences, and features a dog that explodes after eating too many sausages. Though these aspects recall McCay's first two films, Bray said that he did not know of McCay's efforts while working on The Artist's Dream.

Following Mosquito, animated films tended to be story-based; for decades they rarely drew attention to the technology underlying it, and live-action sequences became infrequent. Animator and McCay biographer John Canemaker commended McCay for his ability to imbue a mosquito with character and personality. Canemaker stated that the technical quality of McCay's animation was far ahead of its time, unmatched until the Disney studios gained prominence in the 1930s with films such as Snow White and the Seven Dwarfs (1937).

== See also ==
- History of animation
- List of films in the public domain in the United States
