= Little Nemo (1911 film) =

Silent animated short film by Winsor McCay

Winsor McCay: The Famous Cartoonist of the N.Y. Herald and His Moving Comics
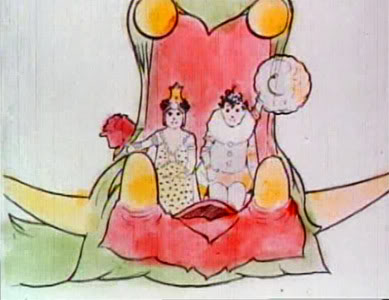
- Little Nemo and the Princess ride away in the mouth of a dragon
- Directed by: Winsor McCay
- Release date: April 8, 1911
- Running time: 11:33
- Country: United States
- Language: Silent with English intertitles

Winsor McCay: The Famous Cartoonist of the N.Y. Herald and His Moving Comics, more commonly known as Little Nemo, is a 1911 silent animated short film by American cartoonist Winsor McCay. One of the earliest animated films and McCay's first, it featured characters from McCay's comic strip Little Nemo in Slumberland. Its expressive character animation distinguished the film from the experiments of earlier animators.

Inspired by flip books his son brought home, McCay came to see the potential of the animated film medium. He claimed to be the first to make such films, though James Stuart Blackton and Émile Cohl were among those who preceded him. The short's four thousand drawings on rice paper were shot at Vitagraph Studios under Blackton's supervision. Most of the film's running time is made up of a live-action sequence in which McCay bets his colleagues that he can make drawings that move. He wins the bet with four minutes of animation in which the Little Nemo characters perform, interact, and metamorphose to McCay's whim.

Little Nemo debuted in movie theaters on April 8, 1911, and four days later McCay began using it as part of his vaudeville act. Its good reception motivated him to hand-color each of the animated frames of the original black-and-white film. The film's success led McCay to devote more time to animation. He followed up Little Nemo with How a Mosquito Operates in 1912 and his best-known film, Gertie the Dinosaur, in 1914.

In 2009, Little Nemo was selected for preservation in the United States National Film Registry by the Library of Congress as being "culturally, historically, or aesthetically significant".

== Background ==
James Stuart Blackton used chalk drawings to animate Humorous Phases of Funny Faces (1906).

Winsor McCay (c. 1867–71 – 1934) (Note: Different accounts have given McCay's birth year as 1867, 1869, and 1871. His birth records are not extant.) had worked prolifically as a commercial artist and cartoonist by the time he started making newspaper comic strips such as Dream of the Rarebit Fiend (1904–1911) (Note: Rarebit Fiend was revived between 1911 and 1913 under other titles, such as Midsummer Day Dreams and It Was Only a Dream.) and his signature strip Little Nemo in Slumberland (1905–1914). (Note: The strip was titled Little Nemo in Slumberland from 1905 to 1911, and In the Land of Wonderful Dreams from 1911 to 1914.) In 1906, McCay began performing on the vaudeville circuit, doing chalk talk performances in which he drew before live audiences.

Inspired by flip books his son Robert brought home, McCay said he "came to see the possibility of making moving pictures" of his cartoons. McCay, then in his early forties, asserted he was "the first man in the world to make animated films", but he was likely familiar with the earlier work of American James Stuart Blackton and the French Émile Cohl. In 1900, Blackton produced The Enchanted Drawing, a trick film in which an artist interacts with a drawing on an easel. Blackton used chalk drawings in 1906 to animate the film Humorous Phases of Funny Faces, and used stop motion techniques to animate a scene in the 1907 film The Haunted Hotel. Cohl's films, such as 1908's Fantasmagorie, were dreamlike nonnarrative pieces in which characters and scenes continually changed shape. Cohl's films were first distributed in the United States in 1909, the year McCay said he first became interested in animation. According to McCay biographer John Canemaker, McCay combined the interactive qualities of Blackton's films with the abstract, shapeshifting qualities of Cohl's into his own films. In the films of all three, the artist interacts with the animation.

=== Little Nemo ===
Considered McCay's masterpiece, Little Nemo in Slumberland debuted in October 1905 as a full-page Sunday strip in the New York Herald. Its child protagonist, whose appearance was based on McCay's son Robert, had fabulous dreams that would be interrupted with his awakening in the last panel. McCay experimented with timing and pacing, the form of the comics page, the size and shape of panels, perspective, and architectural and other details.

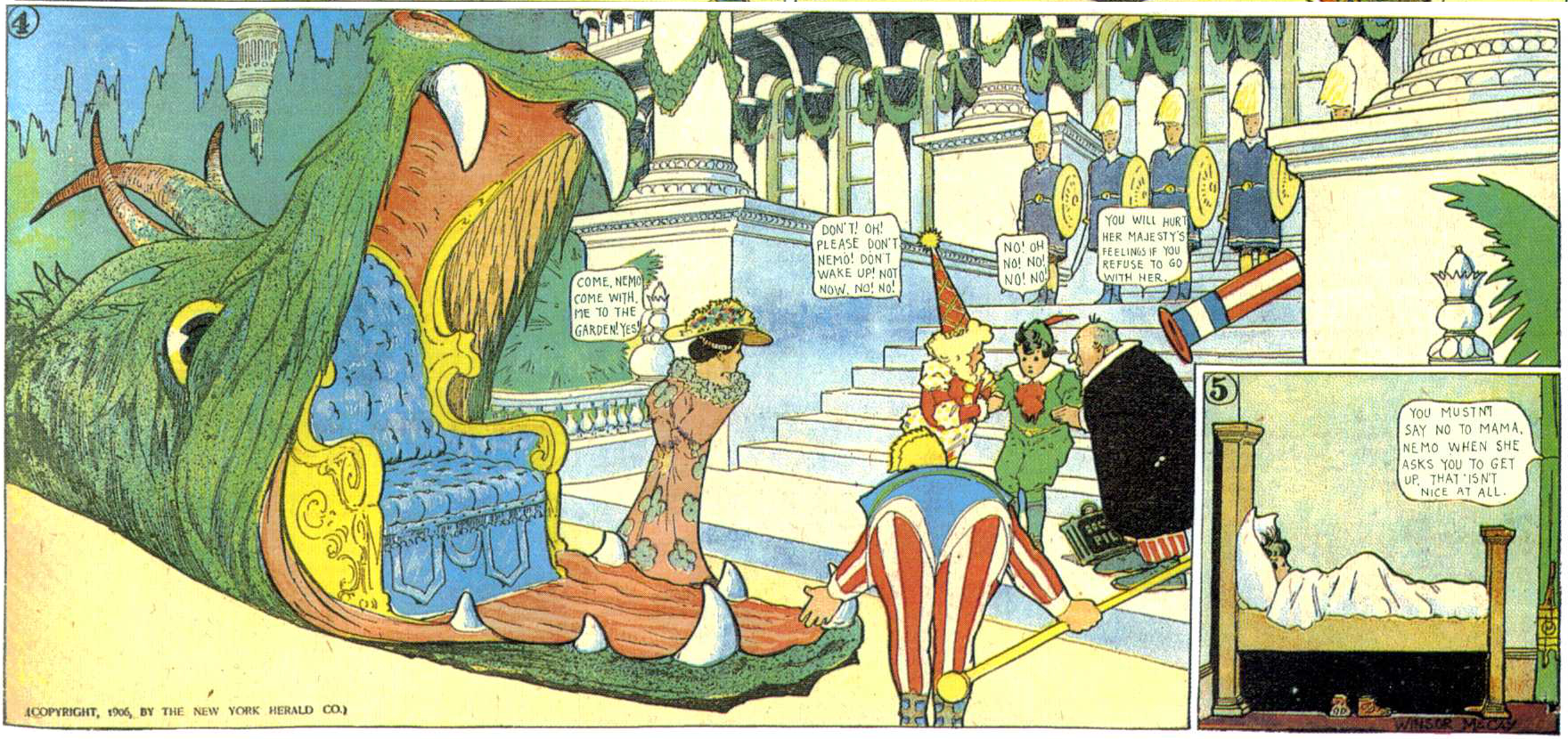
The comic strip Little Nemo in Slumberland is considered McCay's masterpiece (July 22, 1906).

The strip has seen a number of other adaptations. An extravagant $100,000 Little Nemo stage show with score by Victor Herbert and lyrics by Harry B. Smith played to sold-out audiences in 1907. A joint American-Japanese feature-length film Little Nemo: Adventures in Slumberland appeared in 1989, with contributions by Ray Bradbury, Chris Columbus, and Moebius. Little Nemo: The Dream Master was a 1990 side-scrolling platform video game adaptation of the 1989 film.

== Synopsis ==
Following credits proclaiming McCay as "The Famous Cartoonist of the New York Herald" and "the first artist to attempt drawing pictures that will move", McCay sits in a restaurant with a group of colleagues, cartoonist George McManus, actor John Bunny, publisher Eugene V. Brewster and Maurice Costello among them. McCay bets the group that in one month he can make 4000 drawings move. The group laughs and gestures that he is drunk or crazy. McCay sets to work in a studio where he directs workers to move around bundles of paper and barrels of ink. A month later, McCay gathers his colleagues in front of a film projector. McCay rapidly sketches characters from the cast of his Little Nemo comic strip.

Little Nemo (1911)

McCay places a drawing of the character Flip in a wooden slot in front of the camera. The words "Watch me move" appear above Flip's head, and he begins to make gestures while smoking his cigar. Blocks fall from the sky and assemble themselves into the character Impie, and the pair's figures distort, disappear, and reappear before a fantastically dressed Little Nemo magically materializes. Nemo prevents the two others from fighting and takes control of their forms—he stretches and squashes them with the raising and lowering of his arms. Nemo then draws the Princess and brings her to animated life. He gives her a rose which has suddenly grown nearby, just as a gigantic dragon appears. The pair seat themselves on a throne in the dragon's mouth and wave to the audience as the dragon carries them away.

Flip and Impie attempt to follow the dragon in a jalopy, but the car explodes and sends them into the air. Doctor Pill arrives to help, but cannot find anyone until Flip and Impie land on him. The pair try to help the doctor to his feet when the animation freezes. The camera zooms out to reveal the serial number "No. 4000", and a thumb holding the drawing.

== Production ==
By late 1910, McCay had made the 4000 rice-paper drawings for the animated portion of the film. Each was assigned a serial number, and marks were made in the top corners for registration. They were mounted on sheets of cardboard to make them easier to handle and photograph. Before he had them photographed, he tested them on a hand-cranked 24 by 12 by 20 in (61 by 30 by 51 cm) Mutoscope-like machine to ensure the animation was fluid. Photography was done at the Vitagraph Studios under the supervision of Blackton. The animated portion took up about four minutes of the film's total length. In only one sequence did McCay use an animation loop for a repeated action: he re-used a series of seven drawings six times (three forward, three back) to have Flip move his cigar up and down in his mouth three times. McCay made more extensive use of this technique in his later films.

== Style ==
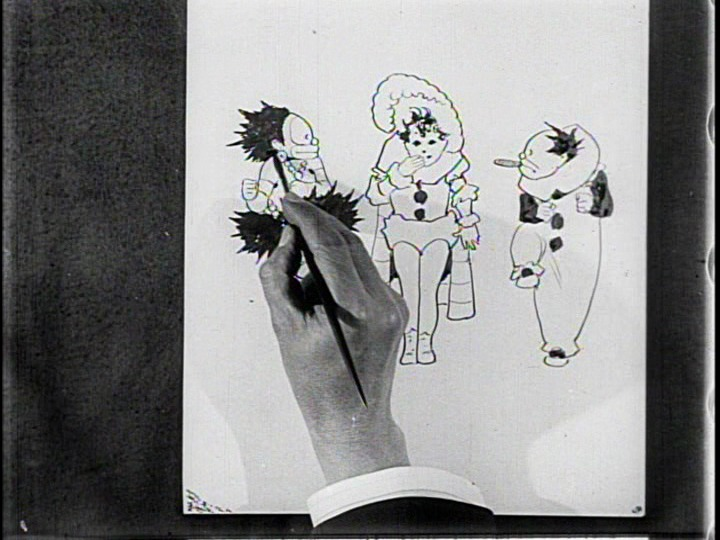
Winsor McCay sketches three of his Little Nemo characters: Impie, Nemo, and Flip.

McCay's drawings are in the heavily outlined Art Nouveau style familiar to the readers of his comics. Its expressive character animation differentiated Little Nemo from the films of Blackton and Cohl. There are no backgrounds; McCay's first film with backgrounds was 1914's Gertie the Dinosaur. McCay demonstrated his mastery of linear perspective in scenes such as when the dragon disappears smoothly into the distance.

The film's positive reception motivated McCay to hand-color each of the 35mm frames of the originally black-and-white film. The dragon chariot that carries off Nemo and the Princess originally appeared in three episodes of Little Nemo in Slumberland in mid-1906.

== Reception and legacy ==
Distributed by Vitagraph, the film debuted in theaters on April 8, 1911. McCay included the film as part of his vaudeville act beginning April 12. Little Nemo was popular with audiences and earned positive reviews. Film magazine The Moving Picture World called Nemo "an admirable piece of work". The Morning Telegraph called McCay's new film-enhanced act "even a greater go than his previous one", and put McCay on its "Blue List" of vaudeville "Actors and Acts of the Highest Ratings". In 1938 architect Claude Bragdon reminisced of the excitement he felt when he saw Little Nemo, saying he "had witnessed the birth of a new art". Nemo appeared on stage and in theaters within the same week, but McCay postponed the theatrical releases of his next two films, How a Mosquito Operates (1912) and Gertie the Dinosaur (1914), for some time after he used them in his stage show.

Animation historian Giannalberto Bendazzi saw the transforming series of images in the plotless Nemo serving as little more than a demonstration of the animation medium's capabilities. Bendazzi wrote that McCay overcame this overt experimentalism in How a Mosquito Operates.

McCay's working method was laborious, and animators developed a number of methods to reduce the workload and speed production to meet the demand for animated films. Within a few years of Nemo's release, Canadian Raoul Barré's registration pegs combined with American Earl Hurd's cel technology became near-universal methods in animation studios. In 1916, McCay himself adopted the cel method, beginning with his fourth film The Sinking of the Lusitania (1918).

In 2009, Little Nemo was selected for preservation in the United States National Film Registry by the Library of Congress as being "culturally, historically, or aesthetically significant".

== See also ==
- Animation in the United States during the silent era
- Pauvre Pierrot (1894)
