= Winsor McCay =

American cartoonist and animator (c.1866–1934)

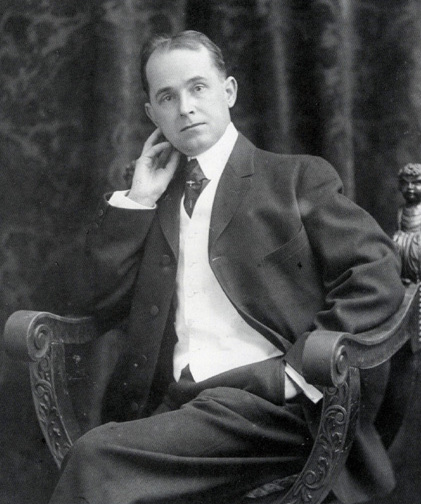
- McCay in 1906
- Born: Zenas Winsor McKay c. 1866-1871; Spring Lake, Michigan, US; or Canada (disputed)
- Died: July 26, 1934 (aged 63–68); New York City, US
- Resting place: Cemetery of the Evergreens, Brooklyn, New York; 40°41′2.0″N 73°54′4.3″W
- Occupations: Animator; cartoonist
- Notable work: Gertie the Dinosaur; Little Nemo
- Spouse: Maude Leonore Dufour (m. 1891)
- Children: 2, including Bob

Zenas Winsor McCay (c. September 26, 1869 – July 26, 1934) was an American cartoonist and animator. He is best known for the comic strip Little Nemo (1905–1914; 1924–1927) and the animated film Gertie the Dinosaur (1914). For contractual reasons, he worked under the pen name Silas on the comic strip Dream of the Rarebit Fiend.

From a young age, McCay was a quick, prolific, and technically dextrous artist. He started his professional career making posters and performing for dime museums, and in 1898 began illustrating newspapers and magazines. In 1903 he joined the New York Herald, where he created popular comic strips such as Little Sammy Sneeze and Dream of the Rarebit Fiend. In 1905, his signature strip Little Nemo in Slumberland debuted—a fantasy strip in an Art Nouveau style about a young boy and his adventurous dreams. The strip demonstrated McCay's strong graphic sense and mastery of color and linear perspective. McCay experimented with the formal elements of the comic strip page, arranging and sizing panels to increase impact and enhance the narrative. McCay also produced numerous detailed editorial cartoons and was a popular performer of chalk talks on the vaudeville circuit.

McCay was an early animation pioneer; between 1911 and 1921, he self-financed and animated ten films, some of which survive only as fragments. The first three served in his vaudeville act; Gertie the Dinosaur was an interactive routine in which McCay appeared to give orders to a trained dinosaur. McCay and his assistants worked for twenty-two months on his most ambitious film, The Sinking of the Lusitania (1918), a patriotic recreation of the German torpedoing in 1915 of the RMS Lusitania. Lusitania did not enjoy as much commercial success as the earlier films, and McCay's later movies attracted little attention. His animation, vaudeville, and comic strip work was gradually curtailed as newspaper magnate William Randolph Hearst, his employer since 1911, expected McCay to devote his energies to editorial illustrations.

In his drawing, McCay made bold, prodigious use of linear perspective, particularly in detailed architecture and cityscapes. He textured his editorial cartoons with copious fine hatching, and made color a central element in Little Nemo. His comic strip work has influenced generations of cartoonists and illustrators. The technical level of McCay's animation—its naturalism, smoothness, and scale—was unmatched until the work of Fleischer Studios in the late 1920s, followed by Walt Disney's feature films in the 1930s. He pioneered inbetweening, the use of registration marks, cycling, and other animation techniques that were to become standard.

== Personal history ==
=== Family history ===
McCay's paternal grandparents, farmers Donald and Christiana McKay, immigrated from Scotland to Upper Canada (Note: Upper Canada became the southern portion of the Canadian province of Ontario upon Canadian Confederation in 1867.) in the mid-1830s. McCay's father, Robert McKay (1840 – March 21, 1915) was born in Woodstock, Upper Canada, the third of six children. McCay's maternal grandparents, Peter and Mary Murray, were also Scottish immigrants, and settled as farmers in East Zorra in Upper Canada. Their daughter Janet was the third of nine children.

Robert was a member of King Solomon's No. 43 Masonic Lodge in Woodstock. In 1862, Robert first traveled to the U.S. Robert and the twenty-five-year-old Janet married on January 8, 1866, at Woodstock's Methodist Episcopal Church. The couple moved across the Canada–United States border later in the year and settled in Spring Lake, Michigan, on the eastern coast of Lake Michigan. Robert was employed by American entrepreneur Zenas G. Winsor (1814–1890), with whom he had made contact in Canada.

Records of McCay's birth are not extant. He stated in an interview in 1910 that he was born in 1869, and this is the year listed on his grave marker. Late in life, he told friends he was born September 26, 1871, in Spring Lake, and they published this information in a magazine. Michigan census records from 1870 and 1880 list a Zenas W. McKay, who was born in Canada in 1867, and others have speculated 1866 or 1868 based on evidence on how the censuses were carried out. No Canadian birth record has been found, and a fire in Spring Lake in May 1893 could have destroyed any American birth record he may have had. His obituary in the New York Herald Tribune stated, "not even Mr. McCay knew his exact age". (Note: Alexander Braun, in discussing the conflicting evidence, comes to the following conclusion: "The most reliable source on the child's birth, due to its chronological proximity, is the McCay family Bible, the entry in which was quoted directly by O'Glasain. Unmistakably written there are the words, "September 26, 1869—God blessed the union of Robert and Janet (of the clan Murray) McCay this morning with an eight pound son. He shall be named after our dear friend, Winsor Zenis [sic].")

The McCays had two more children: Arthur in 1868, and Mae in 1876. Both were born in Michigan. Robert worked as a teamster under Winsor, and by May 1870 had saved enough money to buy a parcel of land. From 1879 to 1881, he worked as a retail grocer. In 1885 he moved the family to Stanton, Michigan, and expanded his land holdings; he was successful in real estate with his brother Hugh, who moved from Canada in 1887.

By 1905, Robert was also a notary public. He had settled in Edmore, Michigan, and by this point had changed the spelling of his surname from "McKay" to "McCay". His son related this story about the change:

Three Scotsmen of the clan McKay were looking for a fourth member to fight four members of the Irish clan Magee ... 'I'm not one of you', my father pointed out. 'You see, I'm one of the clan M-c-C-A-Y.' And that is how I got both my name and my sense of humor.

— Winsor McCay

=== Early life ===
I just couldn't stop drawing anything and everything.

— Winsor McCay

McCay came to be known by his middle name, Winsor. His drawing skills emerged early. According to a story told within the family, McCay made his first drawing in the aftermath of one of the many fires that hit Spring Lake: he picked up a nail and etched the scene of the fire in the frost of a windowpane. Drawing became obsessive for him; he drew anything he saw, and the level of detail and accuracy in his drawing was noted at a young age. He was able to draw accurately from memory even things he had never before drawn—what McCay called "memory sketching". His father thought little of his son's artistic talents, though, and had him sent to Cleary Business College in Ypsilanti, Michigan. McCay rarely attended classes. He bragged about how he would catch the train to Detroit to show off his drawing skills at the Wonderland and Eden Musee dime museum. He drew portraits there for 25¢ apiece, of which he kept half.

McCay thrived on the attention he received, and his talents soon drew wider attention. John Goodison, a geography and drawing professor at Michigan State Normal School, offered to teach art to McCay privately, and McCay eagerly accepted. The lessons were practical and focused on using observation to learn to draw in geometrical perspective. Goodison, a former glass stainer, influenced McCay's use of color. McCay learned how to draw quickly using drills on a blackboard, and gained an appreciation for master artists of the past.

=== Early career (1889–1903) ===
McCay spent two years in Chicago after making his way there sometime in 1889 with his friend Mort Touvers. He traded art techniques there with painter Jules Guérin, whom he met at a boarding house in which he lodged, and did artwork for posters and pamphlets at the National Printing and Engraving Company.

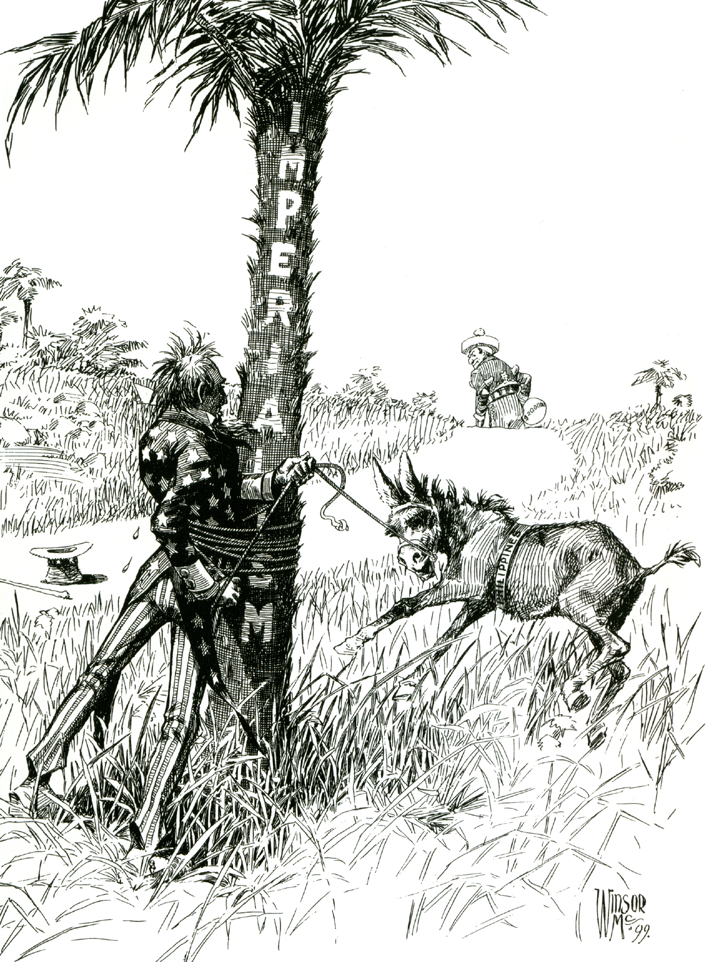
McCay did editorial cartoons early in his career (1899).

In 1891, McCay moved to Cincinnati, where he did more dime museum work while living in a boarding house near his workplace. He spent nine years making posters and other advertisements for the Kohl & Middleton Dime Museum, (Note: The Kohl & Middleton Dime Museum was previously called the Vine Street Dime Museum.) and later Heck and Avery's Family Theater (1896), Avery's New Dime Museum (1898), and Will S. Heck's Wonder World and Theater (1899) on Vine Street. At the museum in 1896, a demonstration of Thomas Edison's Vitascope was given, which was likely McCay's first exposure to the young medium of film. He also did work during this time for Ph. Morton's printing and lithography company. McCay's ability to draw quickly with great accuracy drew crowds when he painted advertisements in public.

His first year at Kohl & Middleton, McCay was smitten when Maude Leonore Dufour walked into the dime museum with her sister while he was painting. He rushed to his studio to change into a custom-tailored suit, returned, and introduced himself to the fourteen-year-old Maude. Soon they eloped in Covington, Kentucky.

McCay began working on the side for the Cincinnati Commercial Tribune, where he learned to draw with a dip pen under the tutelage of Commercial Tribune art room manager Joseph Alexander. In 1898, he accepted a full-time position there. His many illustrations for the paper displayed his bold use of perspective and mastery of hatchwork. Soon after, he began freelancing for the humor magazine Life as well.

In 1900, McCay accepted a position with a higher salary at The Cincinnati Enquirer. There, he produced a prolific number of drawings, did some reporting, and became head of the art department. In his drawings, he began using line thickness to indicate depth, and used thick lines to surround his characters in an Art Nouveau-inspired style that became a trademark of his work.

=== Comic strips (1903–1911) ===
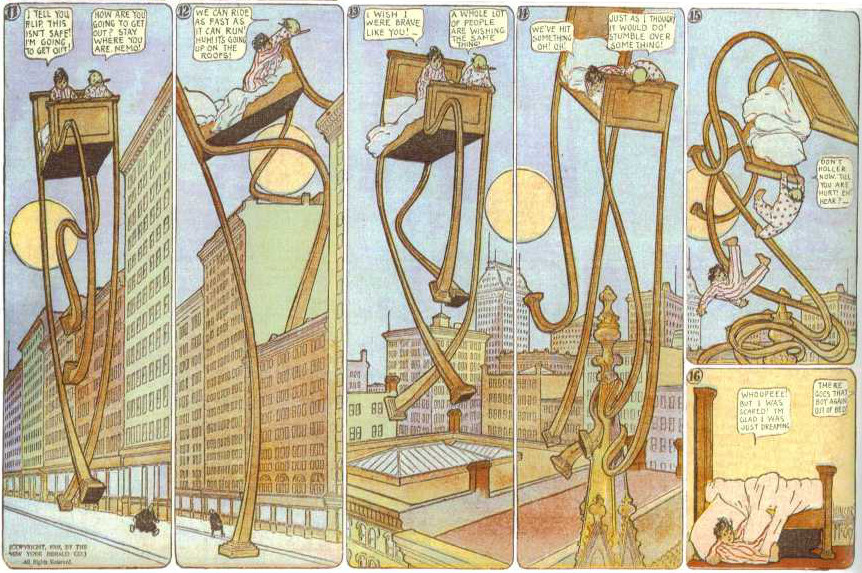
Nemo's bed takes a walk in the July 26, 1908 episode of Little Nemo in Slumberland.

From January until November 1903, McCay drew an ongoing proto-comic strip for the Enquirer based on poems written by George Randolph Chester called A Tale of the Jungle Imps by Felix Fiddle. Before the last two installments appeared in print, McCay had moved to New York City to work for James Gordon Bennett, Jr.'s New York Herald, at first doing illustrations and editorial cartoons. He worked alongside comic strip pioneer Richard F. Outcault, who was doing the Buster Brown strip at the Herald. A rivalry built up between the two cartoonists which resulted in Outcault leaving the Herald to return to his previous employer, William Randolph Hearst at The New York Journal.

McCay's first continuing comic strip, Mr. Goodenough, debuted in the New York Evening Telegram on January 21, 1904. The formula for the strip was that a sedentary millionaire would seek ways to become more active, with embarrassing results. Sister's Little Sister's Beau, McCay's first strip with a child protagonist, lasted one installment that April, and his first color strip, Phurious Phinish of Phoolish Philipe's Phunny Phrolics, appeared in the Herald's Sunday supplement that May.

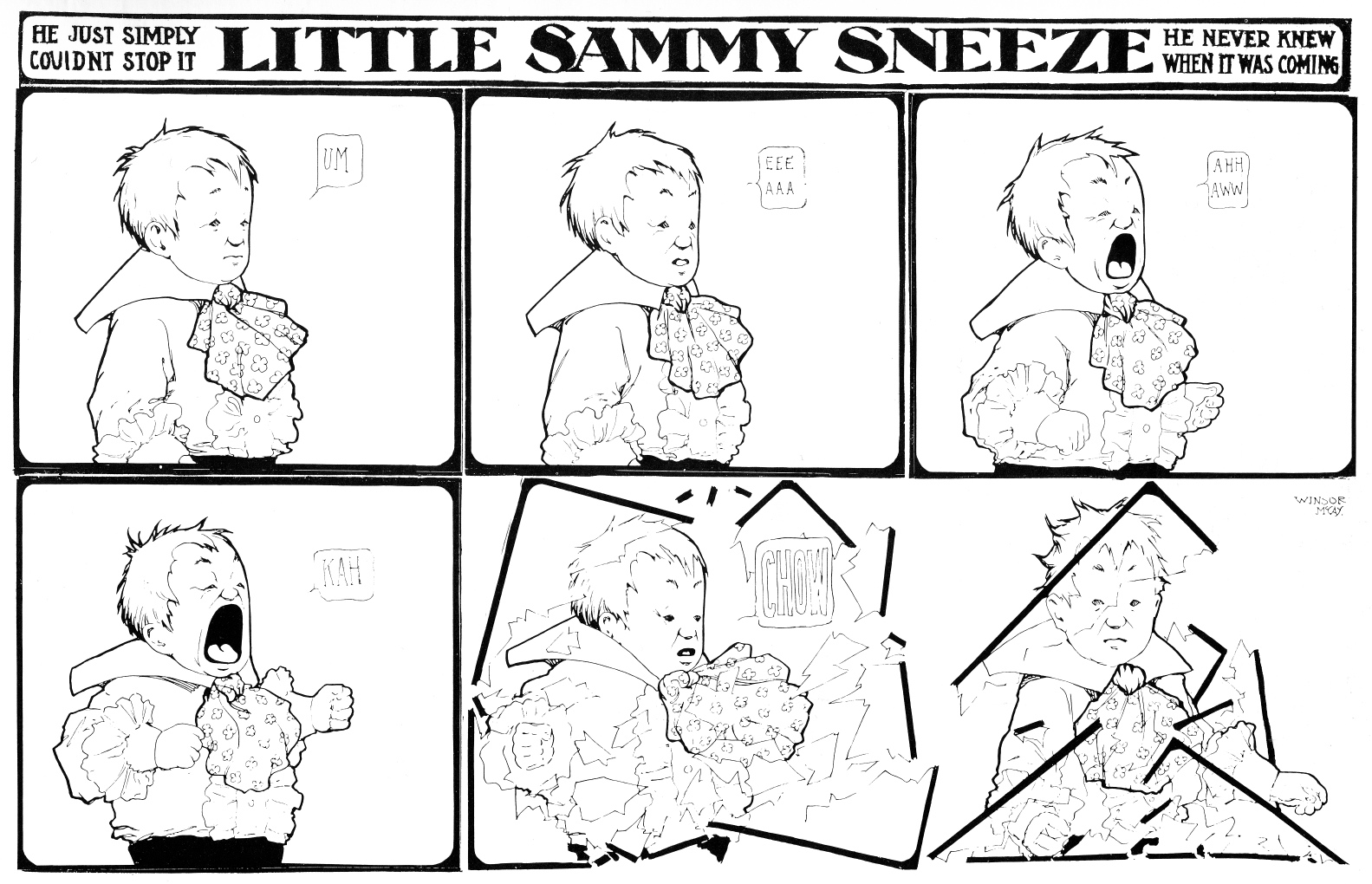
Little Sammy Sneeze, September 24, 1905

McCay's first popular comic strip was Little Sammy Sneeze. The strip starred a young boy whose sneeze would build panel by panel until it was released, with explosively disastrous results, for which he was usually punished or chased away by those affected. The strip debuted in July 1904 and ran until December 1906.

McCay's longest-running strip, Dream of the Rarebit Fiend, first appeared in The Evening Telegram in September 1904. The strip was aimed at an adult audience, and had no recurring characters. The characters that appeared in the strip would have fantastic, sometimes terrifying dreams, only to wake up in the last panel, cursing the Welsh rarebit they had eaten the night before, which they blamed for bringing on the dream. Rarebit Fiend was so popular that a book collection appeared in 1905 from publisher Frederick A. Stokes. It was adapted to film by Edwin S. Porter, and plans were made for a "comic opera or musical extravaganza" for stage that failed to materialize. McCay signed the Rarebit Fiend strips with the pen name "Silas", as his contract required that he not use his real name for Evening Telegram work.

The McCays had been living in Manhattan, close to the Herald offices; before 1905 they moved to Sheepshead Bay in Brooklyn, New York, a seaside resort on Long Island. It was an hour commute from the Herald offices, but they believed it to be a better place to raise children. They lived at a number of addresses before settling into a three-story house at 1901 Voorhies Avenue, where McCay resided for the rest of his life. As his reputation grew, his employers allowed him to work from his home studio more often.

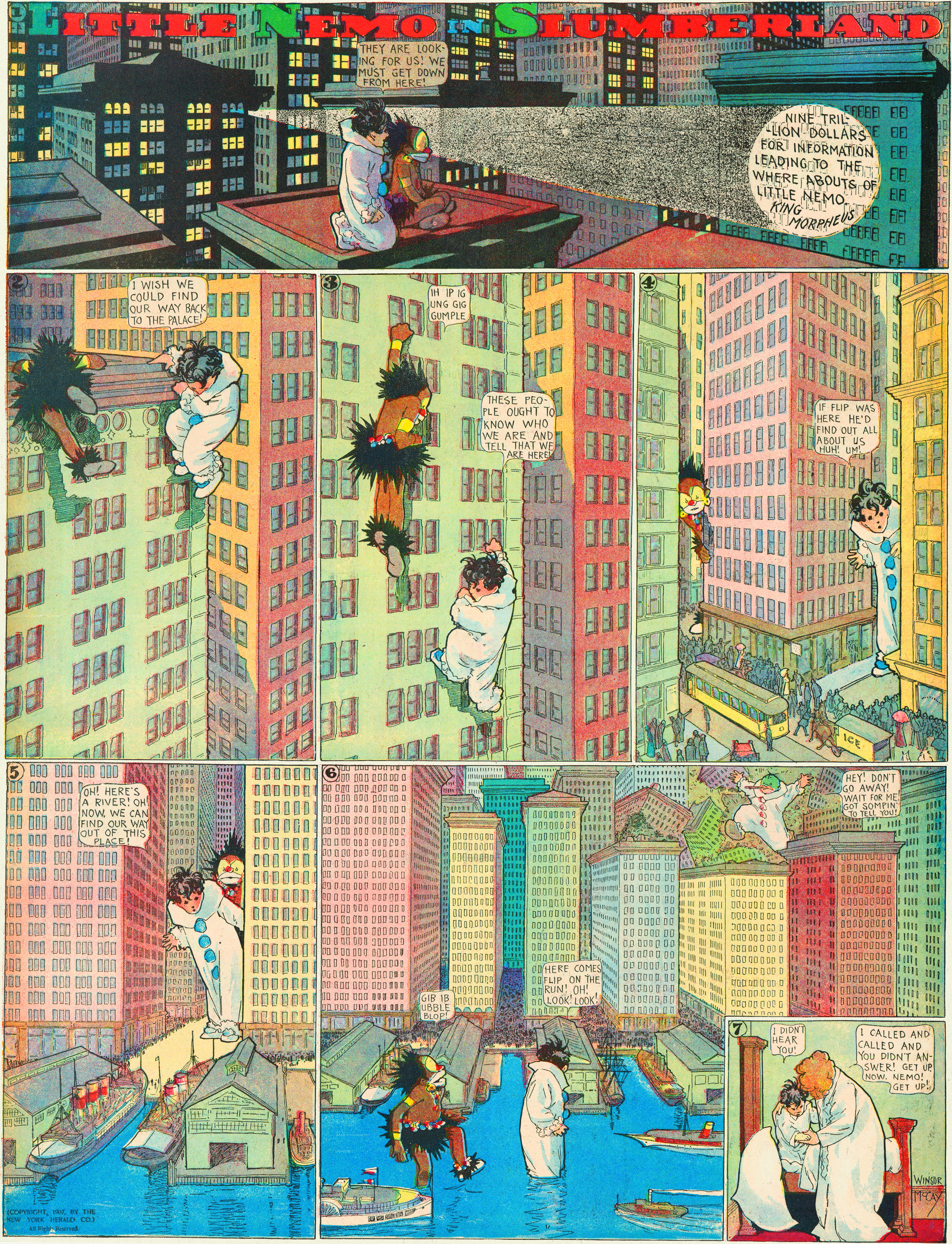
The most successful of McCay's comic strips was Little Nemo September 9, 1907

While still turning out illustrations and editorial cartoons daily, McCay began three more continuing strips in 1905. In January, he began The Story of Hungry Henrietta, in which the child protagonist visibly ages week by week, and eats compulsively in lieu of the love she craves from her parents. A Pilgrim's Progress by Mister Bunion was another "Silas" strip for The Evening Telegram, which ran from June 1905 until May 1909. Mr. Bunion spent each strip unsuccessfully scheming to rid himself of his suitcase, labeled "Dull Care".

McCay got "an idea from the Rarebit Fiend to please the little folk", and in October 1905 the full-page Sunday strip Little Nemo in Slumberland debuted in the Herald. Considered McCay's masterpiece, its child protagonist had fabulous dreams, interrupted each week with his awakening in the final panel. Nemo's appearance was based on McCay's son Robert. McCay experimented with formal aspects of the comics page: he made inventive use of timing and pacing, the size and shape of panels, perspective, and architectural and other details. The Herald was considered to have the highest quality color printing of any newspaper at the time; its printing staff used the Ben Day process for color, and McCay annotated the Nemo pages with precise color schemes for the printers.

Impresario F. F. Proctor approached McCay in April 1906 to perform chalk talks for the vaudeville circuit. For $500 per week he was to draw twenty-five sketches in fifteen minutes before live audiences, as a pit band played a piece called "Dream of the Rarebit Fiend". In his The Seven Ages of Man routine, he drew two faces and progressively aged them. His first performance was on June 11, 1906, in a show that also featured entertainer W. C. Fields. It was a success, and McCay toured with the show throughout 1907, while managing to complete his comic strip and illustration work on time, often working in hotel rooms or backstage.

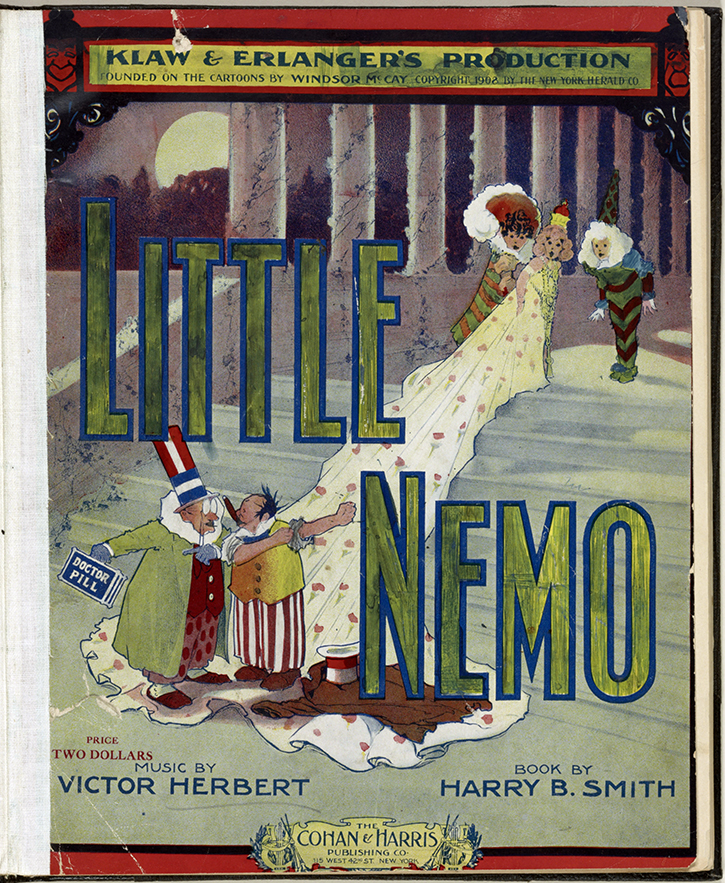
Cover to the score of the extravagantly expensive Little Nemo stage musical, 1908

As early as 1905, several abortive attempts were made to produce a stage version of Little Nemo. In mid-1907, Marcus Klaw and A. L. Erlanger announced they would put on an extravagant Little Nemo show for an unprecedented $100,000, with a score by Victor Herbert and lyrics by Harry B. Smith. It starred Gabriel Weigel as Nemo, Joseph Cawthorn as Dr. Pill, and Billy B. Van as Flip. Reviews were positive; it played to sold-out houses in New York and toured for two seasons. McCay brought his vaudeville act to each city where Little Nemo played. When the Keith circuit (Note: Keith had partnered with Proctor in 1906.) refused McCay to perform in Boston without a new act, McCay switched to the William Morris circuit, with a $100-a-week raise. In several cities, McCay brought his son, who as publicity sat on a small throne dressed as Nemo.

As part of an improvised story, Cawthorn introduced a mythical creature he called a "Whiffenpoof". The word caught on with the public, and became the name of a hit song and a singing group. Despite the show's success, it failed to make back its investment due to its enormous expenses and came to an end in December 1910.

McCay displayed his social awareness in the last strip he created for the Herald, Poor Jake. Its title character was a silent laborer who worked thanklessly for a Colonel and Mrs. Stall, who exploit him. The strip ran from 1909 until spring 1911.

McCay was approached in early 1910 to bring his vaudeville show to Europe. McCay requested the Herald's permission, but the plans never materialized. His show stayed within the Eastern United States until he ceased performing in 1917. Biographer John Canemaker assumed McCay's request to tour Europe was turned down, and that the refusal added to McCay's growing frustration with the Herald. A distrust of big business became pronounced in McCay's work around this time, including a story arc in Little Nemo in which the characters visit a Mars oppressed by a greedy business magnate.

=== Animation (1911–1921) ===
McCay said he was most proud of his animation work. He completed ten animated films between 1911 and 1921, and three more were planned.

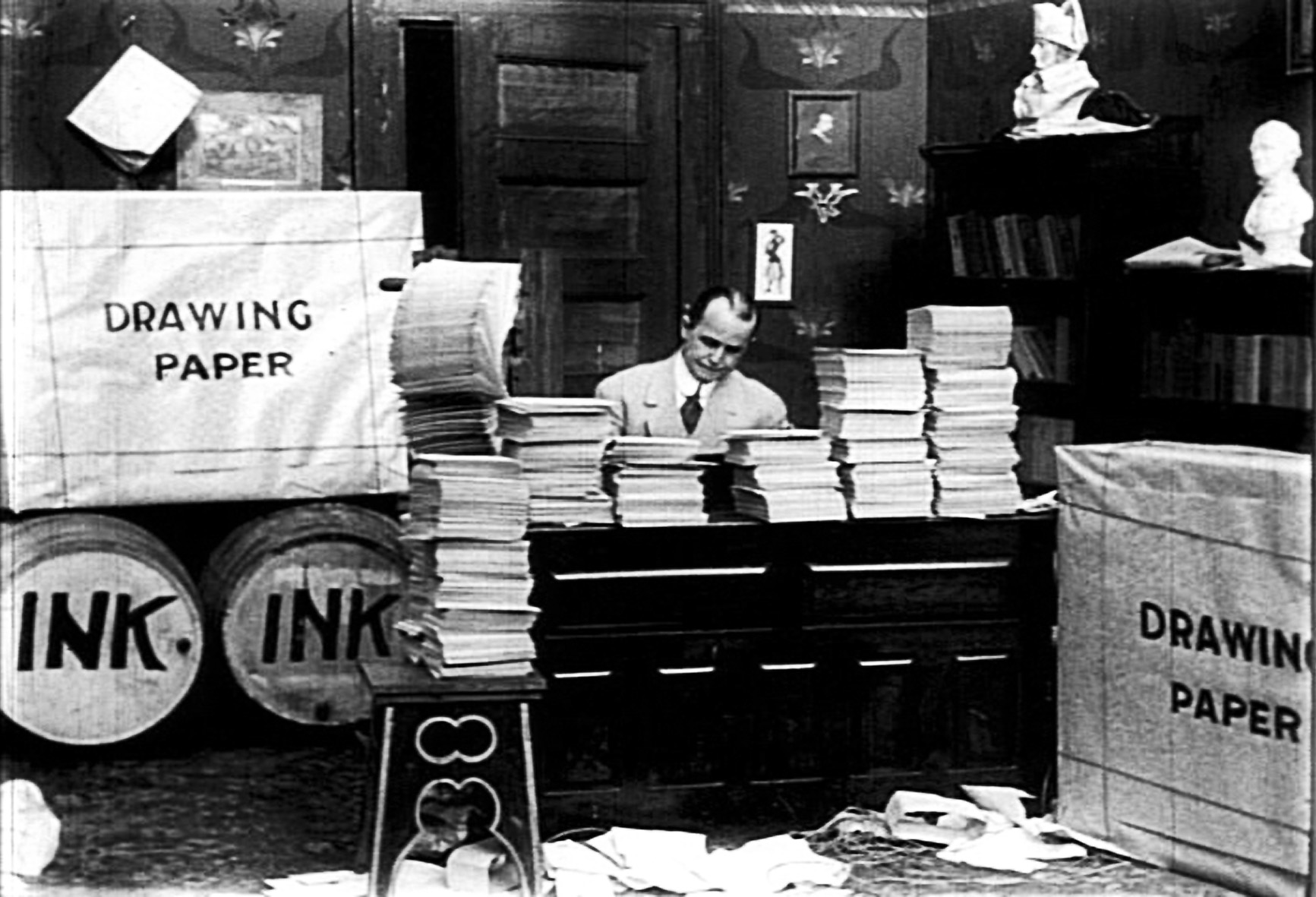
McCay in a scene from his first animated film, Little Nemo (1911)

Inspired by the flip books his son brought home, McCay "came to see the possibility of making moving pictures" of his cartoons. He claimed to be "the first man in the world to make animated cartoons", though he was preceded by others such as James Stuart Blackton and Émile Cohl. McCay made four thousand drawings on mulberry paper for his first animated short, which starred his Little Nemo characters. They were shot at Vitagraph Studios under Blackton's supervision. Live-action sequences were added to the beginning and end of the film, in which McCay bets his newspaper colleagues that in one month he can make four thousand drawings that move. Among those featured in these sequences were cartoonist George McManus and actor John Bunny. Little Nemo debuted in movie theatres on April 8, 1911, and four days later McCay began using it as part of his vaudeville act. Its good reception motivated him to hand-color each of the frames of the originally black-and-white animation.

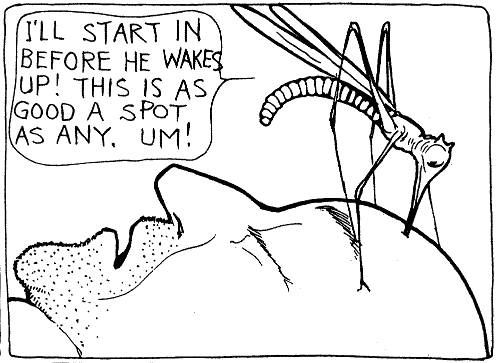
McCay based How a Mosquito Operates (1912) on the June 5, 1909 episode of Dream of the Rarebit Fiend.

McCay had become frustrated with the Herald, partly over money issues and partly because he perceived a lack of freedom. He accepted a higher-paying offer in spring 1911 from Hearst at the New York American and took Little Nemo's characters with him. The Herald held the strip's copyright, but McCay won a lawsuit that allowed him to continue using the characters, which he did under the title In the Land of Wonderful Dreams. The Herald was unsuccessful in finding another cartoonist to continue the original strip.

McCay began work that May on his next animated film, How a Mosquito Operates, based on a Rarebit Fiend episode from June 5, 1909, in which a man in bed tries in vain to defend himself from a giant mosquito, which drinks itself so full that it explodes. The animation is naturalistic—rather than expanding like a balloon, with each sip of blood the mosquito's abdomen swells according to its body structure. The film was completed in January 1912, and McCay toured with it that spring and summer.

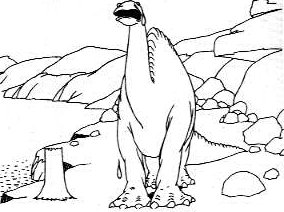
Gertie the Dinosaur (1913) was an interactive part of McCay's vaudeville act.

Gertie the Dinosaur debuted in February 1914 as part of McCay's vaudeville act. McCay introduced Gertie as "the only dinosaur in captivity", and commanded the animated beast with a whip. Gertie seemed to obey McCay, bowing to the audience, and eating a tree and a boulder, though she had a will of her own and sometimes rebelled. When McCay admonished her, she cried. McCay consoled her by throwing her an apple—in reality pocketing the cardboard prop apple as a cartoon one simultaneously appeared on screen. In the finale, McCay walked offstage, reappeared in animated form in the film, and had Gertie carry him away. Producer William Fox's Box Office Attractions obtained distribution rights to a modified version of Gertie that could be played in regular movie theaters. This version was prefaced with a live-action sequence and replaced the interactive portions with intertitles.

Gertie was McCay's first piece of animation with detailed backgrounds. McCay drew the foreground characters, while art student neighbor John A. Fitzsimmons traced the backgrounds. McCay pioneered the "McCay Split System" of inbetweening, in which major poses or positions were drawn first, and the intervening frames drawn after. This relieved tedium and improved the timing of the film's actions. McCay refused to patent his system, and was sued in 1914 by animator John Randolph Bray, who took advantage of McCay's lapse by patenting many of McCay's techniques, including the use of registration marks, tracing paper, the Mutoscope action viewer, and the cycling of drawings to create repetitive action. The lawsuit was unsuccessful, and there is evidence that McCay may have countersued—he thereafter received royalty payments from Bray for licensing the techniques.

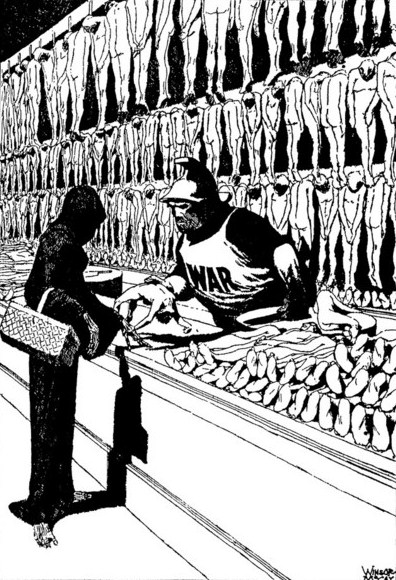
Hearst pressured McCay into giving up his comic strips and non-newspaper work to concentrate on editorial cartoons. "His Best Customer", 1917

Hearst was disappointed with the quality of McCay's newspaper work. Infuriated that he couldn't reach McCay during a vaudeville performance, Hearst pulled from his papers advertising for the theatre where McCay performed. Editor Arthur Brisbane told him that he was "a serious artist, not a comic cartoonist", and that he was to give up his comic strip work to focus on editorial illustrations. Hearst pressured McCay's agents to reduce the number of his vaudeville appearances, and he was induced to sign a contract with Hearst that limited his vaudeville appearances to greater New York, with occasional exceptions. In February 1917, Hearst had McCay give up entirely on vaudeville and all other paid work outside the Hearst empire, though he was occasionally granted permission for particular shows. Hearst increased McCay's salary to cover the loss of income.

McCay was expected to report daily to the American building, where he shared a ninth-floor office with humorist Arthur "Bugs" Baer and sports cartoonist Joe McGurk. There, he illustrated editorials by Arthur Brisbane, who often sent back McCay's drawings with instructions for changes. The quality of his drawings varied depending on his interest in the subject of the assignment, whether or not he agreed with the sentiments portrayed, and on events in his personal life. For example, in March 1914 he was subjected to a blackmail plot by a Mrs. Lambkin, who was seeking a divorce from her husband. Lambkin alleged that McCay's wife Maude was seeing her husband. With McCay's level of fame, such a story would likely be in the papers, and Mrs. Lambkin and her husband told McCay that she would keep it secret for $1,000. McCay did not believe the allegations, and gave testimony at the Lambkins' divorce trial. The blackmail failed, and the divorce was not granted.

Hearst animation studio International Film Service began in December 1915, and brought Hearst cartoonists to the screen. McCay was initially listed as one of them, but the studio never produced anything either by his hands or featuring his creations. McCay derived satisfaction from doing the work himself. Begun in 1916, The Sinking of the Lusitania was his follow-up to Gertie. The film was not a fantasy but a detailed, realistic recreation of the 1915 German torpedoing of the RMS Lusitania. The event counted 128 Americans among its 1,198 dead, and was a factor leading to the American entry into World War I.

McCay's daughter Marion married military man Raymond T. Moniz, eighteen years her senior, on October 13, 1917. She gave birth to McCay's first grandchild, Ray Winsor Moniz, on July 16, 1918. Moniz and McCay's son Robert were called up for service when the U.S. entered World War I.

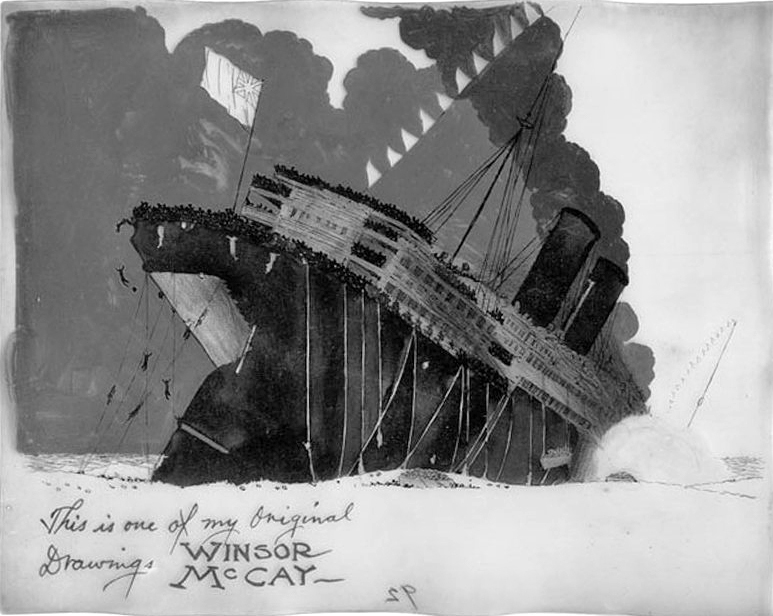
The Sinking of the Lusitania (1918) required 25,000 drawings to be made over two years, and was McCay's first film to use acetate cels.

McCay's self-financed Lusitania took nearly two years to complete. With the assistance of John Fitzsimmons and Cincinnati cartoonist William Apthorp "Ap" Adams, McCay spent his off hours drawing the film on sheets of cellulose acetate (or "cels") with white and black India ink at McCay's home. It was the first film McCay made using cels, a technology animator Earl Hurd had patented in 1914; it saved work by allowing dynamic drawings to be made on one or more layers, which could be laid over a static background layer, relieving animators of the tedium of retracing static images onto drawing after drawing. McCay had the cels photographed at the Vitagraph studios. The film was naturalistically animated, and made use of dramatic camera angles that would have been impossible in a live-action film.

Jewel Productions released the film on July 20, 1918. Advertising touted it as "the picture that will never have a competitor"; the film itself called McCay "the originator and inventor of Animated Cartoons" and drew attention to the fact that it took 25,000 drawings to complete. The Sinking of the Lusitania did not greatly return on McCay's investment—after a few years' run in theaters, it netted $80,000.

McCay continued to produce animated films using cels. By 1921, he had completed six, though three were likely never shown commercially to audiences and have survived only in fragments: The Centaurs, Flip's Circus, and Gertie on Tour. In 1921, he released three films based on Dream of the Rarebit Fiend: Bug Vaudeville, in which insects and other creepy-crawlies perform on stage; The Pet, in which a creature with a bottomless appetite grows enormously and terrorizes the city in a way reminiscent of King Kong; and The Flying House, in which a man attaches wings to his house to flee from debt. McCay's son Robert is credited with the animation on this last film, but Canemaker notes it is highly unlikely that a first-time animator could have produced such an accomplished piece of animation.

=== Later career (1921–1934) ===
After 1921, McCay was made to give up on animation when Hearst learned he devoted more of his time to animation than to his newspaper illustrations. Unexecuted ideas McCay had for animation projects included a collaboration with Jungle Imps author George Randolph Chester, a musical film called The Barnyard Band, and a film about the Americans' role in World War I.

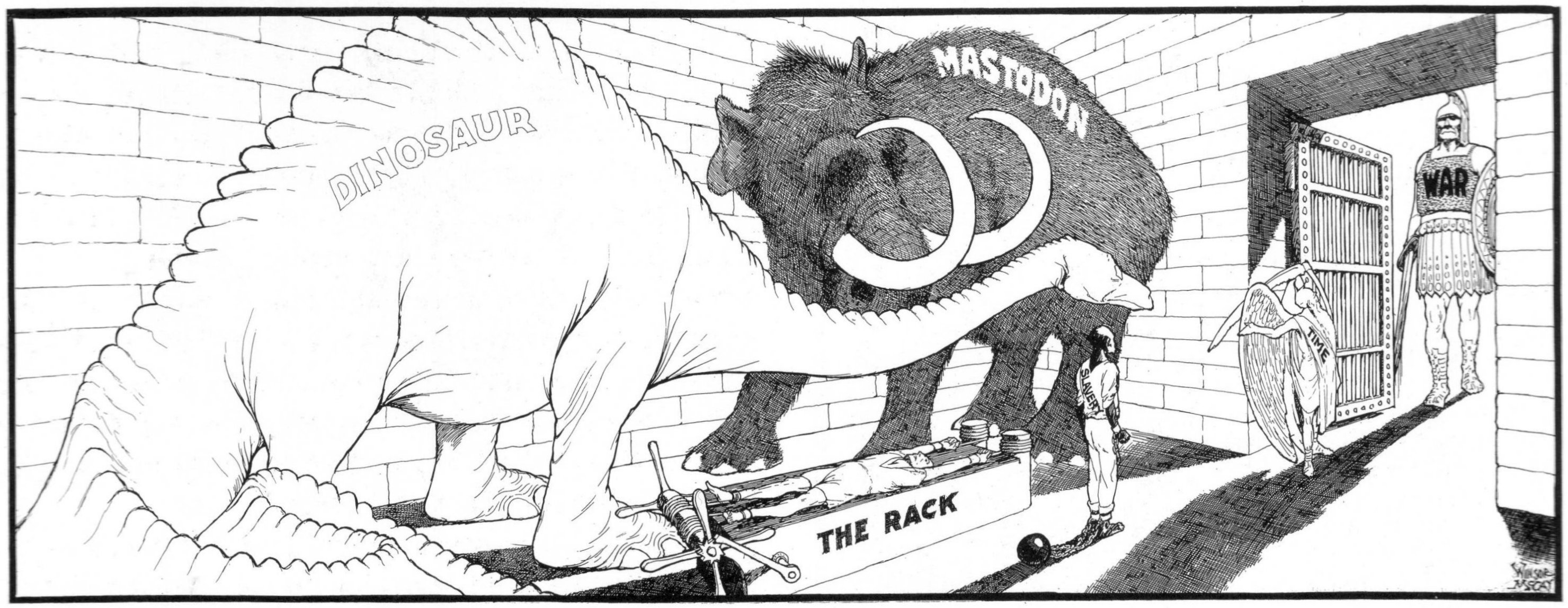
Editorial cartoon "Oblivion's Cave—Step Right In, Please" (March 19, 1922)

McCay's son Robert married Theresa "Tedda" Munchausen on April 9, 1921. McCay bought them a nearby house as a wedding gift. The couple gave McCay two more grandchildren: Janet (named after McCay's mother) in 1922, and Robert in 1928. Robert suffered shell shock during World War I, and following the war had difficulty drawing. McCay tried to boost his son's confidence by finding him cartooning work, and some of the elder McCay's editorial cartoons were signed "Robert Winsor McCay, Jr." Robert also briefly revived the Dreams of the Rarebit Fiend strip as Rabid Reveries starting in 1924.

In 1922, McCay resumed doing vaudeville shows for the Keith circuit. He had a cameo in a newspaper office scene in the boxing film The Great White Way in early 1924.

McCay left Hearst upon the expiration of his contract in May 1924, bitter over not having received a promised $5,000 bonus. He returned to the Herald Tribune, and brought back Little Nemo beginning that August. The new strip displayed the virtuoso technique of the old, but the panels were laid out in an unvarying grid. Nemo took a more passive role in the stories, and there was no continuity. The strip came to an end in December 1926, as it was not popular with readers. Hearst executives had been trying to convince McCay to return to the American, and succeeded in 1927. While McCay was gone, his place had been filled by Mel Cummin, who was let go after McCay's return. Due to the lack of the 1920s Nemo's success, the Herald Tribune signed over all copyrights to the strip to McCay for one dollar.

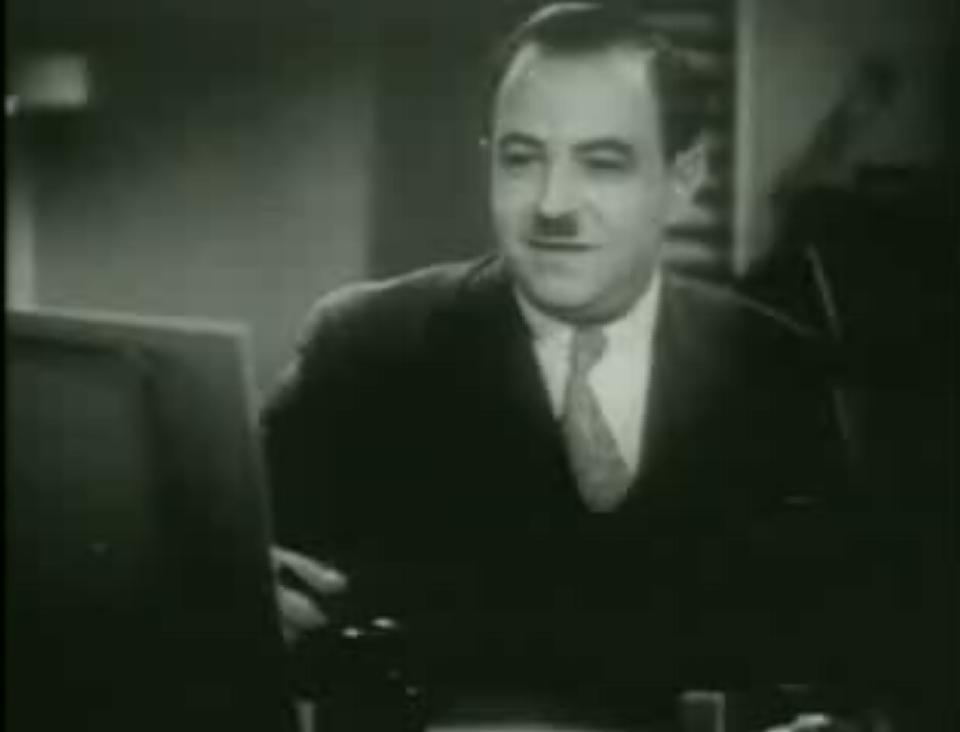
In 1927, McCay expressed his disappointment at the state of the animation industry at a dinner in his honor, where he was introduced by Max Fleischer (pictured).

In 1927, McCay attended a dinner in his honor in New York. After a considerable amount of drinking, McCay was introduced by animator Max Fleischer. McCay gave the gathered group of animators some technical advice, but when he felt the audience was not giving him attention, he berated his audience, saying, "Animation is an art. That is how I conceived it. But as I see, what you fellows have done with it, is making it into a trade. Not an art, but a trade. Bad Luck!" That September he appeared on the radio at WNAC, and on November 2 he was interviewed by Frank Craven for The Evening Journal's Woman's Hour. During both appearances he complained about the state of contemporary animation.

An executive of the American Tobacco Company approached McCay in 1929 to do an advertising campaign for a financial "sum in excess of his annual salary". Brisbane refused, noting that McCay's contract didn't allow outside work. When the executive stormed into Brisbane's office threatening to pull American Tobacco's advertising dollars from the American, Brisbane provided a written release for the work.

In 1932, McCay found himself in what he recalled as "the wildest ride" in his life when Hearst's son "Young Bill" drove him at 85 miles per hour (137 km/h) to the scene of the kidnapping of the Lindbergh baby. They arrived there two hours after the crime was first reported to police, and were able to interview the gathered police before the grounds were closed off to the public. McCay sketched the scene, the staff, and the ladders the kidnappers used, which he was allowed to see up close.

=== Death ===
McCay enjoyed robust health most of his life. On July 26, 1934, he complained to his wife of a severe head-ache. To his horror, he found his right arm—his drawing arm—was paralyzed. He lost consciousness and was pronounced dead later that afternoon, with his wife, children, and son-in-law by his side. He had died of a cerebral embolism, and was buried at the Cemetery of the Evergreens in Brooklyn in a family plot. He had a Masonic funeral in his home, attended by his newspaper colleagues, Hearst and his son, and the Society of Illustrators, among others.

Brisbane hired back Mel Cummin to replace McCay. Due to his lavish life-style, McCay left a smaller fortune than those around him had expected. By the early 1940s, Maude had used up her inheritance and sold the house on Voorhies Avenue. When she died of a heart attack on March 2, 1949, she was living with her daughter and son-in-law. Son Robert was also careless with his inheritance, and less successful in art than his father. He worked for a short time at the Hearst papers, and tried unsuccessfully to get a job at the Disney studios, before finding a career as illustrator for Training Aids/Special Services at Fort Ord.

== Personal life ==
Self-conscious and introverted in private, McCay was nevertheless a charismatic showman and self-promoter, and maintained several lifelong friendships. McCay was a light but frequent drinker; he drank for camaraderie rather than for a love of drinking. To his wife's chagrin, McCay was a smoker of cigars and cigarettes. He was self-taught at the piano, and was an avid reader of poetry, plays and novels; he admired W. B. Yeats, knew the works of Percy Bysshe Shelley and John Keats, and could quote the Bible and Shakespeare.

McCay stood barely five feet (150 cm) tall, and felt dominated by his wife, who was nearly as tall as he was. McCay married Maude Leonore Dufour, the youngest of three daughters of French-Canadian carriage painter John Dufour. About a decade separated the couple's ages: Maude was 14 when they married. Biographer Canemaker speculates this may explain the lack of certainty behind McCay's birthdate, even by McCay himself, as he may have claimed to be younger than he was to justify marrying a teenaged girl. Maude was also age-conscious: she preferred her grandchildren to call her "Nan" instead of "Grandma" and dyed her hair as she got older. The McCays took on the traditional roles of a married couple of the time, in that Winsor was the breadwinner and Maude the homemaker. Neither spouse got along well with the other's mother.

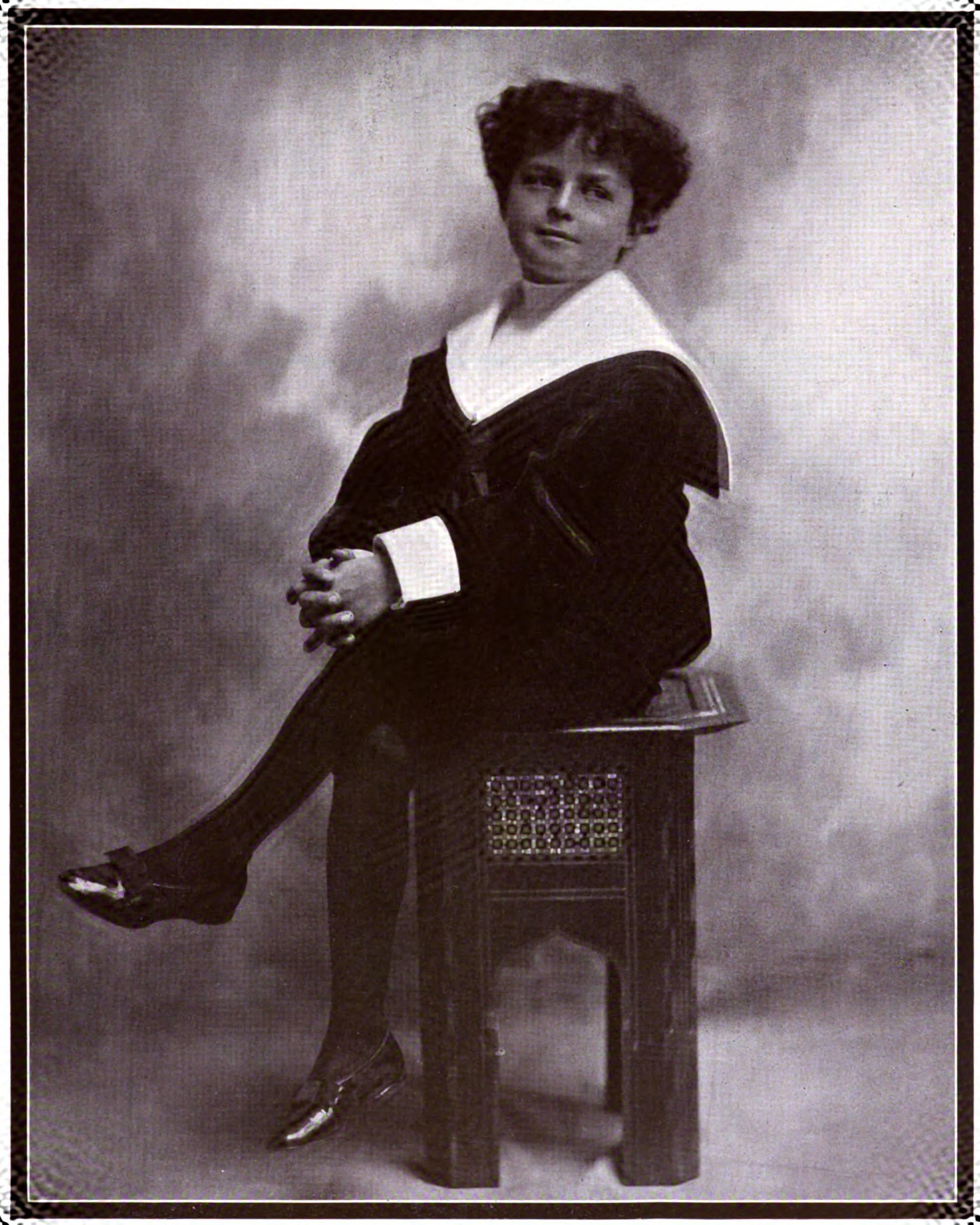
McCay's son Robert, posing as Little Nemo in 1908

The couple had two children: Robert Winsor, born June 21, 1896; and Marion Elizabeth, born August 22, 1897. McCay was said to be easy-going with the children, and left discipline to their stern mother. Marion felt domineered by her mother and perceived that her brother was her mother's favorite; she was closer to her father and often appeared in public with him. Robert looked up to his father and became an artist himself. He was proud to have served as the model for Little Nemo.

The McCays lived lavishly. McCay disliked driving, so he kept a chauffeur who also served as a bodyguard, as the editorial cartoons McCay drew for Hearst sometimes attracted threatening letters. Maude made daily trips by limousine to shop in upscale downtown Brooklyn with other well-to-do wives. Maude often complained to her husband, but he refused to discuss matters with her.

McCay's politics are unclear, and it is disputed whether he sympathized with the views displayed in his editorial cartoons. He was agnostic and believed in reincarnation. He was a Freemason, whose ranks he may have joined as early as when he was living in Chicago. His father had also been a Freemason, and was buried in 1915 with full Masonic rites, with funerals arranged by his Masonic lodges in both Woodstock, Ontario, and Edmore, Michigan. His mother often visited him in Brooklyn, and attended Little Nemo's Philadelphia premiere. She died in Edmore, Michigan, in 1927.

McCay's brother Arthur was placed in a mental hospital in Traverse City, Michigan on March 7, 1898, where he stayed until his death from bronchopneumonia and arteriosclerosis on June 15, 1946. He never received family visits. McCay never let his children know about his brother, nor did they know about the existence of his sister Mae, who died in 1910.

== Legacy ==
It is as though the first creature to emerge from the primeval slime was Albert Einstein; and the second was an amoeba, because after McCay's animation it took his followers nearly twenty years to find out how he did it. The two most important people in animation are Winsor McCay and Walt Disney, and I'm not sure which should go first.

— Animator Chuck Jones

In 1937, McCay's son Robert attempted to carry on his father's legacy by reviving Little Nemo. Comic book packager Harry "A" Chesler's syndicate announced a Sunday and daily Nemo strip, credited to "Winsor McCay Jr." Robert also drew a comic book version for Chesler called Nemo in Adventureland starring grown-up versions of Nemo and the Princess. Neither project lasted long. In 1947, Robert and fabric salesman Irving Mendelsohn organized the McCay Feature Syndicate, Inc. to revive the original Nemo strip from McCay's original art, modified to fit the size of modern newspaper pages. This revival also did not last.

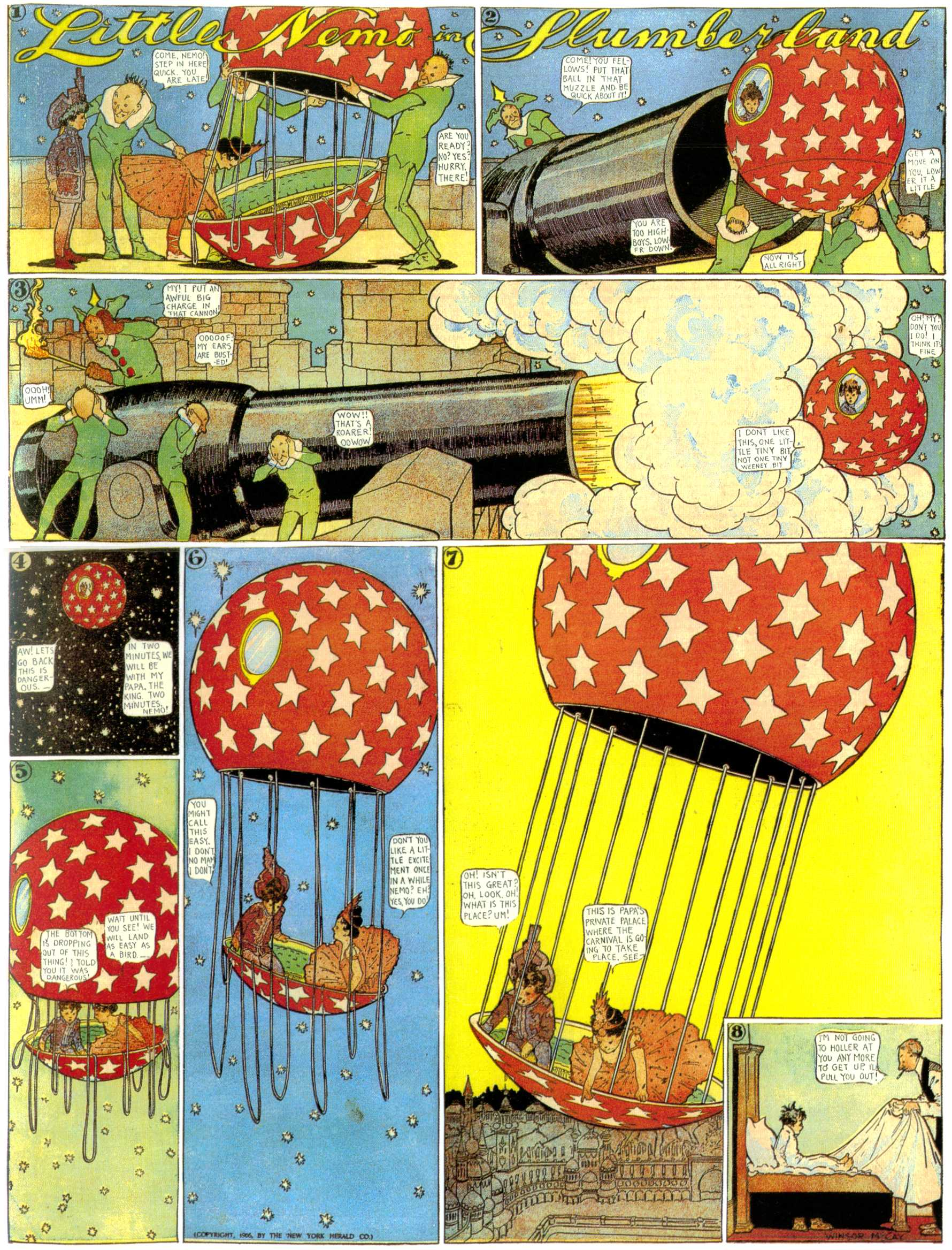

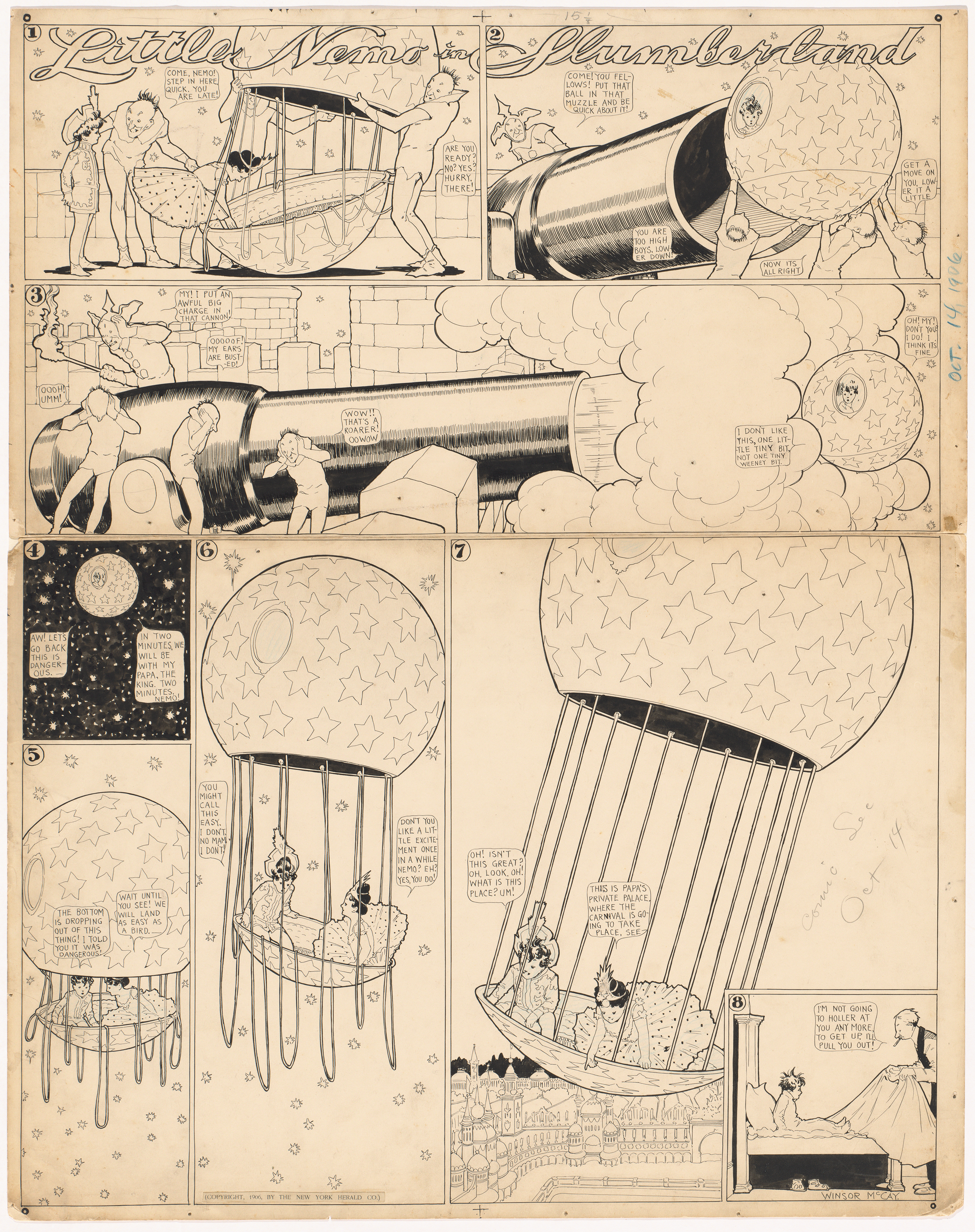
McCay's drawing for the Little Nemo strip running October 14, 1906, is in the collection of the National Gallery of Art.

McCay's original artwork has been poorly preserved. McCay insisted on having his originals returned to him, and a large collection that survived him was destroyed in a fire in the late 1930s. His wife was unsure how to handle the surviving pieces, so his son took on the responsibility and moved the collection to his own house. The family sold off some of the artwork when they were in need of cash. Responsibility for it passed to Mendelsohn, then later to daughter Marion. By the early twenty-first century, most of McCay's surviving artwork remained in family hands.

McCay destroyed many of his original cans of film to create more storage space. Of what film he kept, much has not survived, as it was photographed on 35mm nitrate film, which decomposes and is highly flammable. Mendelsohn's son and a friend, both young animators, discovered the film in Mendelsohn's possession in 1947 and rescued what they could. In some cases, such as The Centaurs, only fragments could be saved. A negative and incomplete positive was discovered of Performing Animals, a film of animals playing instruments that may have been intended for McCay's vaudeville act; it was deemed unsalvageable and destroyed.

In 1966, cartoonist Woody Gelman discovered the original artwork for many Little Nemo strips at a cartoon studio where McCay's son Robert had worked. Many of the recovered originals were displayed at the Metropolitan Museum of Art under the direction of curator A. Hyatt Mayor. In 1973, Gelman published a collection of Little Nemo strips in Italy. His collection of McCay originals is preserved at the Billy Ireland Cartoon Library & Museum at Ohio State University.

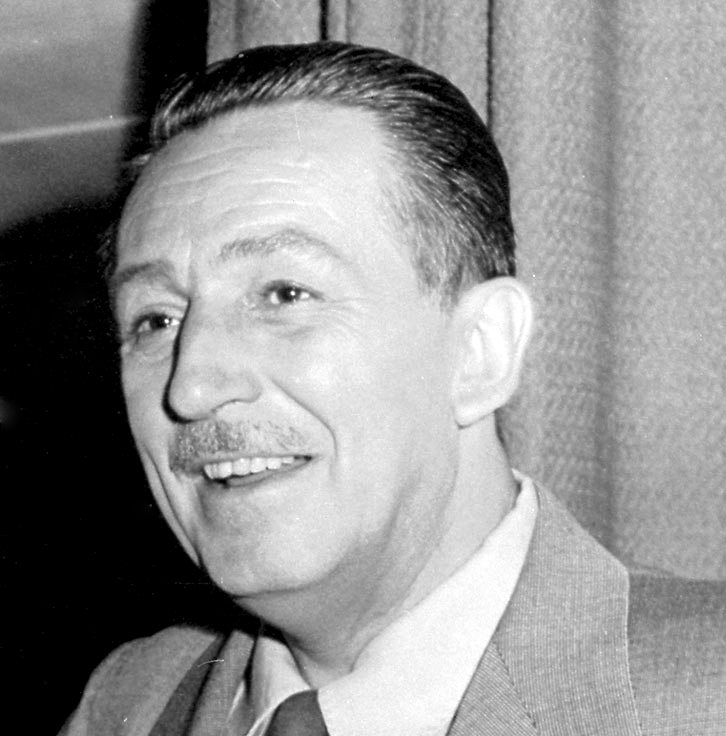
Walt Disney acknowledged his debt to McCay's example.

McCay's work, grounded solidly in his understanding of realistic perspective, presaged the techniques featured in Walt Disney's feature films. Disney paid tribute to McCay in 1955 on an episode of Disneyland. The episode, "The Story of Animated Drawing", gave a history of animation, and dramatized McCay's vaudeville act with Gertie. Robert was invited to the Disney studios as a consultant on the episode, where Disney told him, "Bob, all this should be your father's".

Animator and McCay biographer John Canemaker produced a film in 1974 called Remembering Winsor McCay, narrated by McCay's animation assistant John Fitzsimmons. Canemaker helped coordinate the first retrospective of McCay's films at the third International Animation Film Festival in 1975 in New York, which led to a film show at the Whitney Museum of American Art in winter 1975–76. Canemaker also wrote a biography in 1987 called Winsor McCay: His Life and Art. In 2005, a revised and expanded version of the biography was released, which comics scholar Jeet Heer called "far and away the most scholarly and intelligent biography ever written about an American cartoonist". Animation scholar Paul Wells stated, "McCay's influence on the history of animation cannot be understated". Film critic Richard Eder lamented that as an animation pioneer McCay was not able to reach the potential suggested by his work. Eder compared McCay to the Italian primitives of the early Renaissance, highly skilled "in the limited techniques they could command". Heer wrote that McCay's strength was in his visuals, but that his writing and characters were weak.

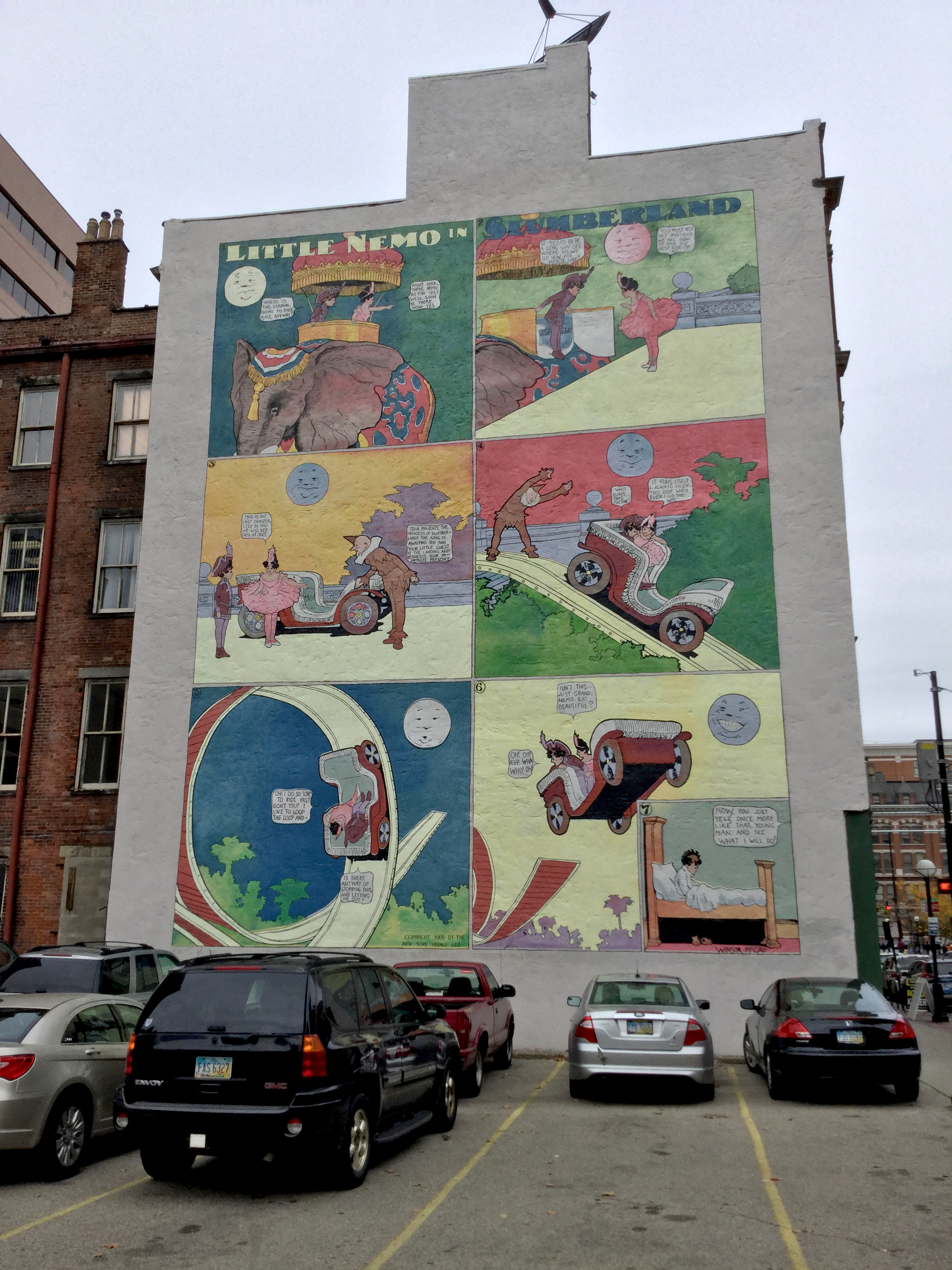
Mural of a Little Nemo in Slumberland comic in downtown Cincinnati, Ohio

Italian filmmaker Federico Fellini read Little Nemo in the children's magazine Il corriere dei piccoli, and the strip was a "powerful influence" on the filmmaker, according to Fellini biographer Peter Bondanella. Comics historian R. C. Harvey has called McCay "the first original genius of the comic strip medium" and in animation. Harvey said that McCay's contemporaries lacked the skill to continue with his innovations, so that they were left for future generations to rediscover and build upon.

McCay's work has inspired cartoonists from Carl Barks to Art Spiegelman. Robert Crumb called McCay a "genius" and one of his favorite cartoonists. Art Spiegelman's 1974 "Real Dream" strip was partially inspired by Rarebit Fiend, and his In the Shadow of No Towers in 2004 appropriated some of McCay's imagery, and included a page of Little Nemo in its appendix. Maurice Sendak's children's book In the Night Kitchen (1970) was an homage to McCay's work, as was Rick Veitch' comic book series Roarin' Rick's Rarebit Fiends (1994–96). Kim Deitch and Simon Deitch's graphic novel The Boulevard of Broken Dreams revolved around a character named Winsor Newton, (Note: A pun on Winsor & Newton, whose ink brushes are popular with cartoonists.) based on an aged McCay. Cartoonist Berke Breathed lamented that the conditions of newspaper cartooning had devolved to such a degree since McCay's time that, had he worked later in the century, he would not have been allotted space sufficient for his expansive full-page fantasies.

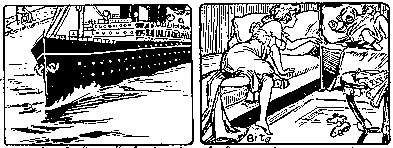
Sigmund Freud's The Interpretation of Dreams (1914) contained a comic strip by Nándor Honti that resembled McCay's work.

As Sigmund Freud's The Interpretation of Dreams first appeared in print in 1899, McCay's major dream strips work have invited speculation of a Freudian influence. But it can be proved that McCay's influence, at least in a secondhand manner, reached Freud: Hungarian artist Nándor Honti, heavily inspired by McCay's Rarebit Fiend, which he had seen when he lived in the United States from 1903 to about 1907, created a comic page titled "A Francia Bonne Álma" ("A French Nanny's Dream", often called "A French Nurse's Dream", 1911), which was passed to Sigmund Freud by the Hungarian psychoanalyst Sándor Ferenczi. Freud then included the comic in the 1914 edition of his book. Honti's comic strongly resembles the work of McCay in its theme, pacing, Art Nouveau style, and closing panel of the dreamer awakening in bed.

The Winsor McCay Award was established in 1972 to recognize individuals for lifetime or career contributions in animation, and is presented as part of the Annie Awards. The Hammer Museum in Los Angeles devoted a room to McCay's work as part of the Masters of American Comics exhibit in 2005. German publisher Taschen published a complete, boxed, full-size edition of Little Nemo in two volumes in 2014 entitled The Complete Little Nemo.

The American astronomer Roy A. Tucker named the asteroid 113461 after McCay in 2002.

Despite dispute over his birthplace, a public park and historical marker honor McCay in Spring Lake, Michigan. The marker, unveiled in 2009, is located in Winsor McCay Park. Winsor McCay Park is the modern-day location of where Union School once stood, wherein McCay "illustrated his first 'commercial' for-sale illustration" in 1880. Developers have been working since 2009 to develop the park into a more sophisticated memorial to McCay including "a large Gertie the Dinosaur statue at the entrance of the park...a bronze statue of Winsor McCay that will be placed next to the historical marker/sign [and] Gertie the Dinosaur stepping-stone footprints [that] will meander through the park, leading back to a scaled-down replica of Union School."

== Style ==
Virtually from the beginning, McCay innovated with the forms of his chosen media. He varied the size and shape of comic strip panels for dramatic effect, as in the second instalment of Little Nemo (October 22, 1905), where the panels grow to adapt to a growing forest of mushrooms. Few of McCay's contemporaries were so bold with their page layouts. Near-contemporary George Herriman with Krazy Kat was the most notable example, but it was not until a generation later that cartoonists such as Frank King with Gasoline Alley, Hal Foster with Prince Valiant, and Roy Crane with Captain Easy attempted such daring designs on their Sunday pages.

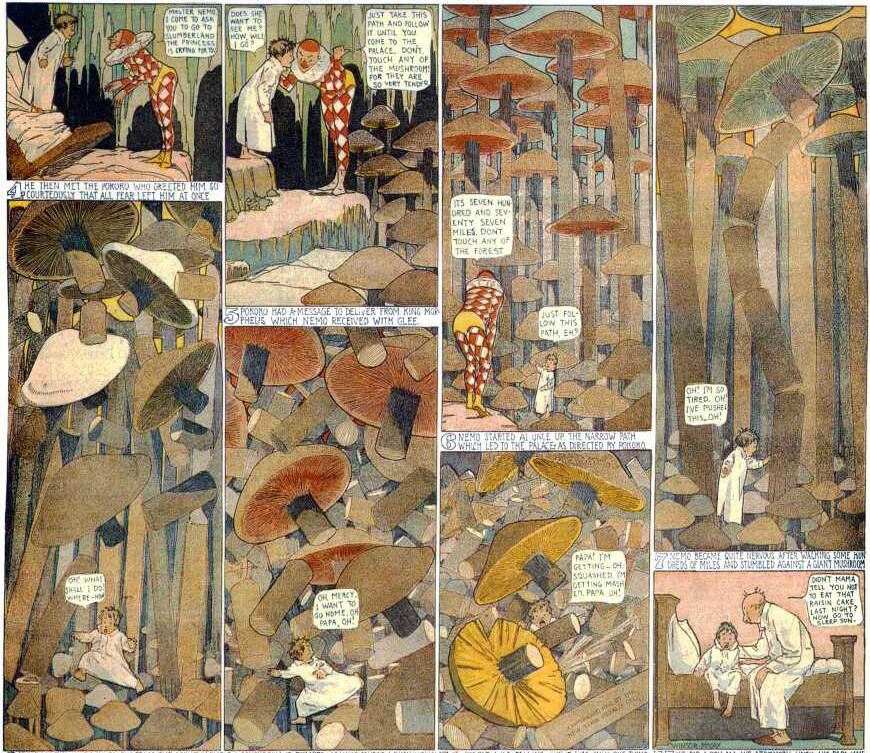
McCay experimented with the formal elements of his strips, as when he had panels grow to accommodate a growing mushroom forest in a Little Nemo episode for October 22, 1905. (Note: Wikimedia Commons has a file available for the full strip.)

McCay's detailed hatching and mastery of perspective enhanced the illusions in his drawings, particularly in Little Nemo. Fantastic grotesqueries such as what McCay witnessed during his time at the Wonderland and Eden Musee appeared often in McCay's work. McCay was noted for the speed and accuracy with which he could draw; crowds of people would gather around to watch him paint billboards.

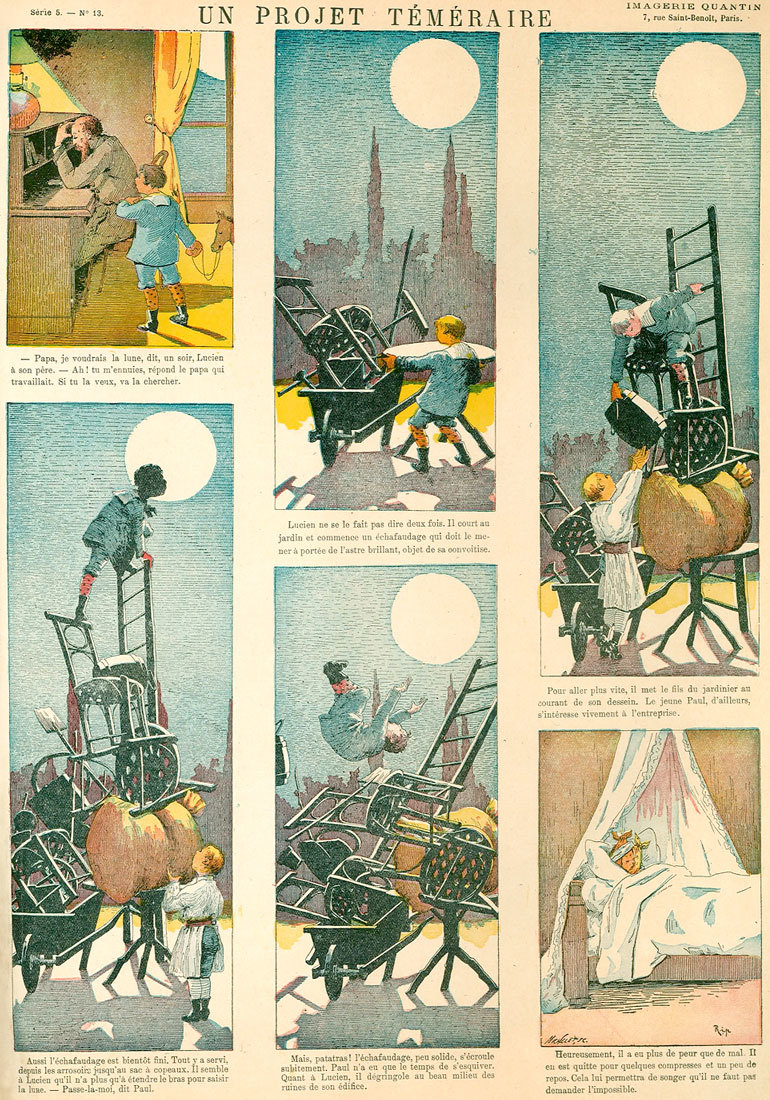
Pages from Images Enphantines displayed the same sort of formal playfulness as in McCay's work Rip, "Un projet téméraire", 1888

McCay had a taste for the ornate. The architecture he drew was inspired by that of carnivals, the 1893 World's Columbian Exposition in Chicago and the detailed illustrations in British illustrated newspapers The Illustrated London News and The Graphic. The Maison Quantin of Paris published a series of illustrated books called Images Enphantines, whose pages bear a striking resemblance to McCay's early Little Nemo strips, both in their graphic sense and their imaginative layouts.

To Canemaker, McCay had an "absolute precision of line" akin to those of Northern Renaissance artist Albrecht Dürer and 19th-century French illustrator Gustave Doré. McCay drew with Higgins black drawing ink, Gillott No. 290 pens, art gum, a T-square and angle, and an assortment of Venus lead pencils. In his early magazine cartoons McCay often painted in gouache.

McCay used metafictional techniques such as self-referentiality in his work. This was most frequent in Dream of the Rarebit Fiend, where McCay sometimes put himself in the strip, or had characters address the reader. Sometimes characters become aware of the strip itself—a jealous lover tears the very strip apart in which he appears; another character fastens panel borders to his strip when he realizes the artist has forgotten them; and in a Sammy Sneeze episode Sammy's sneeze destroys the panel borders.

In contrast to the high level of skill in the artwork, the dialogue in McCay's speech balloons is crude, sometimes approaching illegibility, and "disfigur[ing] his otherwise flawless work", according to critic R. C. Harvey. This is further highlighted by the level of effort and skill apparent in the title lettering. McCay seemed to show little regard for the dialogue balloons, their content, and their placement in the visual composition. They tended to contain repetitive monologues expressing the increasing distress of the speakers, and showed that McCay's gift was in the visual and not the verbal.

In his comics and animation McCay used stock ethnic stereotypes common in his era. A conscious attempt to offend is not apparent. He depicted blacks as savages, or wishing they could be white. Most prominent were a pair of characters in Little Nemo: the ill-tempered Irishman Flip and the rarely speaking grass-skirted African Little Imp. In the animated Little Nemo, the Anglo-Saxon Nemo is shown drawn in a dignified Art Nouveau style, and controls by magic the more grotesquely caricatured Flip and Imp. Women were few in McCay's work, and were depicted as superficial, jealous, and argumentative; the Princess in Little Nemo never partook in the camaraderie the males shared.

== List of comic strips ==
Comic strips by Winsor McCay
Title	Begin date	End date	Notes
A Tale of the Jungle Imps by Felix Fiddle	Jan 11, 1903	Nov 9, 1903	based on poems written by George Randolph Chester
Mr. Goodenough	Jan 21, 1904	Mar 4, 1904	
Sister's Little Sister's Beau	Apr 24, 1904	Apr 24, 1904	
Phurious Phinish of Phoolish Philipe's Phunny Phrolics	May 28, 1904	May 28, 1904	
Little Sammy Sneeze	Jul 24, 1904	May 26, 1907 (Note: Alexander Braun states: "Little Sammy Sneeze ran much longer than comic researchers believed up until now. Thanks to the support of an extensive collection in Switzerland, evidence has been found of episodes dating up to May 26, 1907.")	
Dream of the Rarebit Fiend	Sep 10, 1904	Jun 25, 1911	
Dream of the Rarebit Fiend	Jan 19, 1913	Aug 3, 1913	revived by the New York Herald, printing left-over strips in color
The Story of Hungry Henrietta	Jan 8, 1905	Jul 16, 1905	
A Pilgrim's Progress By Mister Bunion	Jun 26, 1905	May 4, 1909	appeared in the New York Evening Telegram
Little Nemo in Slumberland	Oct 15, 1905	Jul 23, 1911	1911–14 under the title In the Land of Wonderful Dreams
Little Nemo in Slumberland	Aug 3, 1924	Dec 26, 1926	restarted after McCay returned to the Herald Tribune
Poor Jake	1909	1911	appeared in the New York Evening Telegram
In the Land of Wonderful Dreams	Sep 3, 1911	Dec 26, 1914	Little Nemo retitled when McCay moved to Hearst's papers
Rarebit Reveries	c. 1923	c. 1925	revival of Dream of the Rarebit Fiend; signed "Robert Winsor McCay Jr.", though most likely McCay's artwork
Title	Begin date	End date	Notes

== Filmography ==
Films by Winsor McCay
Title	Year	Notes	File
Winsor McCay, the Famous Cartoonist of the N.Y. Herald and His Moving Comics	April 11, 1911	more commonly called Little Nemo	
How a Mosquito Operates	January 1912	also known as The Story Of A Mosquito	
Gertie the Dinosaur	February 18, 1914	Lost original stage show version	
Winsor McCay, the Famous Cartoonist, and Gertie	December 28, 1914	Expansion of the stage show version, adding a live action introduction in a museum and dialogue inter-titles.	
The Sinking of the Lusitania	May 18, 1918		
Bug Vaudeville	September 12, 1921		
The Pet	September 19, 1921		
The Flying House	September 26, 1921		
The Centaurs	1921	survives only in fragments	
Gertie on Tour	c. 1918–21	survives only in fragments	
Flip's Circus	c. 1918–21	survives only in fragments	
Performing Animals	unknown	original 35mm nitrate film has not survived	
Title	Year	Notes	File

== Bibliography ==
=== Works cited ===
==== Books ====
- Ault, Donald; Andrae, Thomas; Gong, Stephen (2003). "An Interview with Carl Barks: Duckburg's True Founding Father". In Ault, Donald (ed.). Carl Barks: Conversations. University Press of Mississippi. pp. 91–108. LCCN 2002-11790; ISBN 978-1-5780-6501-1, 1-5780-6500-3; ISBN 1-5780-6501-1 (paperback ed.).
- Barrier, Michael (2003). Hollywood Cartoons: American Animation in Its Golden Age. Oxford University Press. ISBN 978-0-19-516729-0.
- Beckerman, Howard (2003). Animation: The Whole Story. Skyhorse Publishing. ISBN 978-1-58115-301-9.
- Bendazzi, Giannalberto (1994). Cartoons: One Hundred Years of Cinema Animation. Indiana University Press. ISBN 978-0-253-31168-9.
- Berenbaum, May R. (2009). The Earwig's Tail: A Modern Bestiary of Multi-Legged Legends. Harvard University Press. ISBN 978-0-674-03540-9.
- Bien, Laura (2011). Hidden History of Ypsilanti. The History Press. ISBN 978-1-60949-289-2.
- Bondanella, Peter (2002). The Films of Federico Fellini. Cambridge University Press. ISBN 978-0-521-57573-7 – via Questia.
- Braun, Alexander (2014). Windsor McKay: The Complete Little Nemo 1905–1927 (2 Vols.). Taschen. p. 11. ISBN 978-3-8365-4511-2, 3-8365-4511-X.
Note: This two-volume oversized set reproduces all 549 full-color installments of Little Nemo in Slumberland (1905–1927), accompanied by extensive annotations and a scholarly study of Winsor McCay's life and work.
- Bukatman, Scott (2012). The Poetics of Slumberland: Animated Spirits and the Animating Spirit. University of California Press. ISBN 978-0-520-95150-1.
- Canemaker, John (2005). Winsor McCay: His Life and Art (Revised ed.). Abrams Books. ISBN 978-0-8109-5941-5.
- Canemaker, John (2018). Winsor McCay: His Life and Art (3 ed.). CRC Press (Taylor & Francis). ISBN 978-1138578876.
- Canwell, Bruce (2009). Mullaney, Dean (ed.). Bringing Up Father: From Sea to Shining Sea the Cross-Country Tour of 1939–1940. IDW Publishing. ISBN 978-1-60010-508-1.
- Crafton, Donald (1993). Before Mickey: The Animated Film 1898–1928. University of Chicago Press. ISBN 9780226116679.
- Dover Publications (1973). "Publisher's Note". Dreams of the Rarebit Fiend. Dover Publications. ISBN 978-0-486-21347-7.
- Gardner, Jared (2012). Projections: Comics and the History of Twenty-First-Century Storytelling. Stanford University Press. ISBN 978-0-8047-8178-7.
- Gutjahr, Paul C.; Benton, Megan L. (2001). Illuminating Letters: Typography and Literary Interpretation. University of Massachusetts Press. ISBN 978-1-55849-288-2.
- Harvey, Robert C. (1994). The Art of the Funnies: An Aesthetic History. University Press of Mississippi. ISBN 978-0-87805-612-5.
- Haverstock, Mary Sayre; Vance, Jeannette Mahoney; Meggitt, Brian L. (2000). "McCay, Winsor Zenic (1869–1934)". Artists in Ohio, 1787–1900: A Biographical Dictionary. Kent State University Press. p. 549. ISBN 978-0-87338-616-6.
- Jacobowitz, Susan (2007). "'Words and Pictures Together': An Interview with Art Spiegelman". In Witek, Joseph (ed.). Art Spiegelman: Conversations. University Press of Mississippi. pp. 152–162. ISBN 978-1-934110-12-6.
- Jamieson, Dave (2010). Mint Condition: How Baseball Cards Became an American Obsession. Atlantic Monthly Press. ISBN 978-0-8021-1939-1.
- Kundert-Gibbs, John; Kundert-Gibbs, Kristin (2009). Action!: Acting Lessons for CG Animators. John Wiley & Sons. ISBN 978-0-470-59605-0.
- Merkl, Ulrich (2007). The Complete Dream of the Rarebit Fiend (1904-1913) by Winsor McCay 'Silas' (.doc). Catalog of episodes & text of the book: Ulrich Merkl. ISBN 978-3-00-020751-8. (on included DVD)
- Nel, Philip (2005). Dr. Seuss: American Icon. Continuum. ISBN 978-0-8264-1708-4.
- Roeder, Katherine (2014). Wide Awake in Slumberland: Fantasy, Mass Culture, and Modernism in the Art of Winsor McCay. Univ. Press of Mississippi. ISBN 978-1-62674-117-1.
- Sito, Tom (2006). Drawing the Line: The Untold Story of the Animation Unions from Bosko to Bart Simpson. University Press of Kentucky. ISBN 978-0-8131-2407-0.
- Stabile, Carol A.; Harrison, Mark (2003). Prime Time Animation: Television Animation and American Culture. Taylor & Francis. ISBN 978-0-415-28326-7.
- Telotte, J. P. (2010). Animating Space: From Mickey to Wall-E. University Press of Kentucky. ISBN 978-0-8131-2586-2.
- Sabin, Roger (1993). Adult Comics: An Introduction. Routledge. ISBN 978-0-415-04419-6.
- Smolderen, Thierry (2014). The Origins of Comics: From William Hogarth to Winsor McCay. University Press of Mississippi. ISBN 978-1-61703-149-6.
- Taylor, Constance, ed. (2005). Winsor McCay: Early Works. Vol. VI. Checker Book Publishing Group. ISBN 978-0-9753808-3-3.
- Taylor, Jeremy (2007). "Some archetypal symbolic aspects of Dream of the Rarebit Fiend". In Merkl, Ulrich (ed.). The Complete Dream of the Rarebit Fiend (1904-1913) by Winsor McCay 'Silas' (.doc). Catalog of episodes & text of the book: Ulrich Merkl. pp. 552–561. ISBN 978-3-00-020751-8. (on included DVD)
- Waugh, Coulton (1947). The Comics. University Press of Mississippi. ISBN 978-0-87805-499-2.
- Wells, Paul (2006). The Fundamentals of Animation. AVA Publishing. ISBN 978-2-940373-02-4.
- Wilson, Scott (2016). Resting Places: The Burial Sites of More Than 14,000 Famous Persons (3rd ed.). McFarland. p. 494. ISBN 9781476625997.
- Winokur, Mark (2012). "Creole Cartoons". In Kessel, Martina; Merziger, Patrick (eds.). The Politics of Humour: Laughter, Inclusion, and Exclusion in the Twentieth Century. University of Toronto Press. pp. 52–81. ISBN 978-1-4426-4292-8.

==== Magazines and journals ====
- Heer, Jeet (2006). "Little Nemo in Comicsland". Virginia Quarterly Review. 82 (2). University of Virginia: 104–121. ISSN 2154-6932. Archived from the original on July 7, 2014.
- McKinney, Kirsten (July 2015). "The Waking Life of Winsor McCay: Social Commentary in A Pilgrim's Progress by Mr. Bunion". International Journal of Comic Art. 17 (1). Archived from the original on September 23, 2020.
- Shannon, Edward A. (2010). "Something Black in the American Psyche: Formal Innovation and Freudian Imagery in the Comics of Winsor McCay and Robert Crumb". Canadian Review of American Studies. 40 (2): 187–211. doi:10.3138/cras.40.2.187. ISSN 1710-114X. PMID 20827838. S2CID 11674940.
- Spencer, David R. (2005). "The Cartoon Research Library at Ohio State University". Journalism History. 31 (1): 46–50. doi:10.1080/00947679.2005.12062671. S2CID 142471191 – via Questia.

==== Newspapers ====
- Heer, Jeet (January 8, 2006a). "The Dream Artist". The Boston Globe. Archived from the original on February 27, 2006.
- Hubbard, Amy (October 15, 2012). "Celebrating Little Nemo by Winsor McCay; his 'demons' made him do it". Los Angeles Times. Archived from the original on February 13, 2013.
- "The Cartoonist Group: Background About Winsor McCay". Archived from the original on May 11, 2008.
- Syracuse Herald staff (July 27, 1934). "Winsor M'Cay Early Comic Artist, Dies". Syracuse Herald. p. 12.

==== Web ====
- Dixon, Gretchen (July 26, 2008). "Winsor McCay Award Recipients Announced at Comic Con, San Diego". Reuters. Archived from the original on December 3, 2013.
- Grand Lodge of British Columbia and Yukon staff (January 26, 2002). "Zenas Winsor McCay". Grand Lodge of British Columbia and Yukon. Archived from the original on March 9, 2021.
- Heller, Steven (November 13, 2007). "The Rarebit Fiend Dreams On: An Interview with Ulrich Merkl". AIGA. Archived from the original on May 10, 2015.
- Markstein, Don (2007). "Dream of the Rarebit Fiend". Don Markstein's Toonopedia.
- van Opstal, Huib (January 2008). "Dreams and Obsessions on Shelf and Screen". For Inspiration Only. Archived from the original on April 29, 2008.
- Taube, Michael (December 25, 2014). "Book Review: The Complete Little Nemo". The Washington Times. Archived from the original on December 26, 2014.
- Young, James E. (2000). "Art Spiegelman's Maus and the After-Images of History". The New York Times. Archived from the original on June 16, 2001.
