= Smear frame =

Animation technique

A sequence of frames from The Dover Boys at Pimento University. Frames in the middle of the characters movement are smear frames, those being elongated inbetweens.

In animation, a smear frame is a frame used to simulate motion blur. Smear frames are used in between key frames and are used to stylistically visualize fast movement along a path of motion. The nature of smear frames helped to reduce production costs of other motion blur techniques used in earlier cartoons.

== History ==
The earliest known usage of smear frames is in the 1912 silent film How a Mosquito Operates. Early examples of smear frames were a stylistic continuation of comic book motion lines, designed to accentuate specific movements and actions.

The modern concept of smear frames was developed and standardized much later by artists like Tex Avery and Chuck Jones at Warner Bros. Cartoons in the 1930's and 40's.

Developed for 2D animation, smear frames did not evolve much even with the emergence of CG animated films in the 1990's. The more sophisticated, rigged style of animation for CG films was not conducive to smear frames at the time.

The earliest notable use of smear frames in a computer animated film was in Hotel Transylvania (2012), in which Genndy Tartakovsky's traditional design philosophies were used to guide the 3D shots.

The first documented textbook researching smear frames was released on December 29, 2024.

== Types of smear frames ==
=== Elongated inbetween ===
Movement of the subject between key poses by distorting it over 1-2 frames. The term first emerged in reference to this type of smear in Richard Williams’ The Animator’s Survival Kit.

=== Multiples ===
Duplication of the subject or parts of the subject along a path of motion. It does not distort the subject and is used for repeated actions like walk cycles.

=== Duplicated smears ===
Parts of the subject duplicate and trail behind the main silhouette to register a heavy sense of speed or weight.

=== Smear trails ===
Sharp or rounded triangular shapes and trailing energy lines extend from the edge of the subject as it's moving.

=== Blob ===
Extreme abstraction where the subject loses distinct features entirely, reducing down to a colored shape or streak to keep the viewer’s eye moving along an arc.

== Smear frames in different media ==
While developed for 2D animation, smear frames can be seen in other mediums that employ the use of animation.

=== In 2D animation ===
- Chuck Jones’ Road Runner cartoons used smears.
- The Legend of Korra combined slight smears with motion blur to emulate a fast motion without distorting the realistic art style.
- Animated with 2D puppetry, YouTube’s Super Science Friends used multiples as to not distort their models.

=== In 3D animation ===
- Hotel Transylvania (2012) employed the use of both elongated in-betweens and multiples, depending on the motion of the shot.
- The Lego Movie (2014) used Lego shapes in the same color as the character to simulate a smear.
- Into the Spider-verse (2018) used squash and stretch with overlaid 2D effects to create smears.Teenage Mutant Ninja Turtles: Mutant Mayhem This 3D film used hand-drawn 2D FX and intentional mesh stretching to mimic chaotic notebook doodles.

=== In stop-motion ===
- Laika’s ParaNorman used 3D printed head replacements that were modeled in various smear shapes.
- Wallace and Gromit used multiples to visualize quick action.

=== In video games ===
Much like 3D animation, smear frames were rarely seen in early video games due to the lack of power in gaming systems. Visually stylistic games with fixed cameras were more likely to have smears.

- Sonic the Hedgehog (1991) smeared Sonic’s feet in his run cycle.
- Crash Bandicoot used multiples and blur on Crash’s spin. According to Lendenfeld, this is the first notable use of smears in a 3D game.
- Jak and Daxter (2001) used elongated inbetweens, though they were limited in how far they could distort the model.

== See also ==
- Inbetweening
- Morphing
- Motion blur
- Onion skinning
