= John Canemaker =

American animator and historian

John Cannizzaro Jr. (born 1943), better known as John Canemaker, is an American independent animator, animation historian, author, teacher and lecturer. In 1980, he began teaching and developing the animation program at New York University, Tisch School of the Arts', Kanbar Institute of Film and Television Department. Since 1988 he has directed the program and is currently a tenured full professor. From 2001-2002 he was Acting Chair of the NYU Undergraduate Film and Television Department. In 2006, his film The Moon and the Son: An Imagined Conversation, a 28-minute animated piece about Canemaker's relationship with his father, won the Academy Award for best animated short. In 2007 the same piece picked up an Emmy award for its graphic and artistic design.

== Biography ==
Raised in Elmira, New York, Canemaker began an acting career which included off-Broadway and advertising work in New York City from 1961 to 1965. In 1967, after a two-year stint in the Army, Canemaker, with funds from acting assignments in TV commercials (he appeared in over 35 advertisements for major products, most famously leading a line of "fat kids, skinny kids, kids who climb on rocks" through Central Park for Armour hotdogs)—and appearing as a cast member of the 1972 WCBS-TV show Patchwork Family, in which he drew on a large sketching pad—he obtained his bachelor of arts degree from Marymount Manhattan College in 1974 and master of fine arts in film from New York University in 1976.

== Career ==
While studying for his Bachelor of Arts degree, Canemaker's childhood interest in animation revived. He began making sponsored animated shorts and wrote the first of more than 100 articles on animation history. His first book, the story of the making of Richard Williams' Raggedy Ann and Andy, was published in 1977 as The Animated Raggedy Ann and Andy. In 1982, he wrote the introduction of Treasures of Disney Animation Art; in 1987, he published Winsor McCay—His Life and Art; and, in 1991, Felix, the Twisted Tale of the World's Most Famous Cat. There followed Tex Avery: The MGM Years and Before the Animation Begins: the Art and Lives of Disney Inspirational Sketch Artists (both in 1997), Paper Dreams: The Art and Artists of Disney Storyboards (1999), Walt Disney's Nine Old Men and the Art of Animation (2001), and The Art and Flair of Mary Blair (2003).

His research in the history of animation inspired two of his own films, Remembering Winsor McCay (1976) and Otto Messmer and Felix the Cat (1977).

Canemaker's filmography includes independently made animated shorts that are part of the permanent collection of New York's Museum of Modern Art. Among them are The '40s (1974), Street Freaks (1975), Confessions of a Stardreamer (1978), The Wizard's Son (1981), Bottom's Dream (1983), Confessions of a Stand-Up (1993), and Bridgehampton (1998).

In the early 1980s, Canemaker animated several Children's Television Workshop films for Sesame Street, TV commercials, and, in 1981, created the animation sequences for the Warner Bros. feature The World According to Garp. He designed and directed animation sequences in the Academy Award-winning HBO documentary You Don't Have to Die (1988) and the Peabody Award-winning CBS documentary Break the Silence: Kids Against Child Abuse (1994).

John Canemaker: Marching to a Different Toon, a DVD/home video collection of his films, is distributed by Milestone Film & Video/Image Entertainment. In addition, Canemaker writes regularly on animation for The New York Times and is on-camera and audio commentator on DVD versions of The Fantasia Anthology, Dumbo, Beauty and the Beast, Peter Pan, Snow White and the Seven Dwarfs, Cut-up: The Films of Grant Munro, and Winsor McCay: The Master Edition. He has appeared on NBC's Today, PBS' The NewsHour with Jim Lehrer, and Entertainment Tonight, and has lectured throughout the United States and in Brazil, Canada, England, Ireland, France, Germany, Italy, Japan, Slovakia, Spain, Switzerland, and Wales.

In 2006, he received an Award for outstanding contribution to animation studies at the World Festival of Animated Film - Animafest Zagreb.

== Books ==
- The Animated Raggedy Ann and Andy, 1977.
- Treasures of Disney Animation Art (with Robert E. Abrams), 1982.
- Winsor McCay: His Life and Art, 1987.
- Storytelling in Animation: The Art of the Animated Image, Volume 2, editor, 1988, The American Film Institute.
- Felix, The Twisted Tale of the World's Most Famous Cat, 1991, Pantheon, New York, ISBN 0-679-40127-X.
- Tex Avery: The MGM Years, 1942-1955, 1996, Turner Publishing, Atlanta,
- Before the Animation Begins: the art and lives of Disney inspirational sketch artists, 1997.ISBN 0-7868-6152-5.
- Paper Dreams: The Art and Artists of Disney Storyboards, 1999.
- Walt Disney's Nine Old Men and the Art of Animation, 2001.
- The Art and Flair of Mary Blair: an appreciation, 2003.ISBN 0-7868-5391-3.
- Two Guys Named Joe: Master Storytellers Joe Grant & Joe Ranft., 2010. ISBN 978-1-4231-1067-5.
- The Lost Notebook - Herman Schultheis and the secrets of Walt Disney’s movie magic, 2014.ISBN 978-1-61628-632-3.
