= Bob McCay =

American cartoonist

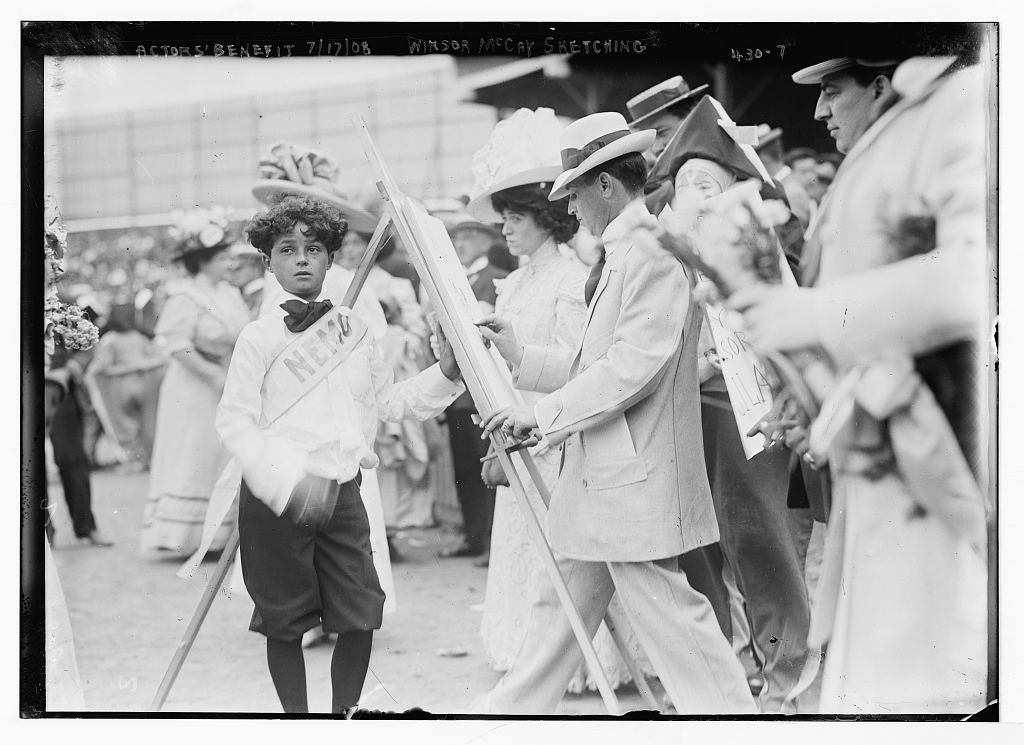
Actors Benefit for Crippled Children, Winsor McCay sketching, 1908

Robert Winsor McCay (June 21, 1896 – April 21, 1962) was an American cartoonist during the golden age of comic books. He worked professionally under the names R. Winsor McCay, Winsor McCay Jr., and Bob McCay. He was the son of cartoonist and animator Winsor McCay.

== Early life ==
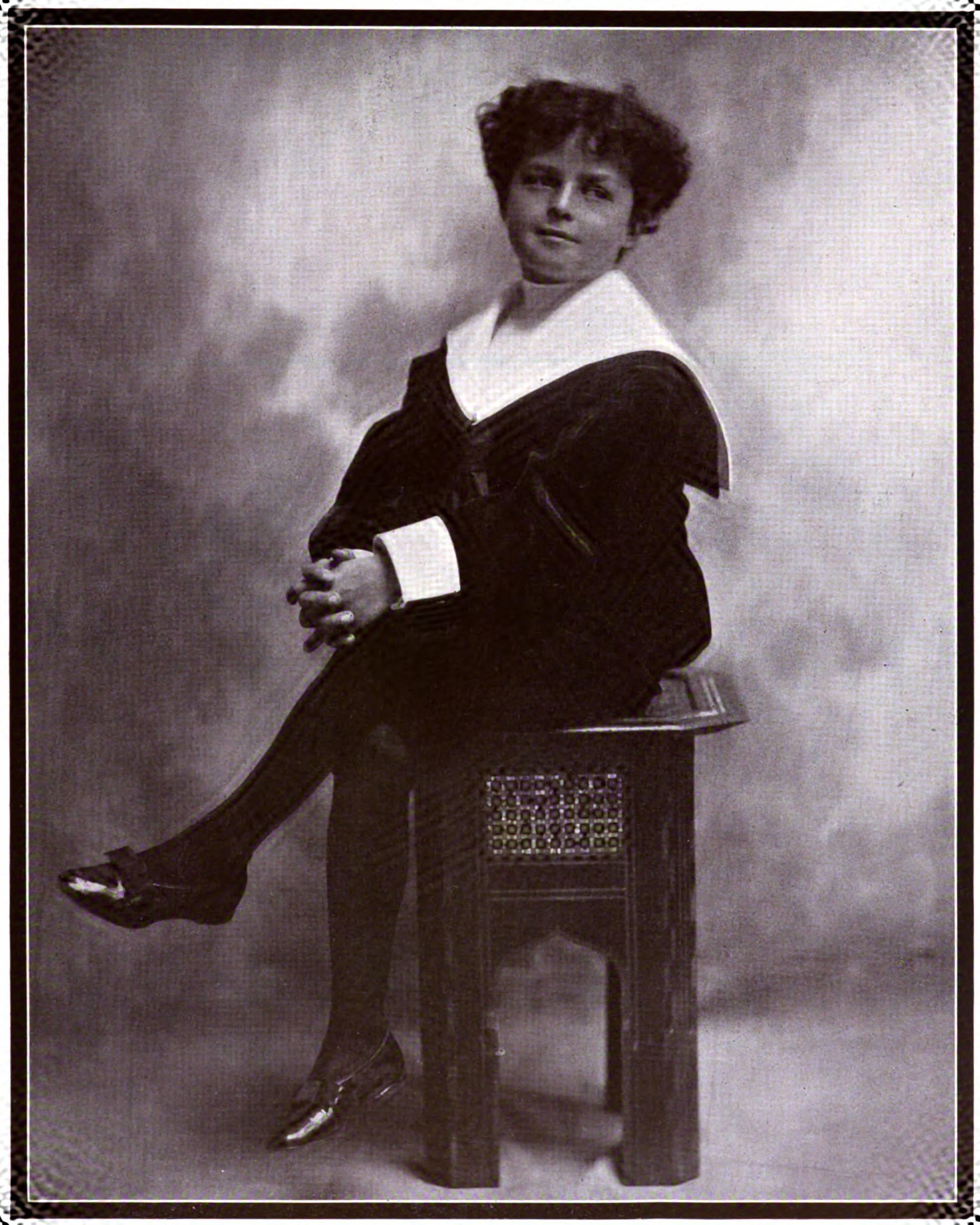
McCay, posing as his father's character Little Nemo in 1908

Robert McCay was born to Winsor and Maude McCay on June 21, 1896. A sister, Marion, was born the following year. In 1903 Winsor moved the family from Cincinnati to New York City in order to work for the New York Herald. Bob was enrolled in Erasmus High School but failed to graduate when he ran away at the age of 17.

At age 19, McCay was enrolled as an art student at the Pratt Institute when he and friend William "Thorp" Adams enlisted with the New York National Guard, 1st New York Cavalry. They were stationed in Texas as part of the border patrol during the Pancho Villa Expedition. Following the withdrawal in 1917, both men were discharged and returned home, and Bob became engaged to Theresa "Tedda" Munchausen.

Three weeks after their discharge, the United States entered the First World War, and the 1st Cavalry, now under the 27th Division, recalled both men back into service with the American Expeditionary Force. The 27th Division was sent to the Western Front in 1918, and was involved in the Hundred Days Offensive which successfully broke the Hindenburg Line. During that period, McCay was shot and gassed, and eventually suffered from shell shock. For his service, he was awarded the British Imperial Military Medal and the Distinguished Service Cross.

Having attained the rank of sergeant, McCay returned home and was honorably discharged in spring 1919, marrying Tedda in 1921. A daughter, Janet, was born in 1922, and a son, Winsor Robert, in 1928.

McCay worked as an art assistant for his father, doing the inking, lettering and detailing work on a number of cartoons. He received sole credit for several, including an animated film. He continued working as an assistant on various projects until his father's death in 1934.

== Golden Age of Comic Books ==
=== Illustrator ===
In 1935, McCay signed with King Features Syndicate to produce Nemo in Adventureland, which featured the characters of his father's work Little Nemo as adults and ran until 1936. He also made political cartoons for the syndicate during the 1930s, and again during the early 1950s.

In 1937, Harry "A" Chesler created a newspaper syndicate, signing McCay to produce a new version of Little Nemo, as well as a daily featuring Impie. Production continued on both after the syndicate was closed in 1938, being utilized in various comic books including Cocomalt Comics and Blue Ribbon, published by MLJ Publications (later Archie Publications). Chesler closed his shop (the first of several times) around 1940. Street & Smith ran Little Nemo in 1942 in Shadow Comics. In 1945, McCay was again with Chesler's shop, producing Little Nemo in Adventureland for Red Seal and Punch Comics until 1947, when the shop closed down for the final time.

=== Inker/colorist ===
Around 1939, McCay began working for National Comics Publications as a colorist, and would continue until about 1945. He was a background illustrator and inker at the Jack Binder Studio, working on the Fawcett character Bulletman, and Street & Smith's Ajax the Sun Man and Blackstone the Magician.

== McCay-Richardson Syndicate ==
In 1947, McCay attempted to release a modernized version of his father's Little Nemo and formed the McCay-Richardson Features Syndicate with distributor Duke Richardson. McCay took his father's original drawings and cut individual frames out, pasting them to fit into a half-broadsheet page format, providing new dialogue and colours. The McCay-Richardson Syndicate distributed this version from approximately March to December 1947.

Bob eventually worked as an illustrator in Training Aids/Special Services for Fort Ord, California. He died of cancer on April 21, 1962.
