= The Flying House =

The Flying House may refer to:

- The Flying House (1921 film), a 1921 animated film by Winsor McCay
- The Flying House (TV series), a 1982–1983 Japanese animated TV series
