= Kōichi Kitamura =

Japanese voice actor (1931–2007)

- 北村 弘一
- Born: Hajimu Kimura; December 18, 1931; Osaka, Japan
- Died: October 2, 2007 (aged 75); Shinjuku, Tokyo, Japan
- Occupation: Voice Actor
- Years active: 1959–2007
- Agent: Mausu Promotion

Hajimu Kimura (木村 一, Kimura Hajimu; December 18, 1931 – October 2, 2007), better known by the stage name Kōichi Kitamura (北村 弘一, Kitamura Kōichi), was a Japanese voice actor born in Osaka, Japan. Kitamura was employed by the talent management agency Mausu Promotion. He is known for dubbing roles played by Peter Cushing. He died on October 2, 2007, of pneumonia.

== Anime ==
=== TV ===
1968

- Animal 1 (Shirou Azuma)
- Sabu to Ichi Torimono Hikae (Saheiji)

1969

- Moomin (Herumu)

1970

- Ashita no Joe (Hyodo)

1971

- Andersen Stories (Carl's Father)
- Tensai Bakabon (Koichi Kitamura)
- Marvelous Melmo (Waregarasu)

1972

- Onbu Obake (Miyasu)

1973

- Karate Baka Ichidai (Kato)
- Kerokko Demetan (Ametaro)
- Casshan (Dr. Kozuki)
- Fables of the Green Forest (Rocky's Father)
- Wansa-kun (Kouta's Father)

1974

- Chiisana Viking Vicke (Grampa Ulobe)

1975

- Time Bokan (Da Vinci)

1977

- Yatterman (Helmet)

1978

- Takarajima (Redroose)
- Lupin III: Part II (Chen Dongnan, Conan Drill, Hong Xiuquan, Jio Makurido, King, Monsieur Dalí, Musshu Dare/Inspector Magure, Nanja, Sharlock, Sherlock, Shuuzen Kou)

1979

- Toshi Gordian (Saxinder)
- The Rose of Versailles (Jeweler)

1980

- Ojamanga Yamada-kun (Gotou, Sori)

1981

- Urusei Yatsura (Shuutarou's Grandfather)

1982

- Space Adventure Cobra (Carbine)
- The Mysterious Cities of Gold (Kuraka)

1983

- The Super Dimension Century Orguss (Gove, Gorb)
- Manga Nihon-shi (Toyotomi Hideyoshi)

1984

- Lupin III: Part III (Yunkeru, Spawlding)

1985

- Touch (Coach Nishio)
- Highschool! Kimengumi (Gorō Mutsu)

1987

- City Hunter (Informer, Kouzou)
- Fist of the North Star 2 (Petero)

1988

- Little Lord Fauntleroy (Jefferson)
- Tatakae!! Ramenman (Shinjuku no Chichi)
- Hai Akko Desu (Taiichi)

1989

- Ranma ½ (Sakuramochi Salseman, Ultra)

1990

- Like the Clouds, Like the Wind (Mano)
- RPG Densetsu Hepoi (Paru Grandpa)

1991

- Lupin the 3rd: Napoleon's Dictionary (Old Scientist)

1992

- Hime-chan's Ribbon (King)
- YuYu Hakusho (Youda)
- Lupin the 3rd: From Siberia with Love (Bucchu)

1994

- Samurai Shodown: The Motion Picture (Shiranui Gen'an)
- Mahoujin Guru Guru (Feifei)

1995

- Soar High! Isami (Isami's Grandfather)
- Ninku (Gauni)
- Bit the Cupid (Bacchus)

1996

- Virtua Fighter (Shun Di)
- Kochira Katsushika-ku Kamearikouen-mae Hashutsujo (Kanbei Ryotsu, Taro Urashima)
- Dragon Ball GT (Eskar)
- Mojacko (Mujanka)
- Rurouni Kenshin (Jūsanrō Tani, Nenji Kashiwazaki)

1997

- Pokémon (Ryu)

1998

- Prince Mackaroo (Owner)
- Super Doll Licca-chan (Oldman)
- Outlaw Star (Hadul)
- The Mysterious Cities of Gold (Papamakayo)

1999

- Gozonji! Gekkō Kamen-kun (First Gekkou-Kamen)
- Trouble Chocolate (Lake Annecy NG)

2000

- Sakura Wars (Aritsune Hanakouji)
- Hidamari no Ki (Genshou Ikawa)

2001

- Touch: Cross Road - Kaze no Yukue (Simon)
- Digimon Tamers (Chou's Sensei)
- Hajime no Ippo (Chairman Naniwa)

2002

- Patapata Hikōusen no Bōuken (Gordon)
- Pecola (Policeman Kuada, Professor Kamikutta)
- Ghost in the Shell: Stand Alone Complex (Old Man)

2003

- Gad Guard (Gary)
- Mermaid Forest (Natsume's Father)
- Last Exile (Anatoray Emperor)

2004

- Zatch Bell (Jii)
- Saiyuki Gunlock (Goku's Touken)
- Monster (General Helmut Wolfe)

2005

- Gallery Fake (Elder)
- Shinshaku Sengoku Eiyū Densetsu - Sanada Jū Yūshi The Animation (Sado-no-kami Masanobu Honda)

2006

- One Piece (Professor Clover)

2007

- Kaiketsu Zorori (Okappa)

=== OVA ===
- Armored Trooper Votoms: Big Battle (Cherokee)
- The Heroic Legend of Arslan (Jon Bodan)
- Key the Metal Idol (Dr. Murao Mima)
- Macross Plus (General Gomez)

=== Movies ===
- Akira (Miyako, Committee Member A)
- Little Nemo: Adventures in Slumberland (Professor Genius)
- Doraemon: Nobita and the Birth of Japan (Elder)
- Doraemon: Nobita and the Knights on Dinosaurs (Section Chief)
- Doraemon: Nobita's Galactic Express (Ninja Master)
- Doraemon: The Record of Nobita: Spaceblazer (Mesu)
- The Heroic Legend of Arslan (Jon Bodan)
- Sakura Wars series (Count Aritsune Hanakoji)
- Touch series (Coach Nishio)
- Urusei Yatsura: The Final Chapter (Upa)
- Ultra Nyan: Hoshizora Kara Maiorita Fushigi Neko (1997) (Doctor)
- Ultra Nyan 2: Happy Daisakusen (movie) (1998) (Doctor)

=== Games ===
- Sakura Wars 2: Thou Shalt Not Die (1998) (Teruho Hanakoji)
- Brave Fencer Musashi (Yukkeru Jii)
- Lunar: The Silver Star (Faidy (Quark) the White Dragon)
- Sakura Wars series (Count Aritsune Hanakoji)
- Tenchu series (Naotada Sekiya)
- Tokimeki Memorial Girl's Side (Garçon Ito)

=== Dubbing ===
==== Live-action ====
- Alien (1981 Laserdisc edition) (Brett (Harry Dean Stanton))
- A Better Tomorrow III: Love & Death in Saigon (Michael's Father (Shih Kien))
- Buffalo Bill and the Indians, or Sitting Bull's History Lesson (1981 TV Asahi edition) (Nate Salsbury (Joel Grey))
- Django (Brother Jonathan)
- Dragon Lord (The Big Boss (Hwang In-shik))
- Indiana Jones and the Last Crusade (The Grail Knight (Robert Eddison))
- James Bond series
  - Goldfinger (1978 NTV edition) (Colonel Smithers (Richard Vernon))
  - Moonraker (General Gogol)
  - A View to a Kill (Q)
  - Licence to Kill (Q)
  - Tomorrow Never Dies (Q)
  - The World Is Not Enough (2003 TV Asahi edition) (Q)
- Kramer vs. Kramer (Spencer (Jack Ramage))
- Roman Holiday (The Ambassador of Princess Ann's country)
- The Score (Danny (Paul Soles))
- She-Wolf of London (Reverend Goodbody (Adrian Cairns))
- Stuck on You (Morty O'Reilly (Seymour Cassel))
- Tower of Death (Billy's Father)

==== Animation ====
- Animaniacs (Dr. Otto Scratchansniff)
- DuckTales (Scrooge McDuck)
- DuckTales the Movie: Treasure of the Lost Lamp (Scrooge McDuck)
- Felix the Cat (Professor)
- Muppets Tonight (Waldorf, Dr. Phil Van Neuter)
- Ned's Newt (Shopkeeper)
- The Simpsons (Mr. Burns)
- The Rescuers
- The Aristocats (Georges Hautecourt)
- Snow White and the Seven Dwarfs (Sleepy)
- The Wild Thornberrys Movie (Col. Radcliffe Thornberry)

== Live action ==
- Moonlight Mask (Policeman, others)
