= Professor Genius =

Professor Genius is a character who originated in the comic strip Little Nemo in Slumberland by Winsor McCay and other subsequent media. He is the right-hand man to King Morpheus, the ruler of Slumberland. His main jobs are to look after the Princess, Little Nemo, and make sure the King's things are in order.

== Little Nemo comics ==
In the original Little Nemo comics, musical and vaudeville, Professor Genius appeared with a different personality and appearance as Dr. Pill.

== Little Nemo: Adventures in Slumberland ==
Professor Genius appears in Little Nemo: Adventures in Slumberland, voiced by René Auberjonois. He is given the task of bringing Little Nemo to Slumberland by dirigible and is successful. Along the way he looks after Nemo and introduces him to King Morpheus and Princess Camille. He also brings Nemo to his prince lessons, which Nemo detests. After the Nightmare King is released, Professor Genius joins Nemo's group to save the King of Slumberland.

== Other appearances ==
Professor Genius appears in the Nemo arcade game; he is seen in the opening and ending scene
