= Little Sammy Sneeze =

Comic strip by Winsor McCay

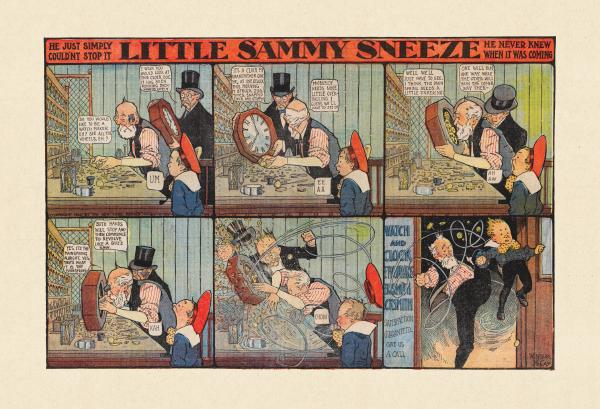
- Sammy disrupts the work of a clockmaker in the Little Sammy Sneeze episode for September 18, 1904.
- Author: Winsor McCay
- Launch date: July 24, 1904
- End date: May 26, 1907
- Publisher: New York Herald

Little Sammy Sneeze was a comic strip by American cartoonist Winsor McCay. In each episode the titular Sammy sneezed himself into an awkward or disastrous predicament. The strip ran from July 24, 1904 until at least May 26, 1907 in the New York Herald, where McCay was on the staff. It was McCay's first successful comic strip; he followed it with Dream of the Rarebit Fiend later in 1904, and his best-known strip Little Nemo in Slumberland in 1905.

In contrast to the imaginative layouts of Little Nemo, Sammy Sneeze was confined to a rigid grid and followed a strict formula: Sammy's sneeze would build frame by frame, contorting the protagonist's face until it erupted in the second-to-last panel. In the closing panel he suffered the consequences—often a kick in the rear.

McCay's artwork was finely detailed and highly accurate in its persistent repetition. He delved into modernist experimentation, shattering fourth walls and even the strip's panel borders. The panel-by-panel buildup displayed McCay's concern with depicting motion, a concern that was to culminate in his pioneering animated films of the 1910s, such as Gertie the Dinosaur (1914).

== Premise ==
The strip follows a simple concept: in each weekly instalment, Sammy sneezes with such power that it wreaks havoc with his surroundings. His sneeze builds until its release with the onomatopoeia "Chow!" in the second-to-last panel. In the last panel he suffers the consequences—being driven away by one of his victims, or often receiving a kick in the rear.

Examples of Little Sammy Sneeze

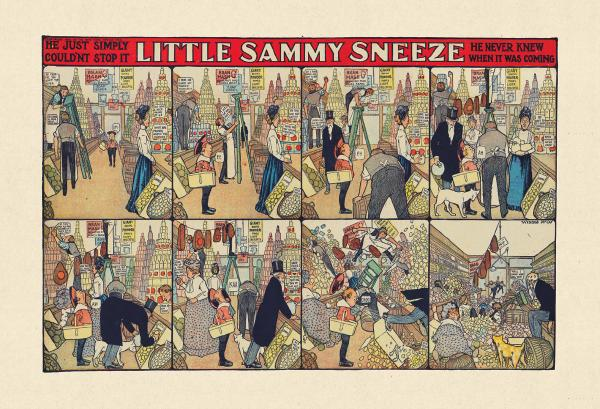
September 11, 1904

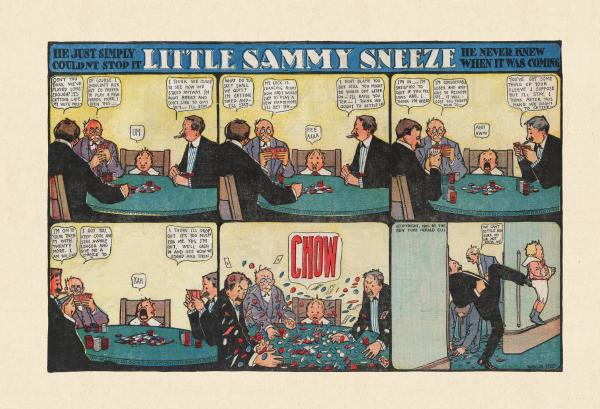
April 30, 1905

== Background ==
Winsor McCay worked in dime museums in Cincinnati from 1891, where he drew posters and advertisements. His ability to draw quickly with great accuracy drew crowds when he painted advertisements in public. He began working as a newspaper cartoonist full-time in 1898, and also freelanced for humor magazines. McCay moved to New York City in 1903 to work for the New York Herald, leaving behind his first comic strip, A Tale of the Jungle Imps by Felix Fiddle. From January 1904 he created a number of other short-lived strips, before finding popular success with Sammy Sneeze that July. In addition to his editorial cartooning, in 1905 he was producing five regular comic strips: Little Sammy Sneeze, Dream of the Rarebit Fiend, Little Nemo in Slumberland, Hungry Henrietta, and A Pilgrim's Progress. Little Sammy Sneeze was one of three strips (with Little Nemo and Hungry Henrietta) that starred a child protagonist; this may have been under the influence of Richard F. Outcault's popular Yellow Kid and Buster Brown strips.

== Style and analysis ==
The strip was almost always laid out in a rigid grid: Sammy's sneeze builds in the first four panels to a release in the fifth and consequences for Sammy in the sixth. This is in contrast to the great variety of panel sizes and layouts displayed in McCay's earlier strip The Jungle Imps, and later much more prominently in Little Nemo.

Sammy was inarticulate, making little more than mouth noises; the adults around him conversed, but in a monotonous manner that did not invite careful reading. Neither did he learn from his foibles nor grow as a character. Sammy and McCay's other child protagonists differ from those of Outcault and other popular cartoonists, such as Rudolph Dirks and his rambunctious, pranking Katzenjammer Kids. Sammy takes no pleasure in the trouble he causes; rather, as the strip's header declares: "He just simply couldn't stop it". On occasion his sneezes have positive consequences, as when he frightens a stubborn mule to move out of the way of an oncoming train, (Note: The Little Sammy Sneeze episode for July 2, 1905) or foils a group of kidnappers. (Note: The Little Sammy Sneeze episode for February 12, 1905)

Though not to the degree applied to Little Nemo, McCay's backgrounds were heavily detailed, and he drew monotonous, repetitive images with great accuracy; McCay later applied these skills to his animation work. The backgrounds remain the same from panel to panel, while passersby unwittingly pass Sammy during his buildup. During the buildup McCay presents people going about their lives; to comics historian Thierry Smolderen: "The reading of these pages is most enjoyable not in the repetitive buildup of the sneeze itself, but in the beautifully varied and fleshed out description of the human activities that are so violently interrupted by the explosion."

Examples of Little Sammy Sneeze

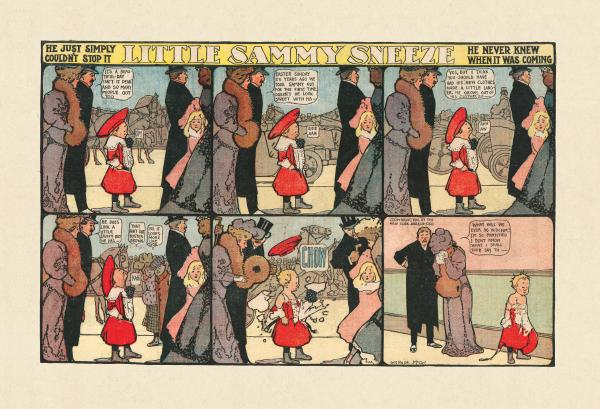
Sammy's genteel dress was a source of humor
April 16, 1905

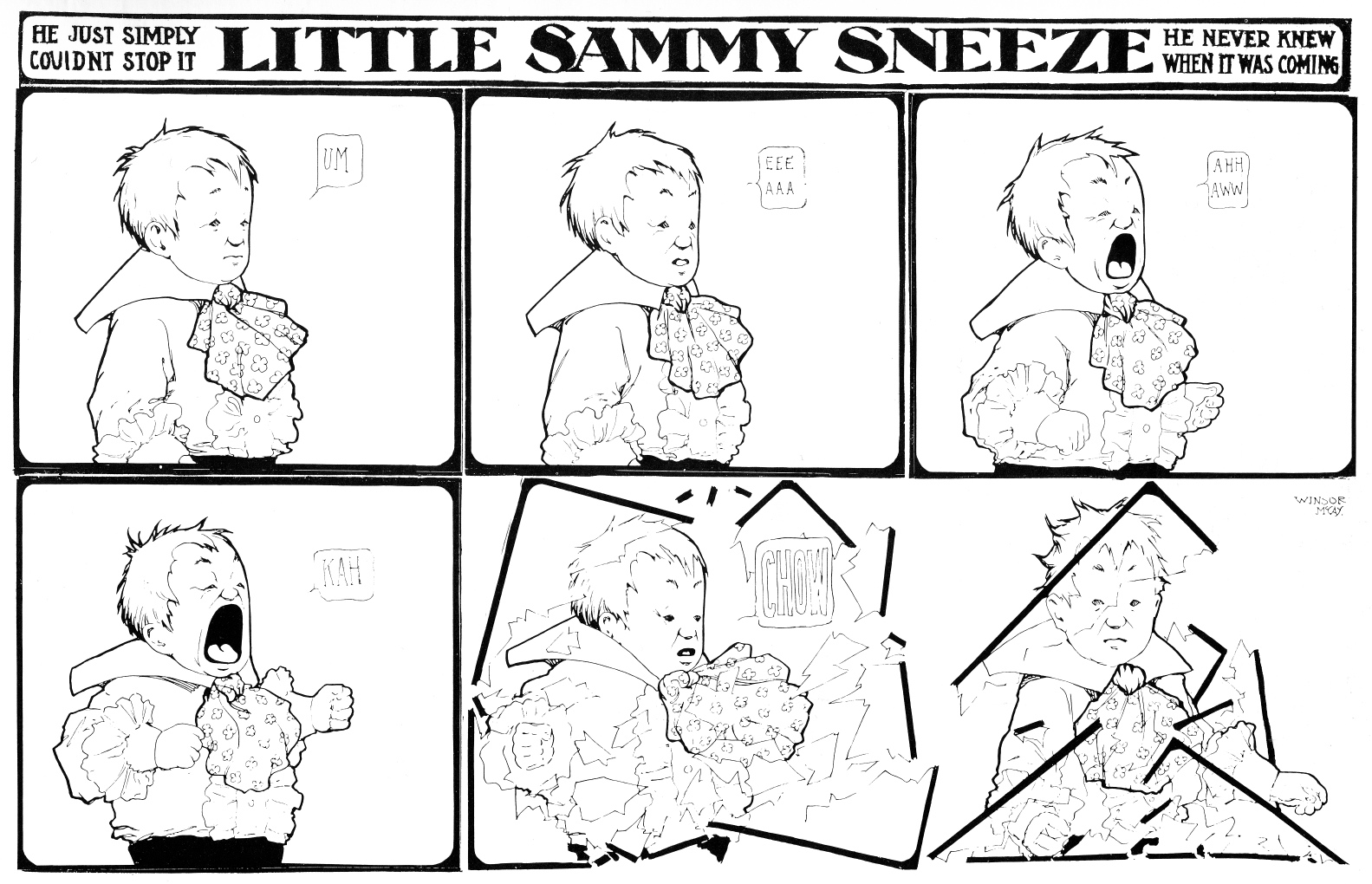
Sammy destroys his panel borders
September 24, 1905

McCay took the visual ideas he experimented with in Little Sammy Sneeze and Dream of the Rarebit Fiend (also 1904) and more fully explored them when he began Little Nemo the following year. While the technical dexterity Little Nemo draws the greatest share of attention among McCay's works, Katherine Roeder finds the formally lower-key Sammy Sneeze "tested the limits of visual representation and demonstrated the comic strip's potential as a vehicle for modernist experimentation". McCay was fond of breaking the fourth wall, a well-known example of which is the September 24, 1905, episode: the gag unfolds according to formula, culminating in the destruction of the very panel borders of the comic strip itself. The strip may pay homage to Fred Ott's Sneeze — a filmstrip of the progression of a man sneezing. The photographs appeared in Harper's Magazine in 1884 and were well known. As in the film, and unusual for the Sammy Sneeze strip, the September 24 episode has a closeup of the sneezer against a blank background, and Sammy's gestures echo those of Ott.

McCay was concerned with depicting the seldom-perceived minutiae of movement, though his was not the scientific curiosity found in the chronophotography of Eadweard Muybridge, Étienne-Jules Marey, and Georges Demenÿ. McCay emphasizes the lack of order and irrational unpredictability of the human body. McCay's concern was to culminate in his pioneering animated films such as Gertie the Dinosaur (1914). Comic strips as early as A. B. Frost's incorporated the repetition of backgrounds inspired by chronophotography, and by the time of Sammy Sneeze had become a standard comic-strip trope—one comics historian Thierry Smolderen suggests McCay may have deliberately parodied.

McCay had likely seen Fred Ott's Sneeze (1894).

Though the story of mischievous children and the trouble they caused was typical of comic strips of the day, in contrast to such other popular strips as The Katzenjammer Kids and Buster Brown, the havoc Sammy wreaked was unintentional. To Roeder, the humor at the expense of both the adults and the child likely appealed to a broad range of readers, and may have broadened the appeal of comic strips to conservative middle-class audiences. These audiences may have seen the inevitable consequences for Sammy as a restoration of a natural social order, one that was left rent asunder in other comic strips.

Sammy is given an unappealing character design and personality, with dull features and expression that do not invite the reader's sympathy; his character is never developed. Similar to Buster Brown, Sammy dresses in a dress shirt, lace collar, and cravat. This style associated with middle-class aspirations and popularized toward the end of the 19th century in the wake of the success of Little Lord Fauntleroy. By the time Sammy Sneeze had begun the style was a subject of ridicule; in an age when respectable society went to great lengths to avoid drawing attention to bodily functions, it emphasized the humorous contortions of Sammy's face as he built up toward his sneeze. His sneeze could also tear down other symbols of the middle-class, such as an expansive department store display of goods at Christmas.

The strip's header declared to each side of the title "He just simply couldn't stop" and "He never knew when it was coming", and never strayed from the basic formula of build-up, release, and consequence. McCay was to make use of such framing devices throughout his career, as in Little Nemo where the reader could rely on the protagonist awakening in the closing panel each week. Scott Bukatman and Thierry Smolderen saw the monotony of Sammy Sneeze as an attempt by McCay at parody—one that, in Smolderen's words, "chuckles at the absurdity of ... doing the same thing ad nauseam".

== Publication ==
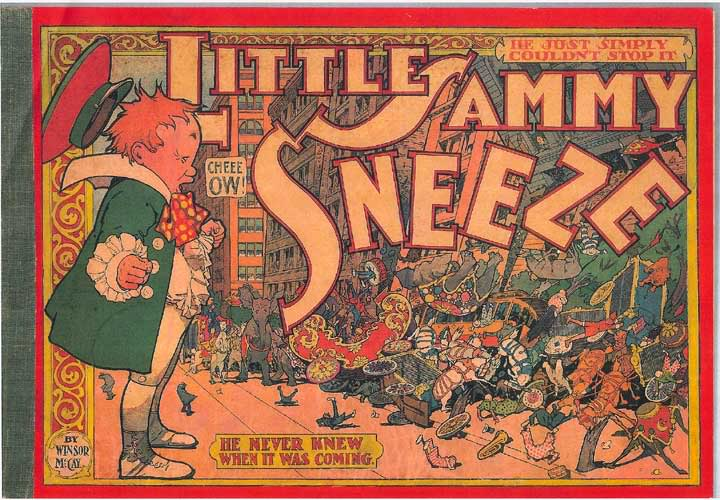
The first Little Sammy Sneeze book collection appeared in 1906.

Little Sammy Sneeze began on July 24, 1904, in the New York Herald, where McCay had joined the staff in 1903. It ran in color until partway through 1905, and continued afterwards in black and white until at least May 26, 1907. McCay joined William Randolph Hearst's newspapers in 1911, and Sammy made a reappearance in them on February 4, 1912, in a one-off strip titled "All at Once—Kerchoo!—He Sneezed".

During Sammy's run, McCay's Hungry Henrietta strip tended to appear on the same date as Sammy Sneeze, including every Henrietta strip that ran in 1905. One crossover strip (Note: The Little Sammy Sneeze episode for May 7, 1905) ends with Henrietta eating candy that Sammy has sneezed onto the floor.

In 1906, a compilation volume of the strips appeared—not only in the United States, but in France where the Herald's publisher James Gordon Bennett Jr. was based. (Note: The French title is Petit Sammy Éternue.) Sammy was one of the earliest American strips to appear in Europe.

Sunday Press Books released a deluxe 11 in × 16 in (28 cm × 41 cm) landscape-format hardcover volume called Little Sammy Sneeze: The Complete Color Sunday Comics 1904–1905 in 2007. On the reverse of each Sammy Sneeze page appears a non-Sammy Sneeze strip—the complete run of McCay's The Story of Hungry Henrietta, as well as selections from John Prentiss Benson's The Woozlebeasts, and Gustave Verbeek's The Upside-Downs of Little Lady Lovekins and Old Man Muffaroo and The Terrors of the Tiny Tads. These bonus strips appear in monochrome to Sammy Sneeze's color, as newspapers at the time normally printed color on only one side of the page.

== Legacy ==
After a three-year run, McCay dropped the strip, while continuing to work on Dream of the Rarebit Fiend, Pilgrim's Progress, and his best-known work, Little Nemo. It has since mostly been remembered as a precursor to McCay's better-known strips, receiving little attention itself outside of a few key strips. The strip's concept was later picked up by the creators of characters such as Sneezly Seal and Li'l Sneezer.
