= Little Nemo: Adventures in Slumberland =

1989 Japanese-American animated musical film

- Original Japanese theatrical release poster

Japanese name
- Katakana: ニモ
Transcriptions
- Revised Hepburn: Nimo
- Directed by: Masami Hata; William Hurtz
- Screenplay by: Chris Columbus; Richard Outten
- Story by: Jean "Mœbius" Giraud; Yutaka Fujioka
- Based on: Little Nemo by Winsor McCay
- Produced by: Yutaka Fujioka
- Starring: Mickey Rooney; René Auberjonois; Gabriel Damon
- Cinematography: Hajime Hasegawa
- Edited by: Takeshi Seyama
- Music by: Thomas Chase; Stephen Rucker; Songs: Richard M. Sherman; Robert B. Sherman
- Production company: Tokyo Movie Shinsha
- Distributed by: Toho-Towa (Japan); Hemdale Film Corporation (US)
- Release dates: July 15, 1989 (Japan); August 21, 1992 (United States)
- Running time: 95 minutes (Original cut); 85 minutes (Edited cut)
- Countries: Japan; United States
- Languages: English; Japanese
- Budget: ¥3 billion; (est. $35 million)
- Box office: ¥0.9 billion ($11.4 million)

Little Nemo: Adventures in Slumberland (released in Japan as simply Nemo (ニモ, Nimo) and credited in some territories as Little Nemo) is a 1989 animated musical fantasy film directed by Masami Hata and William Hurtz. Based on the comic strip Little Nemo in Slumberland by Winsor McCay, the film went through a lengthy development process with a number of screenwriters. Ultimately, the screenplay was credited to Chris Columbus and Richard Outten; the storyline and art style differed from the original version. The original soundtrack was penned by the Academy Award-winning Sherman Brothers. The film features the English dub voices of Gabriel Damon, Mickey Rooney, René Auberjonois, Danny Mann, Bernard Erhard, Laura Mooney, William E. Martin, Alan Oppenheimer, Michael Bell, Sidney Miller, Neil Ross, and John Stephenson.

Even though it derived from an American comic strip, Little Nemo was animated by the Japanese company Tokyo Movie Shinsha and thus is often considered an anime film, although it was a joint production of Japanese and American animators and production companies.

The movie was infamous for being in development hell for much of the 1980s, with many people involved with the production at some point before dropping out. Some of those attached to the film worked at Disney, Lucasfilm, Warner Bros. Cartoons, and Studio Ghibli. Those who expressed interest or were involved at some stage included George Lucas, Chuck Jones, Ray Bradbury, Isao Takahata, Brad Bird, Jerry Rees, Chris Columbus, Ken Anderson, Frank Thomas, Oliver Johnston, Paul Julian, Osamu Dezaki, the Sherman Brothers (Richard M. Sherman and Robert B. Sherman), Hayao Miyazaki (who was working at TMS at the time), and Gary Kurtz.

The film was first released in Japan on July 15, 1989, by the Toho-Towa and in the United States on August 21, 1992, by the Hemdale Film Corporation for the dub. It received mixed reviews with praise for its animation, visuals, music, and voice acting in both Japanese and English versions, but criticism for its characters, pacing, songs, dark tone, and script. The film was also a box-office bomb, earning $11.4 million on a $35 million budget. However, it sold well on home video and has since become a cult film.

== Plot ==
A young boy named Nemo experiences a series of nightmares (including being pursued by a locomotive). Upon awakening the one day, he goes with his pet flying squirrel, Icarus to see a parade welcoming a traveling circus. However, Nemo is unable to see the circus since his parents are too busy to take him. That night, Nemo imitates sleepwalking in an attempt to sneak some pie away, which acts against a promise he had made earlier to his mother, who catches him in the act and makes him run back to his room empty-handed.

Upon falling asleep, Nemo is approached by figures from the circus parade. The circus organist introduces himself as Professor Genius and claims that they had been sent on a mission by King Morpheus, the king of a realm named Slumberland. The mission involves Nemo becoming the playmate of the princess, Camille. Although Nemo initially has reservations about interacting with a girl, he and Icarus decide to set off to fulfill his mission after being persuaded with a gift box of cookies from the princess.

Nemo is taken to Slumberland in a dirigible which he is allowed to drive, causing some chaos, and is introduced to King Morpheus. Morpheus reveals that he summoned Nemo to become his heir to the throne. Morpheus gives Nemo a golden key that opens every door in the kingdom and warns him of a door with a dragon insignia that must never be opened. Nemo is introduced to Princess Camille and the pair roam Slumberland together.

Afterward, Nemo meets the mischievous clown Flip who convinces him to ditch his prince lessons, and later angers a group of cops, forcing him and Nemo to hide out in a cave. There, Nemo discovers the door that Morpheus warned him not to open. Flip tempts Nemo into unlocking the door, which unleashes "the nightmare". Nemo rushes back to Morpheus' castle in time for his coronation ceremony where he is handed the royal scepter, the only thing capable of defeating the Nightmare King, the ruler of Nightmare Land, should he ever return to Slumberland. In the middle of a dance session between Morpheus and Genius, "The Nightmare" reaches the castle and steals Morpheus away. As the partygoers search for a scapegoat, Flip and Nemo accuse each other, though the responsibility goes to Nemo who had the key.

Nemo awakens in his home, which floods with seawater and ejects him and Icarus into the ocean. Genius discovers them and tells Nemo not to blame himself for Morpheus's capture and that Flip is at fault for tempting him, but Nemo accepts his role in the situation, and pledges to find the King. When the three return to Slumberland, they rescue Flip from being shot out of a cannon into outer space because he withheld information on owning a map of Nightmare Land where Morpheus is currently being held.

Nemo, Icarus, Camille, Flip, and Genius set off in a tugboat in search of Morpheus. They are soon sucked into a whirlpool and find themselves in the goblin-infested Nightmare Land. The five come across a group of shapeshifting goblins called Boomps consisting of Oompa, Oomp, Oompe, and Oompy. They wish to aid in the quest to rescue Morpheus. The Nightmare King sends a flock of gigantic bats to seize the rescue party. Nemo attempts to use the scepter, but cannot remember the full incantation, and awakens in his bed along with Icarus again after watching Camille, Flip, and Genius get captured.

The Boomps appear in Nemo's room after he awakes. After reuniting with a lost member of theirs named Oompo who gives Nemo a letter from Morpheus containing the full scepter incantation, the group travels to Nightmare Castle by flying through a portal in the sky. However, they are subsequently trapped in the castle where the Nightmare King demands possession of the scepter, threatening his captives, including Morpheus, to try and force Nemo's compliance. After a fierce battle, Nemo uses the scepter to finally destroy the Nightmare King and purify Nightmare Land, but seemingly at the cost of his own life as well.

As everyone mourns Nemo's death, Morpheus uses the scepter to revive him, and accepts his apology for causing everything, assuring Nemo that his courage has allowed him to make up for his mistake and become a true prince. As Slumberland celebrates the fall of the Nightmare Kingdom, Camille escorts Nemo and Icarus home on the dirigible. She and Nemo then almost share a kiss.

Nemo awakens in his room, where he apologizes to his mother for breaking his promise and trying to take the pie. Nemo's parents also agree to take Nemo to the circus. Nemo stares out the window with Icarus as he looks forward to his new day.

== Cast ==
- Gabriel Damon (Takuma Gōno in the Japanese adaptation) as Nemo, a human boy living in New York City who is taken to Slumberland to be the official playmate of Princess Camille. In actuality, he is being summoned to be the heir to the elderly King Morpheus.
- Mickey Rooney (Chikao Ōtsuka in the Japanese adaptation) as Flip, a clown who is described as a "frightful fellow" by Professor Genius, he is wanted throughout Slumberland for "having fun". He tricks Nemo into accidentally releasing the Nightmare King and blames Nemo for the ruin of Slumberland. In the real world, he is a clown in a circus that stops in Nemo's town.
- René Auberjonois (Kōichi Kitamura in the Japanese adaptation) as Professor Genius, King Morpheus' advisor. He comes to the real world to bring Nemo to Slumberland. In the real world, he is an organ player in a circus that stops in Nemo's town.
- Danny Mann as Icarus, a flying squirrel who is Nemo's best friend. He detests being called a "little rat" (which Princess Camille mistakes him for). His initial relationship with Princess Camille, though rough, eventually changes for the better.
- Bernard Erhard (Kenji Utsumi in the Japanese adaptation) as King Morpheus, the sovereign of Slumberland. He has protected Slumberland for years with the help of the royal scepter: an ancient weapon of great power. In the real world, he is the ringmaster of a circus that stops in Nemo's town.
- William E. Martin (Tarō Ishida in the Japanese adaptation) as the Nightmare King, a demonic horned creature who rules over the realm of nightmares.
- Laura Mooney (Hiroko Kasahara in the Japanese adaptation) as Princess Camille, the daughter of King Morpheus. Though she initially acts somewhat spoiled, she eventually grows to like Nemo. In the real world, she is riding on an elephant in a circus that stops in Nemo's town. Camille was modeled after Leah Allers and TMS wrote her a two-page thank-you letter.
- Greg Burson (Tesshō Genda in the Japanese adaptation) as Nemo's father
- Greg Burson as Flap, Flip's bird companion.
- Jennifer Darling (Mari Yokoo in the Japanese adaptation) as Nemo's mother
- Neil Ross (Hiroshi Ōtake in the Japanese adaptation) as Oompa, a member of the Boomps that befriend Nemo.
- Alan Oppenheimer (Keiichi Nanba in the Japanese adaptation) as Oomp, a member of the Boomps that befriend Nemo.
- John Stephenson (Masaharu Satō in the Japanese adaptation) as Oompo, a member of the Boomps that befriend Nemo and is the largest of the Boomps.
- Sidney Miller (Kōzō Shioya in the Japanese adaptation) as Oompe, a member of the Boomps that befriend Nemo.
- Michael Bell (Hiroko Emori in the Japanese adaptation) as Oompy, a member of the Boomps that befriend Nemo.
- Kathleen Freeman (Kimie Nakajima in the Japanese adaptation) as the dance teacher
- Bever-Leigh Banfield (Seiko Nakao in the Japanese adaptation) as the woman
- John Stephenson (Kazumi Tanaka in the Japanese adaptation) as the dirigible captain
- Bert Kramer (Yukimasa Kishino in the Japanese adaptation) as a goblin, a hideous creature that serves as a member of the Nightmare King's army.
- Beau Weaver (Tarō Arakawa in the Japanese adaptation) as a police officer
- Sherry Lynn as Bon Bon, a Page in Slumberland who works for King Morpheus. In the real world, he and his fellow pages are the drivers of the wagon with the organ in a circus that stops in Nemo's town.
- Guy Christopher as a Courtier and a police officer
- Nancy Cartwright and Ellen Gerstell as the pages, servants of King Morpheus. In the real world, they and Bon-Bon are the drivers of the wagon with the organ in a circus that stops in Nemo's town.
- Tress MacNeille as an elevator creature
- Michael McConnohie as an etiquette master
- Michael Gough as a teacher
- Michael Sheehan as a fencing master
- June Foray as the librarian
- Gregg Berger as the equestrian master

== Production ==
Nemo was the brainchild of producer Yutaka Fujioka, then president of Tokyo Movie Shinsha (TMS). He had long realized the limitations of the animation business in Japan and wanted to enter the U.S. market, so he started a new animation studio and planned to distribute U.S.-Japan co-produced animation films worldwide. He founded Telecom Animation Film in 1975, and embarked on a film adaptation of the legendary comic strip Little Nemo, which was so well known in the U.S. that two film adaptations were proposed during Walt Disney's lifetime. As the first step towards realizing this project, in 1977 he personally flew to Monterey, California, to convince the McCay descendants to allow him to obtain the film rights, and he finally won it in the summer of 1978.

Fujioka had another dream: to make a "full animation" (not Japanese limited animation) film that could compete with Disney. For this purpose, Fujioka hired newcomers with no experience in Japanese TV animation and had them trained by Sadao Tsukioka, followed by Yasuo Ōtsuka. Incidentally, the 1980 pilot film was created by Tsukioka.

However, a lack of funding and inexperienced animators made it difficult to go into Nemo production, so he hired veteran staff away from other studios to work on Lupin the Third Part II, Hayao Miyazaki's film Lupin III: The Castle of Cagliostro, and Isao Takahata's film Jarinko Chie. And he frequently held screenings of those two films of Miyazaki and Takahata for film professionals in the U.S. to showcase his company's capabilities.

In the spring of 1981, Fujioka launched the project after securing a 4 billion yen investment from consumer finance company Lake.

Fujioka initially approached George Lucas, who was then at the height of his career with Star Wars and Indiana Jones, about co-producing the film as a foothold to penetrate the American market. Lucas, however, declined the offer, citing difficulties with the initial draft plot. Fujioka also approached Chuck Jones, but Jones also declined. Fujioka asked Gary Kurtz, who had been recommended by Lucas to replace him, as producer of the American side, and Kurtz readily agreed, appointing Ray Bradbury as screenwriter.

In February 1982, it was announced that Kineto TMS, an American corporation, would be established as a joint venture between TMS and Kurtz's Kineto Graphic, Inc. for the purpose of producing a Japan-US co-production film. At the same time, Fujioka and Kurtz were appointed as executive producers, with Kurtz handling the film's content and Fujioka managing the budget and other aspects of production.

In the summer of 1982, Kurtz had Bradbury and the newly hired Edward Summer completely rewrite the story to reflect his intentions. Bradbury realized that the name "Nemo" (the nobody), when read backward, would be "Omen" (the omen), and prepared a script that said, "Nemo, guided by his split personality Omen, dives deep into the dream world, defeats Omen and returns to the real world." In contrast, the original draft by Hayao Miyazaki was the prototype for the later Laputa: Castle in the Sky, which considered the "dream world" to be an alternate world that existed in reality and was "the story of a boy, a kingdom of abandoned robots and their princess, and airship bandits."

At the same time, Fujioka brought in Frank Thomas and Ollie Johnston from the "Nine Old Men", a legendary group of animators from Disney's early days, as advisors in order to produce "full animation" in the Disney style. At the invitation of the two, a total of 12 Japanese staff members, including Isao Takahata, Hayao Miyazaki, Yasuo Ōtsuka, Yoshifumi Kondō, and Kazuhide Tomonaga, traveled to the United States to receive training in American-style character animation. However, when they saw Miyazaki's sketch, they were puzzled: "We have nothing to teach them." The Japanese staff was also greatly inspired by their creative approach.

The main staff then traveled back and forth between Japan and the U.S. to work jointly with Andy Gaskill and Roger Allers, who were introduced by Thomas and Johnston and who would later support Disney's work.

Miyazaki and Takahata, who was scheduled to join the project as soon as his previous work was finished, were the two candidates for the Japanese director, but Miyazaki was negative about the project itself from the early stage, saying, "A film that professes to be set in a dream world will only make the audience blank out. After reading the first draft of Bradbury's scenario, Miyazaki wondered if it could be considered an entertainment film, and submitted a report to Kurtz summarizing the elements of what he considered an entertaining film, but it was rejected. Next, Miyazaki proposed Fujioka with ideas such as "the story of a young man turned into a beast and a princess in the age of provincial wars," which later became Princess Mononoke, "the story of Demon Extermination of a princess and her wolf," which was based on the American comic ROWLF, and Yara the windmaster and Princess of the dorok derived from it, which later became the image source of Nausicaä of the Valley of the Wind. However, Fujioka had no authority to intervene in the scenarios, and Kurtz never adopted them. Miyazaki then left Telecom on November 22, 1982, without waiting for Takahata to join.

Takahata, who joined the project in just after Miyazaki had left, tried to construct a story based on Peter Pan and Where the Wild Things Are, among others. He then adopted Bradbury's idea and came up with a story structure in which "the main character is split into two positions, each of which becomes a component of the story." This structure was later carried over to Grave of the Fireflies and Only Yesterday. On March 12, 1983, Takahata also clashed with Kurtz over a scenario and left Telecom.

The directors who succeeded the duo were Andy Gaskill and Yoshifumi Kondo, but both soon retired from production.

At that time, Kineto TMS was frequented by animation professionals who had heard rumors of the project or were interested in Japanese animation. John Lasseter first met Hayao Miyazaki here and began to interact with him thereafter. Brad Bird is reported to have informally painted a few image boards.

Brad Bird and Jerry Rees also worked on the film through the American department as animators for a month, while at the same time working on an unproduced adaptation of Will Eisner's The Spirit with Gary Kurtz. During production, the two would regularly ask animators what they were doing, and the response they were commonly given was "We're just illustrating what Bradbury is writing." Upon meeting Bradbury in person and asking him about the story he was writing for the film, he replied "I'm just putting in writing what these wonderful artists are drawing." Bird and Rees left the project soon after their meeting with Bradbury.

Two years passed without a director being selected, and the project was suspended in August 1984 when the production fund ran out.

Kurtz would eventually step down in the fall of 1984. He was involved in other projects, so he did not show up at the Nemo project very often, and when he did occasionally, he caused friction with the Japanese staff, so he was removed from the project. However, the staff continued to change rapidly after that. Kondo went to the U.S. in the summer of 1984 to work with Kurtz and Gaskill, but returned home and began making a 70mm pilot film in September. It was a different film from the actual film, based on the storyboards Tomonaga had drawn when Takahata was a director; after completing it in December, Kondo left Telecom in March 1985. Bradbury also dropped out. Osamu Dezaki was also brought to direct for a brief while and completed another pilot film, but left as well. Jean Giraud (Mœbius), who later joined the project, saw the sketches Miyazaki had left behind and asked Fujioka closely why he did not adopt them. He and Miyazaki then began to interact with each other.

During the hiatus, Fujioka continued to have many people write manuscripts, including Chris Columbus, Mœbius, John Canemaker, Richard Martini and many others. He then re-hired Summer to do yet another screenplay. Ultimately, Richard Outten wrote the script based on a plot Columbus wrote between May 1985 and May 1986 before making his directorial debut with Adventures in Babysitting.

When Lake agreed to an additional investment of 1 billion yen in 1987, Fujioka was the first to cancel his contract with Kurtz, and resume production at the newly established Los Angeles TMS. Fujioka himself became an executive producer and took full control of the project.

On the American side, William T. Hurtz was hired at the recommendation of Thomas and Johnston, and on the Japanese side, Masami Hata, who had experience in full animation films at Sanrio, was hired as the director. Many Disney Studio animators including Ken Anderson and Leo Salkin worked on individual sequences, and John Canemaker, Corny Cole, and Brian Froud provided visual development. Frank Thomas, Oliver Johnston and Paul Julian consulted to the production.

The world-famous Sherman Brothers (Richard M. Sherman and Robert B. Sherman) were hired to write the songs for Nemo. This was their first and only anime film, though not their first animated film; the pair had previously worked on most notably Disney's Mary Poppins in 1964 and several other projects for Disney, including The Jungle Book, the Peanuts animated musical Snoopy Come Home, and Hanna-Barbera's Charlotte's Web.

The film was completed in 1988 and released in Japan in 1989 and in the United States in 1992, but failed at the box office. Fujioka took responsibility for the film and left TMS, giving up all rights to the company, and retired from the animation industry before his death on March 30, 1996.

== Music ==
The award-winning Sherman Brothers wrote the songs for Little Nemo: Adventures in Slumberland.

Original songs performed in the film include:

No.	Title	Performer(s)	Length
1.	"Little Nemo"	Melissa Manchester
2.	"Slumberland"	Melissa Manchester
3.	"Etiquette"	Gabriel Damon, René Auberjonois, Kathleen Freeman, Michael Sheehan, June Foray, Gregg Berger & Chorus
4.	"The Boomps Song"	Neil Ross, Alan Oppenheimer, Sidney Miller & Michael Bell
5.	"Slumberland Princess"	Laura Mooney

== Release ==
The Japanese cut was released in Japan on July 15, 1989. In a summer that included strong competition, including Studio Ghibli's Kiki's Delivery Service, which was ironically directed by one of the animators who left the production of this film, it grossed ¥0.9 billion (US$10 million) in its release and was considered a box-office flop, against a budget of around ¥3 billion (US$35 million).

The English dub was released three years later in the United States in 579 theaters on August 21, 1992, through Hemdale Film Corporation. 11 minutes were cut in order to secure a family-friendly "G" rating by Motion Picture Association of America. This version's opening credits were shortened, as a result, the opening song plays during the opening scene.

=== Critical reception ===
It received generally mixed reviews from publications including The New York Times. Roger Ebert gave the film 2 out of 4 stars, though on a positive note, he wrote: "Little Nemo is an interesting if not a great film, with some jolly characters, some cheerful songs, and some visual surprises."

On the review aggregator Rotten Tomatoes, Little Nemo: Adventures in Slumberland has an approval rating of 55%, based on 29 reviews, with an average score of 5.8/10. The website's critical consensus reads: "Despite a creative team and source material that should be any animation fan's fantasy, uneven craft and an inert story keep Little Nemo from being a proper dream come true."

=== Box office ===
In its opening weekend in the United States, Nemo made about $407,695 with a total US gross of approximately $1,368,000. It won the "Audience Award" at Amsterdam's 1992 Cinekid Festival and was nominated for "Best Animated Feature" at the 1993 Annie Awards.

In March 2005, Little Nemo was given a very limited re-release in Denver, Seattle, Atlanta, Austin, Houston, and other cities in the US. This was through Regal Entertainment Group's Regal Cinemas, Edwards Theatres, and United Artists Theatres as part of a Kidtoon Films family matinées promotion. It was only shown on weekends.

=== Aftermath ===
After the film's release, Fujioka decided to retire from the animation business. TMS, having to recoup Little Nemo's losses, increased production on locally based anime programs and became highly involved in animation for Western-based productions, including Tiny Toon Adventures, Animaniacs, and Batman. Since the early 2000s, TMS has no longer supplied animation services to Western studios due to increasingly demanding costs. The studio still does features, but primarily films spinning off existing anime properties, which include the likes of Anpanman and Detective Conan.

=== Home media ===
US DVD cover

The film was released on VHS through Hemdale Home Video, Inc. on March 2, 1993. Nemo became the #4 best-selling children's title of 1993, with 1.5 million copies sold.

On October 5, 2004, Little Nemo was released on DVD through Funimation (under the Our Time Family Entertainment name, and under license from TMS, which had regained North American rights to the film after Hemdale closed). All of the cuts that were made in the 1992 release were restored in this DVD, bringing the runtime of the film to the full 95 minutes, resulting in the DVD being released unrated instead. Only the English dub was included.

After the title went out of print, Little Nemo could be seen selling anywhere from $80 to $200 US for a sealed copy (usually DVD) on Internet sites such as Amazon and eBay. Funimation's DVD was re-released as a budget title from Echo Bridge Home Entertainment on January 27, 2009, appearing commonly in department stores in low-price bargain bins. Then on September 20, 2011, after Echo Bridge's reissue went out of print, it was released again on DVD by Discotek Media, but that release is dub-only. On November 6, 2012, Discotek released a Blu-ray of the film containing the Japanese dub and original English audio tracks and included bonus features such as the pilot films from 1984 and 1987.

On March 2, 2016, TMS Entertainment's official YouTube channel uploaded the original 95-minute film version with English dub.

=== Video games ===
After the Japanese release, but before the US release, Capcom developed an NES game titled Little Nemo: The Dream Master, which was released in late 1990. An arcade game, also by Capcom and titled Nemo, was developed that same year.
