= Little Nemo =

American 20th century comic strip

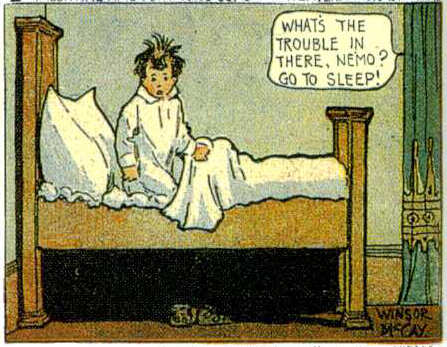
- Nemo in bed where he awoke at the end of each strip (here February 11, 1906)
- Author: Winsor McCay
- Launch date: October 15, 1905
- End date: January 9, 1927
- Alternate name: In the Land of Wonderful Dreams (1911–1914)
- Publishers: New York Herald; New York American
- Preceded by: Dream of the Rarebit Fiend

Little Nemo is a fictional character created by American cartoonist Winsor McCay. He originated in an early comic strip by McCay, Dream of the Rarebit Fiend, before receiving his own spin-off series, Little Nemo in Slumberland. The full-page weekly strip depicted Nemo having fantastic dreams that were interrupted by his awakening in the final panel. The strip is considered McCay's masterpiece for its experiments with the form of the comics page, its use of color and perspective, its timing and pacing, the size and shape of its panels, and its architectural and other details.

Little Nemo in Slumberland ran in the New York Herald from October 15, 1905 until July 23, 1911. The strip was renamed In the Land of Wonderful Dreams when McCay brought it to William Randolph Hearst's New York American, where it ran from September 3, 1911 until July 26, 1914. When McCay returned to the Herald in 1924, he revived the strip, and it ran under its original title from August 3, 1924 until January 9, 1927, when McCay returned to Hearst.

== Concept ==
A weekly fantasy adventure, Little Nemo in Slumberland featured the young Nemo ("No one" in Latin) who dreamed himself into wondrous predicaments from which he awoke in bed in the last panel.

The first episode (Note: Wikimedia Commons has a file available for this strip (October 15, 1905).) begins with a command from King Morpheus of Slumberland to a minion to collect Nemo. Nemo was to be the playmate of Slumberland's Princess, but it took months of adventures before Nemo finally arrived. A green, cigar-chewing clown named Flip was determined to disturb Nemo's sleep with a top hat emblazoned with the words "Wake Up". Nemo and Flip eventually become companions and are joined by an African Imp whom Flip finds in the Candy Islands. The group travels far and wide, from shanty towns to Mars, to Jack Frost's palace, to the bizarre architecture and distorted funhouse-mirror illusions of Befuddle Hall.

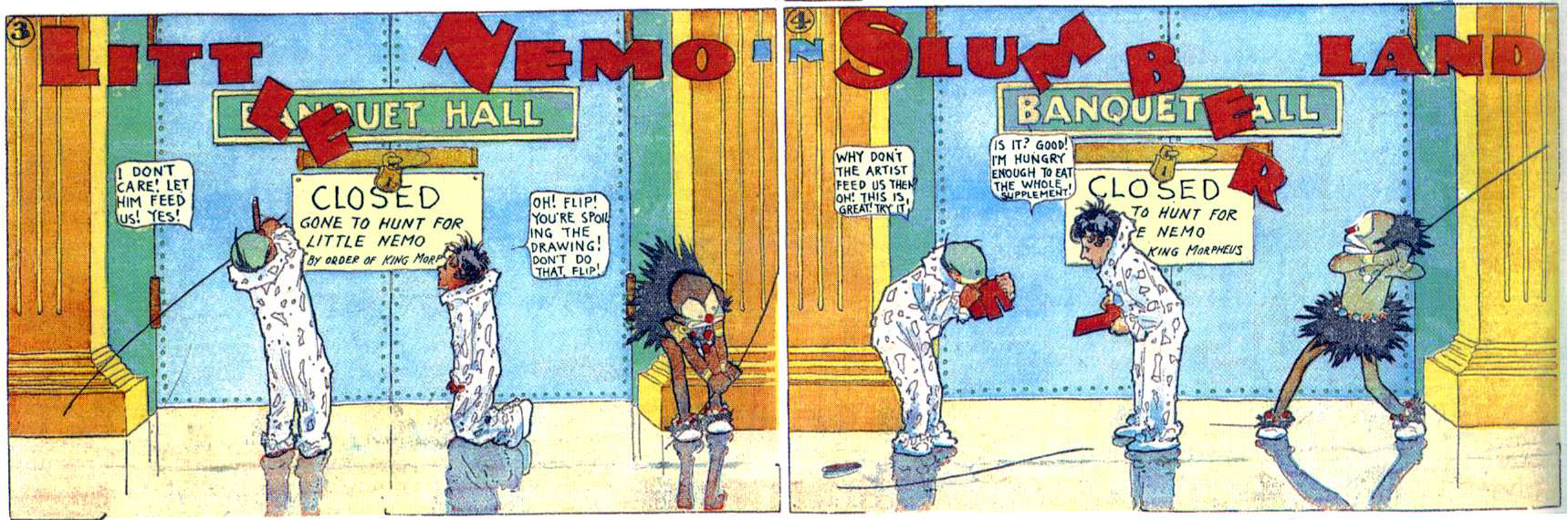
Flip, Nemo and Impie breaking the fourth wall by breaking apart the panel's outlines and eating the letters of the title

The strip shows McCay's understanding of dream psychology, particularly of dream fears—falling, drowning, impalement. This dream world has its own moral code, perhaps difficult to understand. Breaking it has terrible consequences as when Nemo ignores instructions not to touch Queen Crystalette who inhabits a cave of glass. Overcome with his infatuation, he causes her and her followers to shatter and awakens with "the groans of the dying guardsmen still ringing in his ears". (Note: Wikimedia Commons has a file available for this strip (November 11, 1905).)

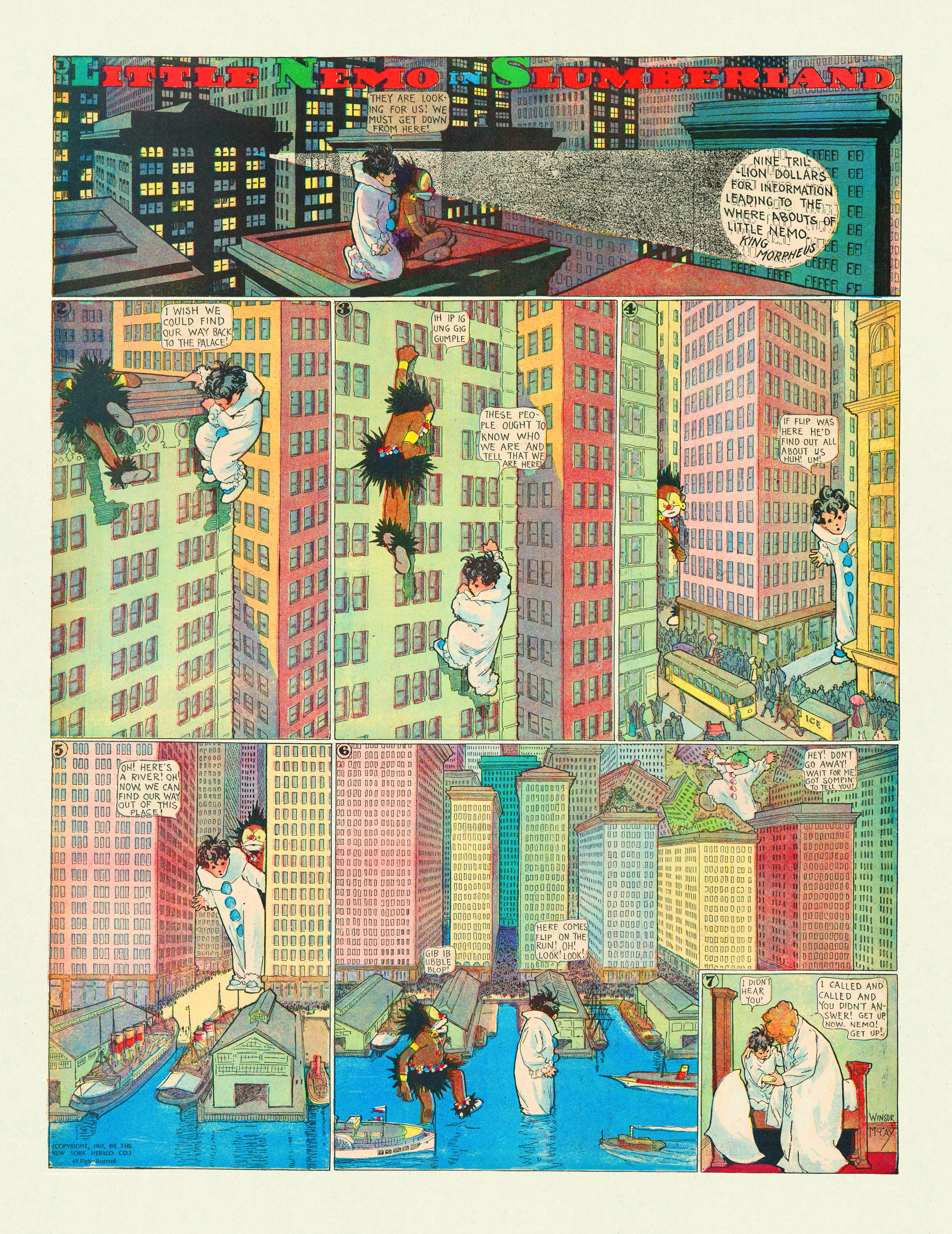
Nemo and the Little Imp explore the city as giants, September 9, 1907.

Although the strip began October 15, 1905, with King Morpheus, ruler of Slumberland, making his first attempt to bring Little Nemo to his realm. Nemo did not get into Slumberland until March 4, 1906. Due to Flip's interfering, Nemo did not get to see the Princess until July 8. His dream quest is always interrupted, either by his falling out of bed, Nemo suddenly waking up, or by his parents forcing him to wake up.

On July 12, 1908, McCay made a major change of direction: Flip visits Nemo and tells him that he has had his uncle destroy Slumberland (it had been dissolved before, into day, but this time it appeared to be permanent). After this, Nemo's dreams take place in his home town, though Flip—and a curious-looking boy named the Professor—accompany him. These adventures range from the down-to-earth to Rarebit-fiend type fantasy; one very commonplace dream had the Professor pelting people with snowballs. The famous "walking bed" story was in this period. Slumberland continued to make sporadic appearances until it returned for good on December 26, 1909.

Story-arcs included Befuddle Hall, a voyage to Mars (with a well-realized Martian civilization), and a trip around the world (including a tour of New York City).

== Style ==
McCay experimented with the form of the comics page, its timing and pacing, the size and shape of its panels, perspective, and architectural and other detail. From the second installment, McCay had the panel sizes and layouts conform to the action in the strip: as a forest of mushrooms grew, so did the panels, and the panels shrank as the mushrooms collapsed on Nemo. In an early Thanksgiving episode, the focal action of a giant turkey gobbling Nemo's house receives an enormous circular panel in the center of the page. McCay also accommodated a sense of proportion with panel size and shape, showing elephants and dragons at a scale the reader could feel in proportion to the regular characters. McCay controlled narrative pacing through variation or repetition, as with equally-sized panels whose repeated layouts and minute differences in movement conveyed a feeling of buildup to some climactic action.

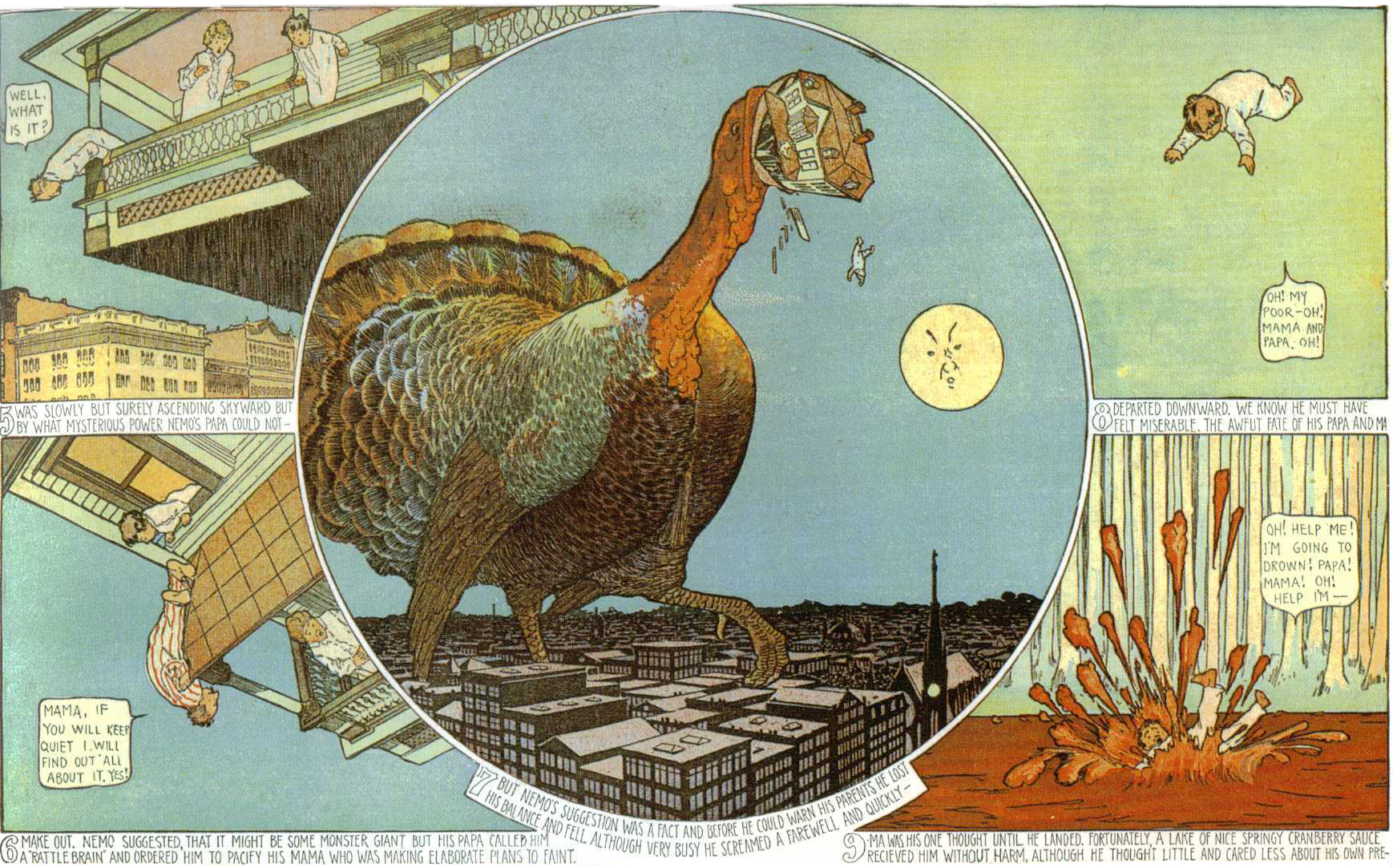
McCay sized and placed panels to conform to the action they contained (November 25, 1905). (Note: Wikimedia Commons has a file available for The full version of this strip (November 26, 1905).)

In his familiar Art Nouveau-influenced style, McCay outlined his characters in heavy blacks. Slumberland's ornate architecture was reminiscent of the architecture designed by McKim, Mead & White for the 1893 World's Columbian Exposition in Chicago, as well as Luna Park and Dreamland in Coney Island, and the Parisian Luxembourg Palace.

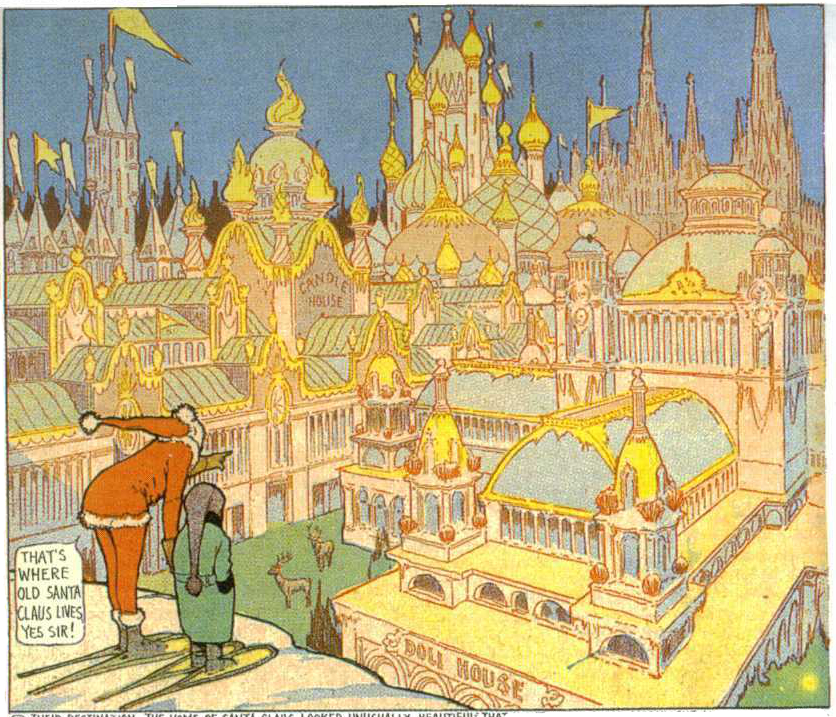
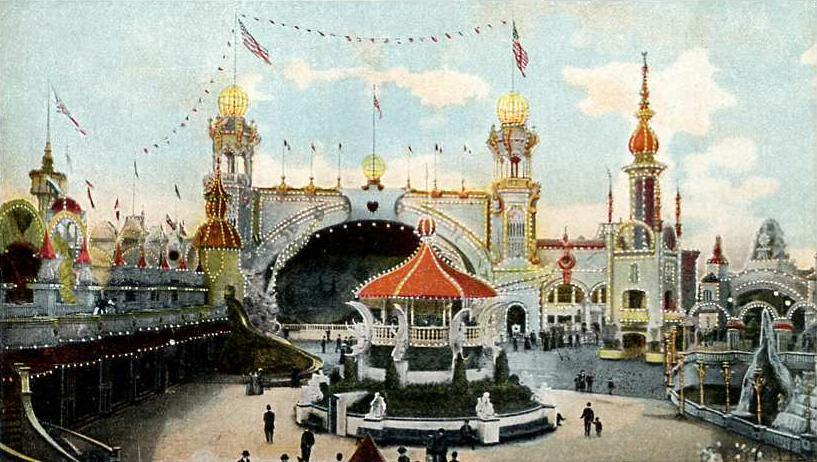
Nemo's ornate architecture was inspired by McCay's memories of the 1893 World's Columbian Exposition in Chicago, and his experience working at Coney Island (Luna Park pictured).

McCay made imaginative use of color, sometimes changing the backgrounds' or characters' colors from panel to panel in a psychedelic imitation of a dream experience. The colors were enhanced by the careful attention and advanced Ben Day lithographic process employed by the Herald's printing staff. McCay annotated the Nemo pages for the printers with the precise color schemes he wanted.

For the first five months the pages were accompanied with captions beneath them, and at first the captions were numbered. In contrast to the high level of skill in the artwork, the dialogue in the speech balloons is crude, sometimes approaching illegibility, and "disfigur[ing McCay's] otherwise flawless work", according to critic R. C. Harvey. The level of effort and skill apparent in the title lettering highlights what seems to be the little regard for the dialogue balloons, their content, and their placement in the visual composition.

McCay used ethnic stereotypes prominently in Little Nemo, as in the ill-tempered Irishman Flip, and the nearly-mute African Impie.

== Background ==
Winsor McCay (c. 1867–71 – 1934) (Note: Different accounts have given McCay's birth year as 1867, 1869, and 1871. His birth records are not extant.) had worked prolifically as a commercial artist and cartoonist in carnivals and dime museums before he began working for newspapers and magazines in 1898. In 1903, he joined the staff of the New York Herald family of newspapers, where he had success with comic strips such as Little Sammy Sneeze (1904–06). and Dream of the Rarebit Fiend (1904–11) (Note: Rarebit Fiend was revived between 1911 and 1913 under other titles, such as Midsummer Day Dreams and It Was Only a Dream.)

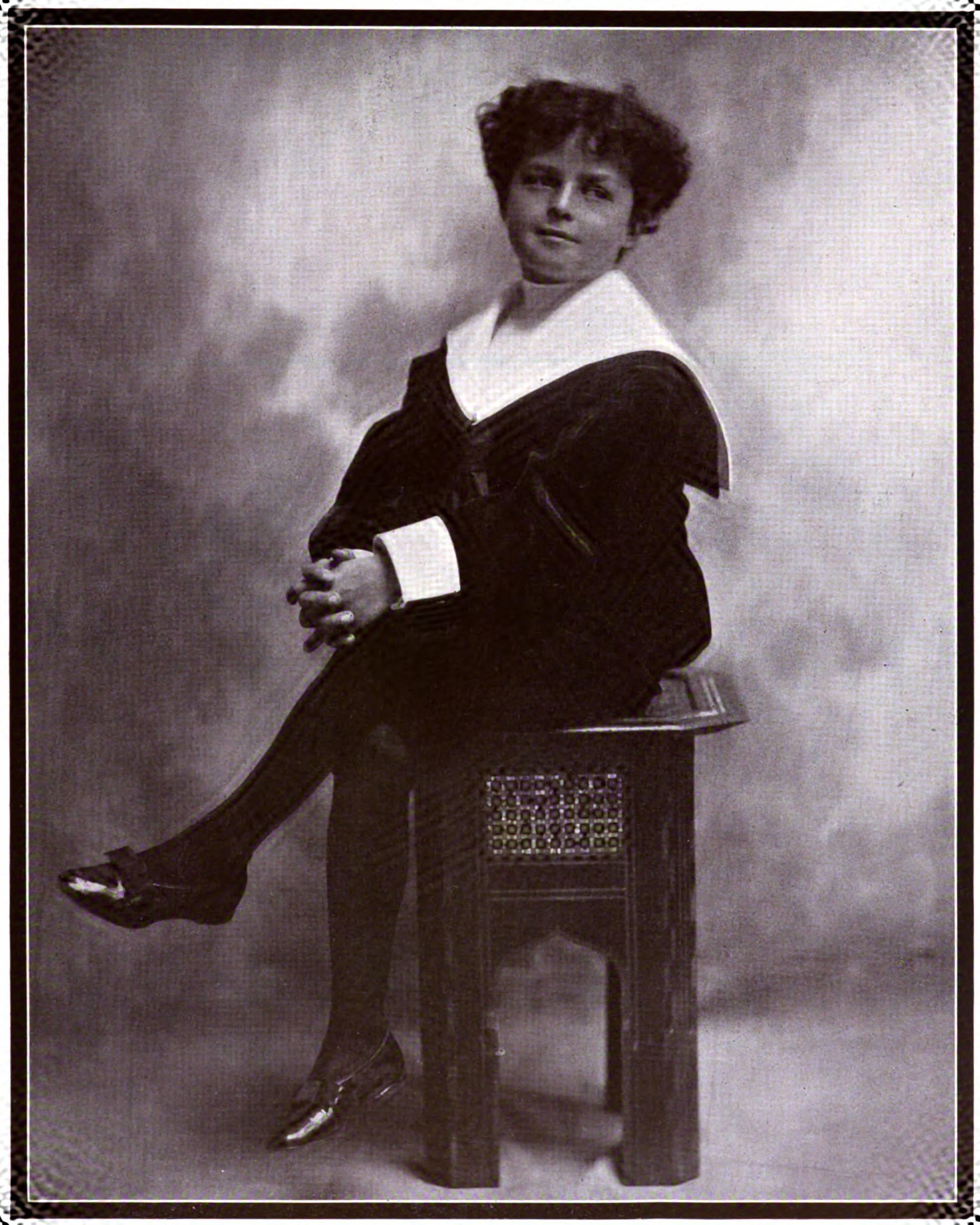
Winsor McCay's son Robert served as the model for Nemo.

In 1905, McCay got "an idea from the Rarebit Fiend to please the little folk". That October, the full-page Sunday strip Little Nemo in Slumberland debuted in the Herald. Considered McCay's masterpiece, its child protagonist, whose appearance was based on McCay's son Robert, had fabulous dreams that would be interrupted with his awakening in the last panel. McCay experimented with the form of the comics page, its timing and pacing, the size and shape of its panels, perspective, architectural and other detail.

== Publication history ==
Little Nemo in Slumberland debuted on the last page of the Sunday comics section of The New York Herald newspaper, on October 15, 1905. The full-page, color comic strip ran until July 23, 1911. In spring 1911, McCay moved to William Randolph Hearst's New York American and took Little Nemo's characters with him. The Herald held the strip's copyright, but McCay won a lawsuit that allowed him to continue using the characters. In the American, the strip ran under the title In the Land of Wonderful Dreams. The Herald was unsuccessful in finding another cartoonist to continue the original strip.

McCay left Hearst in May 1924 and returned to the Herald Tribune. He began Little Nemo in Slumberland afresh on August 3 of that year. The new strip displayed the virtuoso technique of the old, but the panels were laid out in an unvarying grid. Nemo took a more passive role in the stories, and there was no continuity. The strip came to an end in January 1927, as it was not popular with readers. Hearst executives had been trying to convince McCay to return to the American, and they succeeded in 1927. Due to the lack of the 1920s Nemo's success, the Herald Tribune signed over all copyrights to the strip to McCay for one dollar.

In 1937, McCay's son Robert attempted to carry on his father's legacy by reviving Little Nemo. Comic book packager Harry "A" Chesler's syndicate announced a Sunday and daily Nemo strip, credited to "Winsor McCay, Jr." Robert also drew a comic-book version for Chesler called Nemo in Adventureland featuring grown-up versions of Nemo and the Princess. Neither project lasted long. Production continued on both after the syndicate was closed in 1938, being utilized in various comic books including Cocomalt Comics and Blue Ribbon, published by MLJ Publications (later Archie Publications). Chesler closed his shop (the first of several times) around 1940. Street & Smith ran Little Nemo in 1942 in Shadow Comics. In 1945, McCay was again with Chesler’s shop, producing Little Nemo in Adventureland for Red Seal and Punch Comics until 1947, when the shop closed down for the final time.

In 1947, Robert and fabric salesman Irving Mendelsohn organized the McCay Feature Syndicate, Inc. to revive the original Nemo strip from McCay's original art, modified to fit the size of modern newspaper pages. This revival also did not last. The McCay-Richardson Syndicate distributed this version from approximately March to December 1947.

In 1966, cartoonist Woody Gelman discovered the original artwork for many Little Nemo strips at a cartoon studio where McCay's son Bob had worked. In 1973, Gelman published a collection of Little Nemo strips in Italy. His collection of McCay originals is preserved at the Billy Ireland Cartoon Library & Museum at Ohio State University.

In 2005, collector Peter Maresca self-published a 21-×-16-inch (53 × 41 cm) volume of Nemo Sundays as Little Nemo in Slumberland: So Many Splendid Sundays! via his Sunday Press Books. The volume was large enough to reproduce the pages at their original size, as they appeared in newspapers. Restoration work took Maresca between five and twenty hours per page. A second volume, Little Nemo in Slumberland: Many More Splendid Sundays!, appeared in 2008.

== Adaptations ==
=== Theatre ===
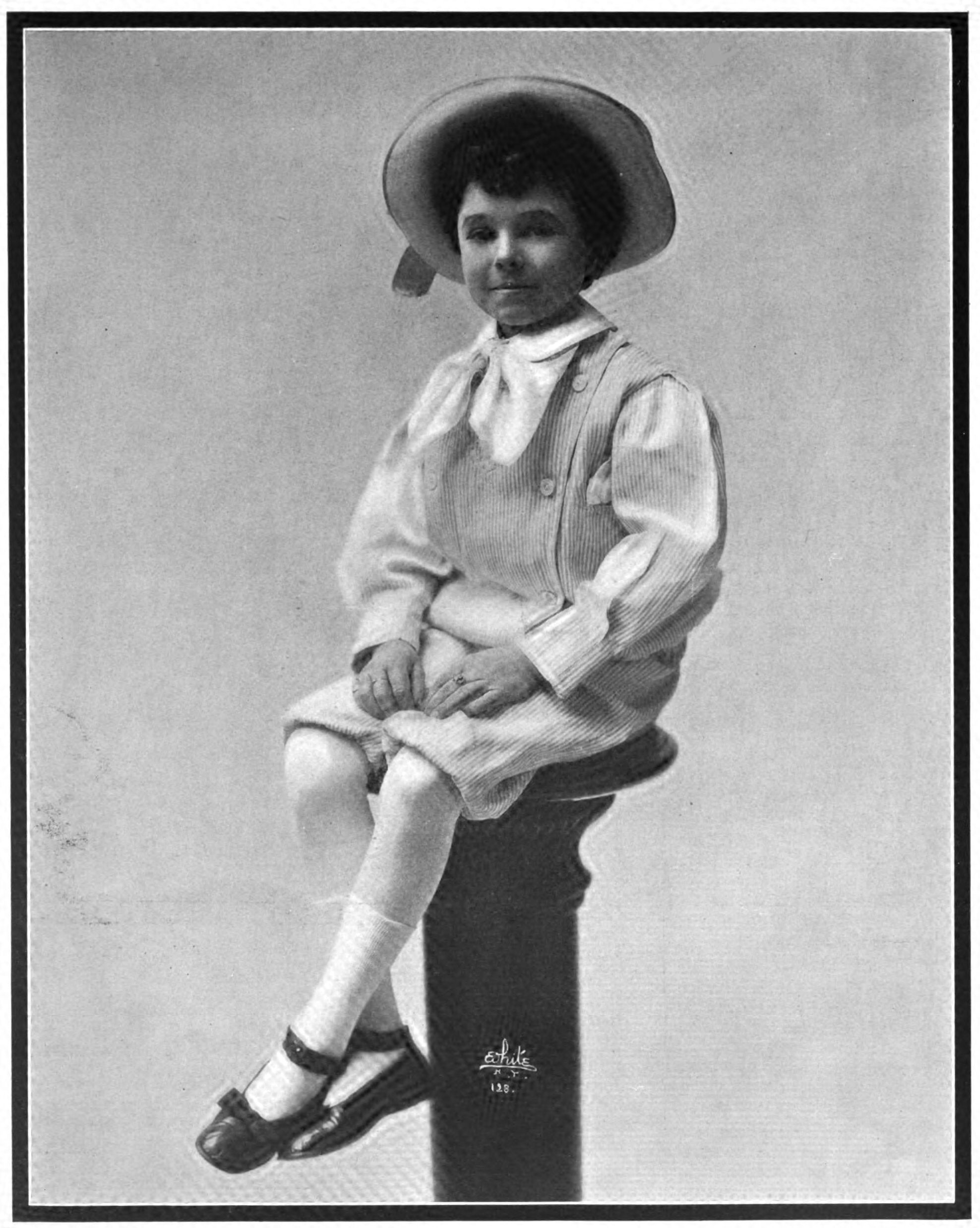
Master Gabriel as the star of the 1908 Little Nemo musical

As early as 1905, several abortive attempts were made to put Little Nemo on stage. In summer 1907, Marcus Klaw and A. L. Erlanger announced they would put on an extravagant Little Nemo show for an unprecedented $100,000, with a score by Victor Herbert and lyrics by Harry B. Smith. It starred Gabriel Weigel, an actor with dwarfism, as Nemo, Joseph Cawthorn as Dr. Pill, and Billy B. Van as Flip. Reviews were positive, and it played to sold-out houses in New York. It went on the road for two seasons. McCay brought his vaudeville act to each city where Little Nemo played. When a Keith circuit (Note: Keith had partnered with Proctor in 1906.) refused to let McCay perform in Boston without a new act, McCay switched to the William Morris circuit, with a $100-a-week raise. In several cities, McCay brought his son, who sat on a small throne dressed as Nemo as publicity.

As part of an improvised story, Cawthorn introduced a mythical creature he called a "Whiffenpoof". The word stuck with the public, and became the name of a hit song and a singing group. One reviewer of the 1908 operetta gave a paragraph of praise to the comic hunting tales presented in a scene in which three hunters are trying to outdo each other with hunting stories about the "montimanjack", the "peninsula", and the "whiffenpoof". He calls it "one of the funniest yarns ever spun" and compares it favorably to Lewis Carroll's The Hunting of the Snark. One source indicates that the dialogue in fact began as an ad lib by actor Joseph Cawthorn, covering for some kind of backstage problem during a performance. The whiffenpoof is also referred in one of the Little Nemo comic strips published in 1909 (April 11). After being held down by nine policemen during a hysteria crisis, Nemo's father tells the doctor: "Just keep those whiffenpoofs away. Will you?". The strip for September 26 starts with a hunt for whiffenpoofs but instead the hunters find a "montemaniac" and a "peninsula".

Despite the show's success, it failed to make back its investment due to its enormous expenses, and came to an end in December 1910. In mid-2012 Toronto-based theatre company Frolick performed an adaptation of the strip into Adventures in Slumberland, a multimedia show featuring puppets large and small and a score that included as a refrain "Wake Up Little Nemo", set to the tune of The Everly Brothers' 1957 hit "Wake Up Little Susie". Talespinner Children's Theatre in Cleveland, OH produced a scaled-down, "colorful and high-energy 45-minute" adaptation in 2013, Adventures In Slumberland by David Hansen.

In March 2017, a short, one-act adaptation of the "Little Nemo" adventures was staged at Fordham University in New York City. The play, simply entitled Little Nemo in Slumberland, was written by Aladdin Lee Grant Rutledge Collar, and directed by student Peter McNally. The six person cast, as well as creative team, consisted of students and alums at the university.

=== Film ===
==== Animation ====
Little Nemo (1911)

McCay played an important role in the early history of animation. In 1911, he completed his first film, Winsor McCay, the Famous Cartoonist of the N.Y. Herald and His Moving Comics (also known as Little Nemo), first in theatres and then as part of his vaudeville act. McCay made the 4,000 rice-paper drawings for the animated portion of the film. The animated portion took up about four minutes of the film's total length. Photography was done at the Vitagraph Studios under the supervision of animation pioneer James Stuart Blackton. During the live-action portion of the film, McCay bets his colleagues he can make his drawings move. He wins the bet by animating his Little Nemo characters, who shapeshift and transform.

A joint American-Japanese feature-length film Little Nemo: Adventures in Slumberland was released in Japan in 1989 and in the United States in August 1992 from Hemdale Film Corporation, with contributions by Ray Bradbury, Chris Columbus, and Moebius, and music by the Sherman Brothers. The story tells of a quest by Nemo and friends to rescue King Morpheus from the Nightmare King. The Princess is named Princess Camille, Flip has a bird companion named Flap, and Nemo has a pet flying squirrel named Icarus. It received mixed reviews from critics, where it earned $11.4 million on a $35 million budget and was a box-office bomb, but it sold well on home video and has since developed into a cult film.

==== Live-Action ====
In 1984, Arnaud Sélignac produced and directed a Live-Action film titled Nemo, a.k.a. Dream One, starring Jason Connery, Harvey Keitel, and Carole Bouquet. It involves a little boy called Nemo, who wears pajamas and travels to a fantasy world, but otherwise the connection to McCay's strip is a loose one. The fantasy world is a dark and dismal beach, and Nemo encounters characters from other works of fiction rather than those from the original strip. Instead of Flip or the Princess, Nemo meets Zorro, Alice, and Jules Verne's Nautilus (which was led by Captain Nemo).

A live-action film adaptation, Slumberland, directed by Francis Lawrence, was released in November 2022. It features a gender-swapped version of the title character played by Marlow Barkley. Jason Momoa stars as a radically altered version of Flip, who is described as a "nine-foot tall creature that is half-man, half-beast, has shaggy fur and long curved tusks". The plot centers on Nemo and Flip traveling to Slumberland in search of the former's father.

=== Opera ===
The Sarasota Opera commissioned composer Daron Hagen and librettist J. D. McClatchy to create an opera based on Little Nemo. Two casts of children alternated performances when it debuted in November 2012. The dreamlike nonlinear story told of Nemo, the Princess, and their comrades trying to prevent the Emperor of Sol and the Guardian of Dawn from bringing daylight to Slumberland. Special effects and shifting backgrounds were produced with projections onto a scaffolding of boxes. The work was first performed on November 10 and 11, by members of the Sarasota Opera, Sarasota Youth Opera, Sarasota Prep Chorus, The Sailor Circus and students from Booker High school.

=== Video games ===
In 1990, Capcom produced a video game for the NES, titled Little Nemo: The Dream Master (known as Pajama Hero Nemo in Japan), a licensed game based on the 1989 film. The film would not see a US release until 1992, two years after the game's Japanese release, so the game is often thought to be a standalone adaptation of Little Nemo, not related to the film. An arcade game called simply Nemo was also released in 1990. In 2021, a new game, titled Little Nemo and the Nightmare Fiends based on the original comic strip was launched on Kickstarter. It is developed by Chris Totten of Pie For Breakfast Studios and Benjamin Cole of PXLPLZ. In 2022, a new game, titled Little Nemo and the Guardians of Slumberland based on the original comic strip was launched on Kickstarter. It is developed by Dave Mauro of DIE SOFT.

=== Other media ===
Throughout the years, various pieces of Little Nemo merchandise have been produced. In 1941, Rand, McNally & Co. published a Little Nemo children's storybook. Little Nemo in Slumberland in 3-D was released by Blackthorne Publishing in 1987; this reprinted Little Nemo issues with 3-D glasses. A set of 30 Little Nemo postcards was available through Stewart Tabori & Chang in 1996. In 1993, as promotion for the 1989 animated film, Hemdale produced a Collector's Set which includes a VHS movie, illustrated storybook, and cassette soundtrack. In 2001, Dark Horse Comics released a Little Nemo statue and tin lunchbox.

== Cultural influence ==
Little Nemo itself is influenced by children stories in general, and some French comic pages in particular. Since its publishing, Little Nemo has had an influence on other artists, including Peter Newell (The Naps of Polly Sleepyhead), Frank King (Bobby Make-Believe), Clare Briggs (Danny Dreamer) or George McManus (Nibsy the Newsboy in Funny Fairyland). Through the Paris edition of the New York Herald, his influence reached France and other European countries.

In children's literature, Maurice Sendak said that this strip inspired his book In the Night Kitchen, and William Joyce included several elements from Little Nemo in his children's book Santa Calls, including appearances by Flip and the walking bed. Another tribute to Little Nemo is the comic, then made into a short film, Little Remo in Pinchmeland, by Ellen Duthie and Daniela Martagón.

The character and themes from the comic strip Little Nemo were used in a song "Scenes from a Night's Dream" written by Tony Banks and Phil Collins of the progressive rock group Genesis on their 1978 recording, ...And Then There Were Three....

A progressive rock group from Germany named Scara Brae also recorded a musical impression of the comic on their rare self-titled disc from 1981 (the track was actually recorded 2 years earlier). Their concept piece was revived on the second album by the Greek band Anger Department, titled The Strange Dreams of a Rarebit Fiend, again after a McCay-comic. Their Little Nemo was chosen for a theatre play, which was suggested for the cultural program for the Olympic Games in 2004.

In 1984, Italian comic artist Vittorio Giardino started producing a number of stories under the title Little Ego, a parodic adaptation of Little Nemo, in the shape of adult-oriented erotic comics. Brian Bolland's early comic strip Little Nympho in Slumberland employed a similar technique.

The bar in A Nightmare on Elm Street 3: Dream Warriors is called 'Little Nemo's'.

The strip influenced Alan Moore, in Miracleman #4, when the Miracleman family end up in a palace called "Sleepy Town", which has imagery similar to Little Nemo's. In Moore (and J.H. Williams III)'s Promethea, a more direct pastiche – "Little Margie in Misty Magic Land" – showed Moore's inspiration and debt to McCay's landmark 1905 strip. Little Nemo makes a visual cameo in Volume 4, issue #4 of Moore and Kevin O'Neill's League of Extraordinary Gentleman, during the Shakespearean Theatre scene that includes many other cameos.

The Sandman comics and graphic novel series occasionally references Little Nemo as well. Examples include The Sandman: The Doll's House, where an abused child escapes into dreams styled after McCay's comics and using a similar "wake-up" mechanism, and The Sandman: Book of Dreams (pub. 1996), which features George Alec Effinger's short "Seven Nights in Slumberland" (where Nemo interacts with Neil Gaiman's characters The Endless).

In 1989, teen comic book Power Pack ran an issue (#47) which paid direct homage to one of McCay's Nemo storylines, featuring a castle that was drawn sideways and Katie Power re-enacting a classic Nemo panel with a sideways-drawn hallway that served as a bottomless pit with the line "Don't fall in, y'hear?"

The video of the 1989 song for "Runnin' Down a Dream" by Tom Petty is directly inspired by Little Nemo in Slumberland by Winsor McCay, which features a drawing style reminiscent of McCay's and showing Petty and a character who resembles Flip travelling through Slumberland.

The band Queensrÿche paid homage to Little Nemo in their 1990 video Silent Lucidity.

In 1994–1995, French artist Moebius wrote the story to a sequel comic series, Little Nemo, drawn by Bruno Marchand in two albums. In 2000–2002, Marchand continued the story with two additional albums.

In 2006, electronic artist Daedelus used Little Nemo artwork for his album Denies the Day's Demise.

The comic strip Cul de Sac includes a strip-within-the-strip, Little Neuro, a parody of Little Nemo. Neuro is a little boy who hardly ever leaves his bed.

In 2009, the Pittsburgh ToonSeum established its NEMO Award, given to notable individuals "for excellence in the cartoon arts". Recipients to date include veteran comic-book artist, Ron Frenz, editorial and comic-strip artist, Dick Locher, cartoonist and comics historian, Trina Robbins, and comics artist, editorial cartoonist and artists' rights advocate Jerry Robinson.

On October 15, 2012, celebrating the 107th anniversary of the first Little Nemo story, Google displayed an interactive animated "Google Doodle" called "Little Nemo in Google-land" on its homepage. The doodle showed a typical Little Nemo adventure through a series of panels, each featuring a letter from the word "Google". The doodle also ends in the same way as the comic strips, with Nemo falling from his bed.

Eric Shanower and Gabriel Rodriguez revived the characters in 2014 in an IDW comic book series entitled Little Nemo: Return to Slumberland. That same year, Locust Moon Press released a new anthology and Taschen published the complete series (1905–1926).

A comic strip Mutts has one of the strip's recurring characters, a naughty squirrel, "bonking" Nemo with an acorn, and wishing him "sweet dreams".

== Legacy ==
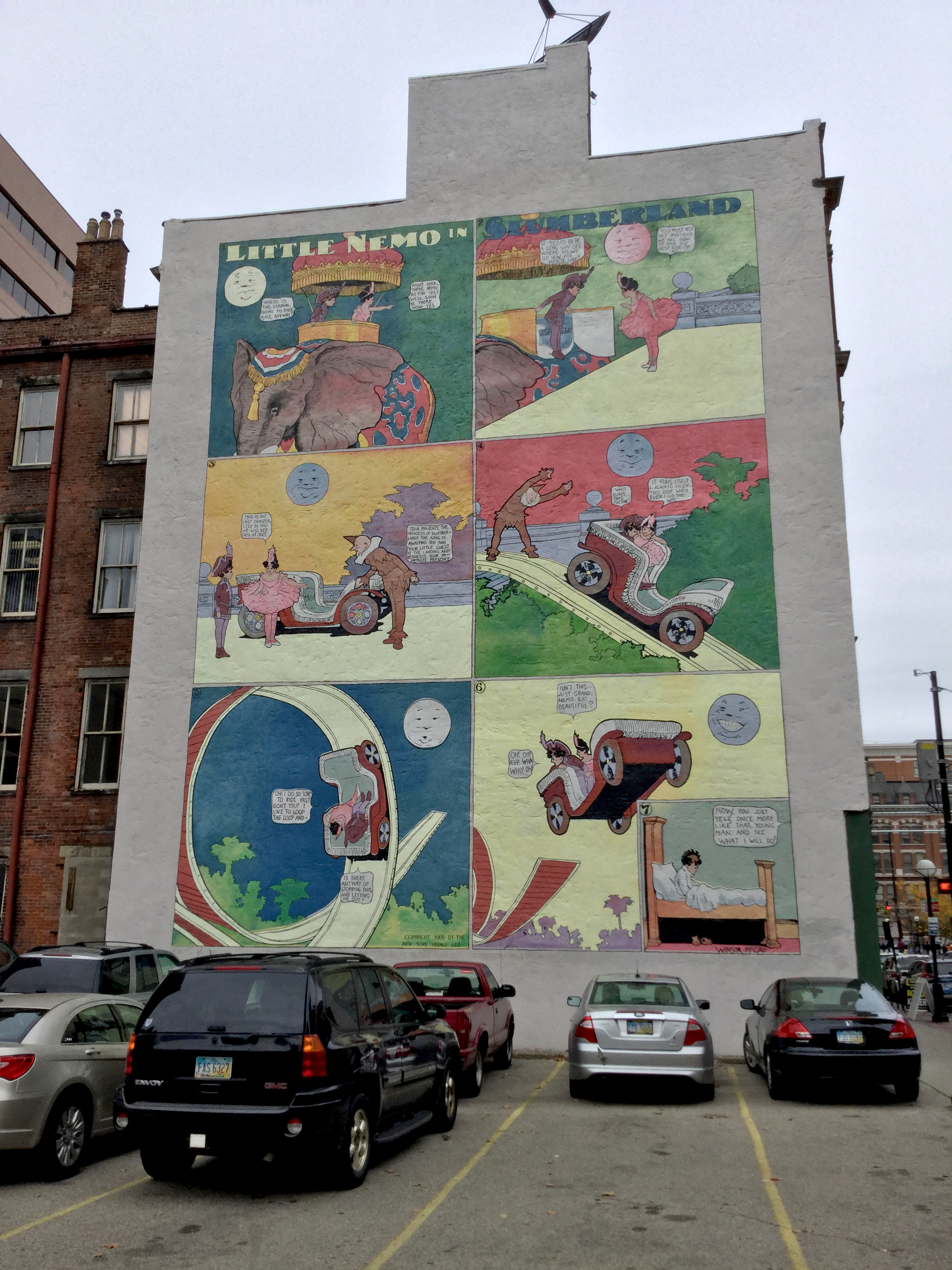
Mural of a Little Nemo in Slumberland comic in downtown Cincinnati, Ohio

Comics historian R. C. Harvey has called McCay "the first original genius of the comic strip medium". Harvey claims that McCay's contemporaries lacked the skill to continue with his innovations, so that they were left for future generations to rediscover and build upon. Cartoonist Robert Crumb called McCay a "genius" and one of his favorite cartoonists. Art Spiegelman's In the Shadow of No Towers (2004) appropriated some of McCay's imagery, and included a page of Little Nemo in its appendix. Federico Fellini read Little Nemo in the children's magazine Il corriere dei piccoli, and the strip was a "powerful influence" on the filmmaker, according to Fellini biographer Peter Bondanella.

McCay's original artwork has been poorly preserved. McCay insisted on having his originals returned to him, and a large collection survived him, but much of it was destroyed in a fire in the late 1930s. His wife was unsure how to handle the surviving pieces, so his son took on the responsibility and moved the collection into his own house. The family sold off some of the artwork when they were in need of cash. Responsibility for it passed to Mendelsohn, then later to daughter Marion. By the early twenty-first century, most of McCay's surviving artwork remained in family hands.
