= Little Nemo: The Dream Master =

1990 video game

- North American box art
- Developer: Capcom
- Publishers: NA/JP: Capcom; EU: Nintendo
- Producer: Tokuro Fujiwara
- Designer: Tatsuya Minami
- Programmer: Yoshito Ito
- Artists: Naoya Tomita; Natsue Ueda; Yoshifumi Onishi
- Composer: Junko Tamiya
- Platform: Nintendo Entertainment System
- Release: NA: September 1990; JP: December 7, 1990; EU: December 12, 1991
- Genre: Platform
- Mode: Single-player

Little Nemo: The Dream Master (Note: Also known as Pajama Hero Nemo (Japanese: パジャマヒーロー NEMO, Hepburn: Pajama Hīrō Nīmō) in Japan) is a 1990 platform game developed and published by Capcom for the Nintendo Entertainment System. It is based on the 1989 animated film Little Nemo: Adventures in Slumberland, which itself is based on the comic strip Little Nemo in Slumberland by Winsor McCay. The music was composed by Junko Tamiya, credited in the game as "Gonzou".

The game revolves around a young boy in his own surreal dreams as he journeys to Slumberland. Nemo can ride certain animals such as a frog, a gorilla, or a mole, by feeding them candy. Every animal has its own skills needed to complete each level. The purpose of the game is to travel to Nightmare land to rescue Morpheus, the king of Slumberland, from the clutches of the evil Nightmare King.

== Gameplay ==
Gameplay screenshot

In Little Nemo: The Dream Master, the player controls Nemo as he proceeds through side-scrolling, 2D levels. In each level, Nemo must collect a specific number of keys, that are usually scattered throughout the large levels. The number of keys needed to beat each level is not indicated to the player until reaching the exit, which has a corresponding number of locks. The player must go through each level, typically left to right, but also up and down, looking for keys.

Throughout each level, the player encounters animals, which, after being fed, will allow Nemo to use their powers. A similar game mechanic would be used in Kirby's Adventure three years later. Using the powers of some animals is necessary while others simply make the game easier. The animal's lifebars often differ from Nemo's, with some animals possessing extra health. These abilities can be essential as many challenging obstacles exist throughout the game, and enemies are virtually infinite. As such, Little Nemo is generally regarded as a very difficult game.

== Development and release ==
Little Nemo: The Dream Master was released for the Nintendo Entertainment System in the United States in September 1990. It was released in December 7, 1990 in Japan for the Family Computer.

== Reception ==
Reception

Review scores
Publication	Score
AllGame	4/5
Electronic Gaming Monthly	7/10, 8/10, 7/10, 9/10
Famitsu	27/40
GamePro	23/25
HobbyConsolas	88/100
Player One	92%
Video Games (DE)	69%
Game Zone	87/100
Hippon Super!	8/10
Mean Machines	79%
VideoGame	4/5

Little Nemo: The Dream Master on the Nintendo Entertainment System received positive reception from critics. Electronic Gaming Monthly's four reviewers described the game as "Rescue Rangers in a dream world" and praised its pastel-style graphics, concepts, gameplay, frenetic action and constant challenge. GamePro's The Unknown Gamer praised the title for its visuals, sound, gameplay, fun factor and challenge. Brazilian magazine VideoGame gave high marks to its difficulty, graphics, music and sound effects. Hobby Consolas' José Luis Sanz gave positive remarks to the colorful and high-quality visuals, sound, gameplay and originality, but noted its difficulty and criticized the scrolling for being occasionally faulty.

Player One's Christophe Delpierre highly praised Little Nemo: The Dream Master for the colorful graphics, animated characters, sound, well thought-out difficulty progression, longevity, controls and lack of sprite flickering. Mean Machines' Rob Bright and Radion Automatic disagreed with Delpierre on most points, criticizing the sprite flickering when too many objects are present on-screen, collision detection issues and numerous occurrences of instant death traps. Nevertheless, they lauded the game for its presentation, cartoon-style visuals, "cute" and "cheery" sound design, responsive controls and ability to ride animals. Video Games' Jan Barysch gave positive remarks to the title's audiovisual presentation, but noted its steep difficulty curve and criticized the controls for being somewhat unresponsive. AllGame's Christian Huey regarded it as "a wonderfully creative side-scrolling platformer", praising the cartoonish graphics and "ethereal" music, though he noted that its gameplay was basic.

=== Retrospective coverage ===
Retrospective commentaries for Little Nemo: The Dream Master have been more mixed. In 2009, IGN placed the title on their "Top 100 NES Games" list at #68, but remarked that "the game's advanced difficulty level no doubt took some unsuspecting youngsters by surprise." Similarly, Gaming Bus' Christopher Bowen wrote that Little Nemo was "punishingly difficult at times, even by NES games standards." Bowen also wrote that the game belonged in "the second tier of Capcom licensed games" alongside Adventures in the Magic Kingdom. Hardcore Gaming 101's Kurt Kalata felt that the ability to ride animals was awkward, due to each one featuring disadvantages, and criticized the key hunting gameplay portion to be annoying. Kalata also noted that its soundtrack was "fairly unremarkable" aside from certain music pieces. He ultimately regarded it to be a decent platform title. Anime News Network's Todd Ciolek felt the NES version "had greater traction" compared to its arcade counterpart, stating that the rideable animals turned each stage into a puzzle due to their abilities. Digital Trends' Steven Petite called it one of the best NES games of all time.
