= Dream of the Rarebit Fiend =

Early 20th-century American comic strip

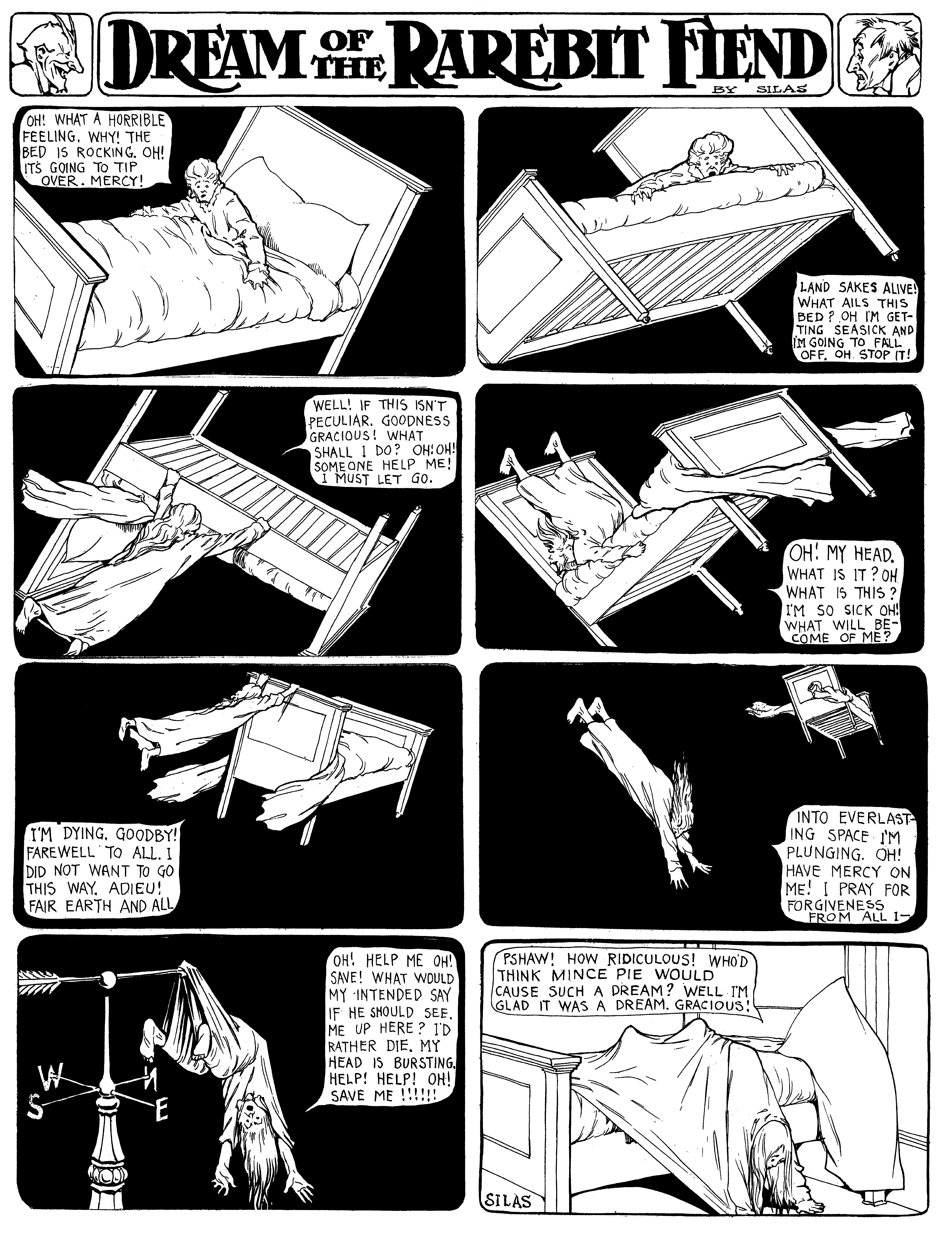
- January 28, 1905, Rarebit Fiend episode
- Author: Silas
- Launch date: September 10, 1904
- End date: c. 1925
- Alternate names: The Dream of a Lobster Fiend; Midsummer Day Dreams; It Was Only a Dream; Rarebit Reveries
- Publisher: New York Herald
- Preceded by: Little Sammy Sneeze
- Followed by: Little Nemo

Dream of the Rarebit Fiend is a newspaper comic strip by American cartoonist Winsor McCay, begun September 10, 1904. It was McCay's second successful strip, after Little Sammy Sneeze secured him a position on the cartoon staff of the New York Herald. Rarebit Fiend appeared in the Evening Telegram, a newspaper published by the Herald. For contractual reasons, McCay signed the strip with the pen name "Silas".

The strip had no continuity or recurring characters, but a recurring theme: a character has a nightmare or other bizarre dream, usually after eating a Welsh rarebit—a cheese-on-toast dish. The character awakens in the closing panel and regrets having eaten the rarebit. The dreams often reveal unflattering sides of the dreamers' psyches—their phobias, hypocrisies, discomforts, and dark fantasies. This was in great contrast to the colorful fantasy dreams in McCay's signature strip Little Nemo, which he began in 1905. Whereas children were Nemo's target audience, McCay aimed Rarebit Fiend at adults.

The popularity of Rarebit Fiend and Nemo led to McCay gaining a contract in 1911 with William Randolph Hearst's chain of newspapers with a star's salary. His editor there thought McCay's highly skilled cartooning "serious, not funny", and had McCay give up comic strips in favor of editorial cartooning. McCay revived the strip in 1923–1925 as Rarebit Reveries, of which few examples have survived.

A number of film adaptations of Rarebit Fiend have appeared, including Edwin S. Porter's live-action Dream of a Rarebit Fiend in 1906, and four pioneering animated films by McCay himself: How a Mosquito Operates in 1912, and 1921's Bug Vaudeville, The Pet, and The Flying House. The strip is said to have anticipated a number of recurring ideas in popular culture, such as marauding giant beasts damaging cities—as later popularized by King Kong and Godzilla.

== Background ==
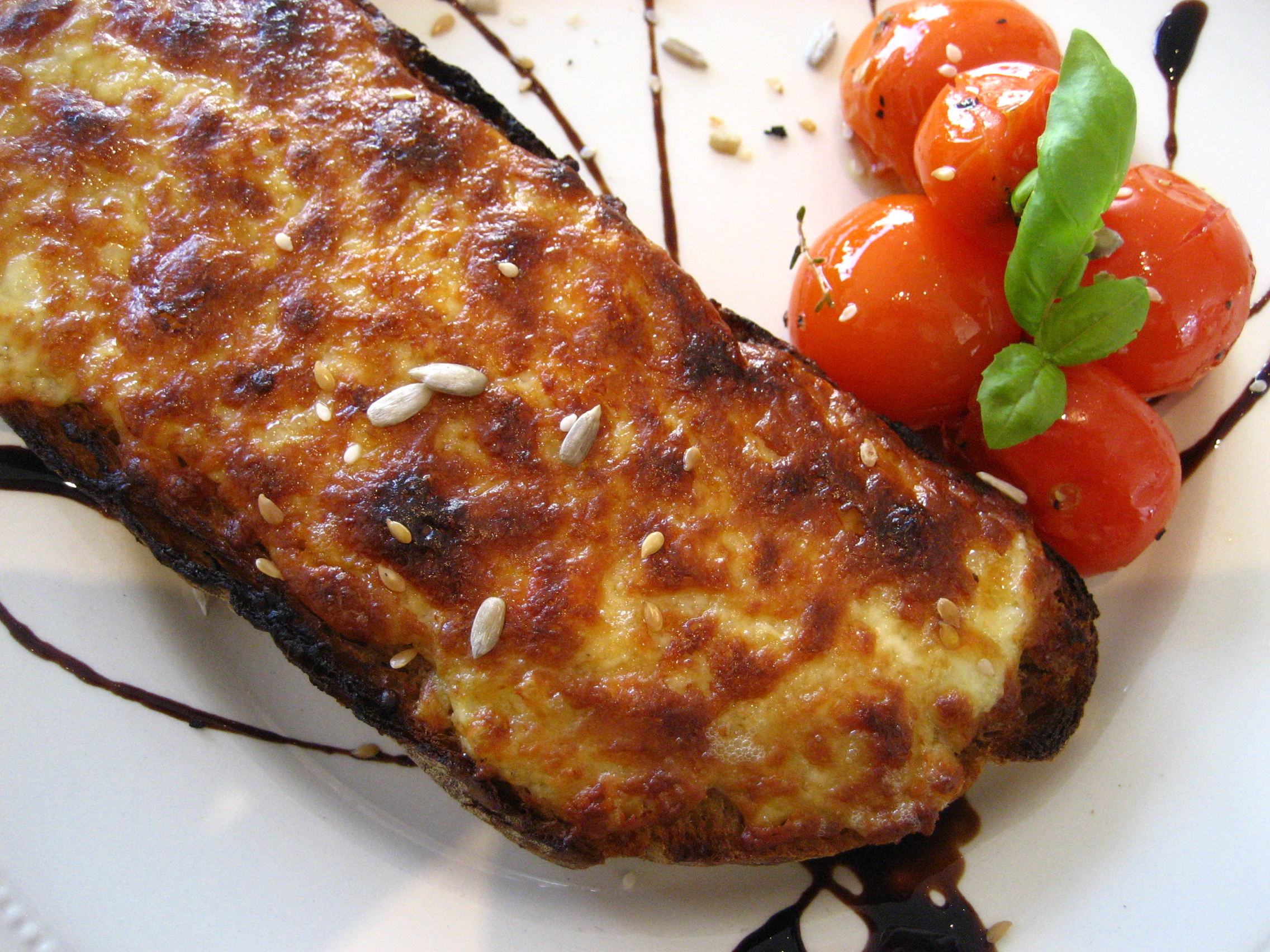
A Welsh rarebit, consisting of seasoned melted cheese on toast

Winsor McCay first produced Dream of the Rarebit Fiend in 1904, a year before the dream romps of his Little Nemo and a full generation before the artists of the Surrealist movement unleashed the unconscious on the public. The strip had no recurring characters, but followed a theme: after eating a Welsh rarebit, the day's protagonist would be subject to the darker side of his psyche. Typically, the strip would begin with an absurd situation which became more and more absurd until the Fiend—the dreamer—awakened in the final panel. Some situations were merely silly: elephants falling from the ceiling, or two women's mink coats having a fight. Other times, they could be more disturbing: characters finding themselves dismembered, buried alive from a first-person perspective or a child's mother being planted and becoming a tree. In some strips the Fiend was a spectator watching fantastic or horrible things happen to someone close to themself. The protagonists are typically, but not always, of America’s growing middle-class urban population whom McCay subjects to fears of public humiliation, or loss of social esteem or respectability, or just the uncontrollably weird nature of being.

Rarebit Fiend was the only one of McCay's strips in which he approached social or political topics, or dealt with contemporary life. He addressed religious leaders, alcoholism, homelessness, political speeches, suicide, fashion, and other topics, whereas his other strips were fantasy or had seemingly vague, timeless backgrounds. The strip referenced contemporary events such as the 1904 election of Theodore Roosevelt; the recently built Flatiron Building (1902) and St. Regis Hotel (1904) in New York City; and the Russo-Japanese War of 1904–05.

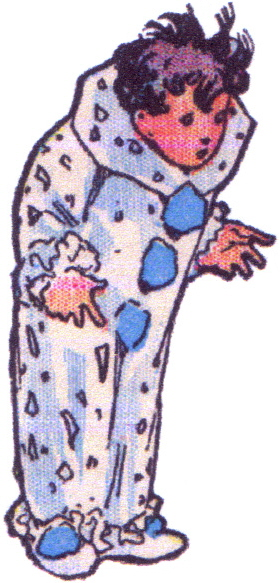
McCay introduced Little Nemo in Dream of the Rarebit Fiend.

The rarebit is a dish typically made with rich cheese thinned with ale and served melted on toast with cayenne and mustard mixed in. McCay used it despite its relative innocuousness: cultural theorist Scott Bukatman states rarebit was not the sort of dish a person would associate with having nightmares, thereby demonstrating his unfamiliarity with a belief long held, particularly in England, that the consumption of cheese—and more especially toasted cheese—was likely to cause unpleasant dreams.

McCay's most famous character, Little Nemo, first appeared in the first year of Dream of the Rarebit Fiend, on December 10, 1904. In 1905, McCay had Nemo appear in his own strip in the New York Herald. In comparison to Little Nemo, the artwork of the Rarebit Fiend strips had minimal backgrounds, and were usually done from a static perspective with the main characters often in a fixed position. The content of Rarebit Fiend played a much bigger role than it did in Little Nemo, whose focus was on beautiful visuals. The stories were self-contained, whereas the Nemo story continued from week to week. The dreams in Nemo were aimed at children, but Rarebit Fiend had adult-oriented subjects—social embarrassment, fear of dying or going insane, and so on. Some of the dreams in both strips were wish-fulfillment fantasies.

Unlike most comic strips from the time, Rarebit Fiend is not (directly) humorous or escapist. The strips highlight readers' darker selves—hypocrisies, deceitfulness, phobias, and discomfort. They offer often biting social commentary and show marital, money, and religious matters in a negative light. McCay had an interest in pushing formal boundaries, and playful self-referentiality plays a role in many of the strips; characters sometimes refer to McCay's alter-ego "Silas" or to the reader. Though frequent in Rarebit Fiend, this self-referentiality does not appear in McCay's other strips.

In contrast to the skilled artwork, the lettering in the dialogue balloons, as in McCay's other work, was awkward and could approach illegibility, especially in reproductions, where the artwork has normally been greatly reduced in size. McCay seemed to show little regard for the dialogue balloons, their content, and their placement in the composition. They tend to contain repetitive monologues expressing the increasing distress of the speakers, and show that McCay's gift was in the visual and not the verbal.

== Development ==
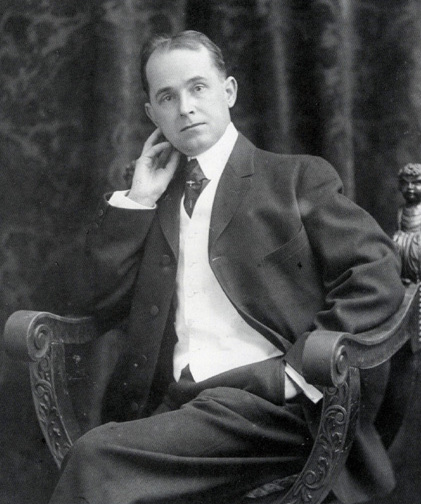
McCay's rocky marriage affected his outlook in Rarebit Fiend.

McCay began cartooning in the 1890s and had a prolific output published in magazines and newspapers. He became known for his ability to draw quickly, a talent he often employed during chalk talks on the vaudeville stage (alongside the likes of Harry Houdini and W. C. Fields). Before Dream of the Rarebit Fiend and Little Nemo, McCay had shown an interest in the topic of dreams. Some of his earlier works, numbering at least 10 regular comic strips, had titles such as Daydreams and It Was Only a Dream. McCay's were not the first dream-themed comic strips to be published: McCay's employer, the New York Herald, had printed at least three such strips, beginning with Charles Reese's Drowsy Dick in 1902. Psychoanalysis and dream interpretation had begun to enter the public consciousness with the 1900 publication of Freud's Interpretation of Dreams.

McCay first proposed a strip in which a tobacco fiend finds himself at the North Pole, unable to secure a cigarette and a light. In the last panel he awakens to find it a dream. The Herald asked McCay to make a series of the strip, but with a Welsh rarebit theme instead of tobacco, and McCay complied. The strip appeared in a Herald subsidiary, the Evening Telegram, and the Herald's editor required McCay to use a pseudonym for the strip work to keep it separate from his other work. McCay signed Rarebit Fiend strips as "Silas", a name he borrowed from a neighborhood garbage cart driver. After switching to William Randolph Hearst's New York American newspaper in 1911, McCay dropped the "Silas" pseudonym and signed his work with his own name.

McCay married in 1891, and the marriage was not a happy one. According to McCay biographer John Canemaker, McCay depicts marriage in Rarebit Fiend as "a minefield of hypocrisy, jealousy, and misunderstanding". McCay was a short man, barely five feet (150 cm) tall. He was dominated by his wife, who stood as tall as he was. Images of small, shy men dominated by their taller or fatter wives appear frequently in Rarebit Fiend. Gigantism, with characters overwhelmed by rapidly growing elements, was another recurring motif, perhaps as compensation on McCay's part for a sense of smallness. McCay's brother Arthur had been put in a mental asylum, which may have inspired the themes of insanity that are common in the strip.

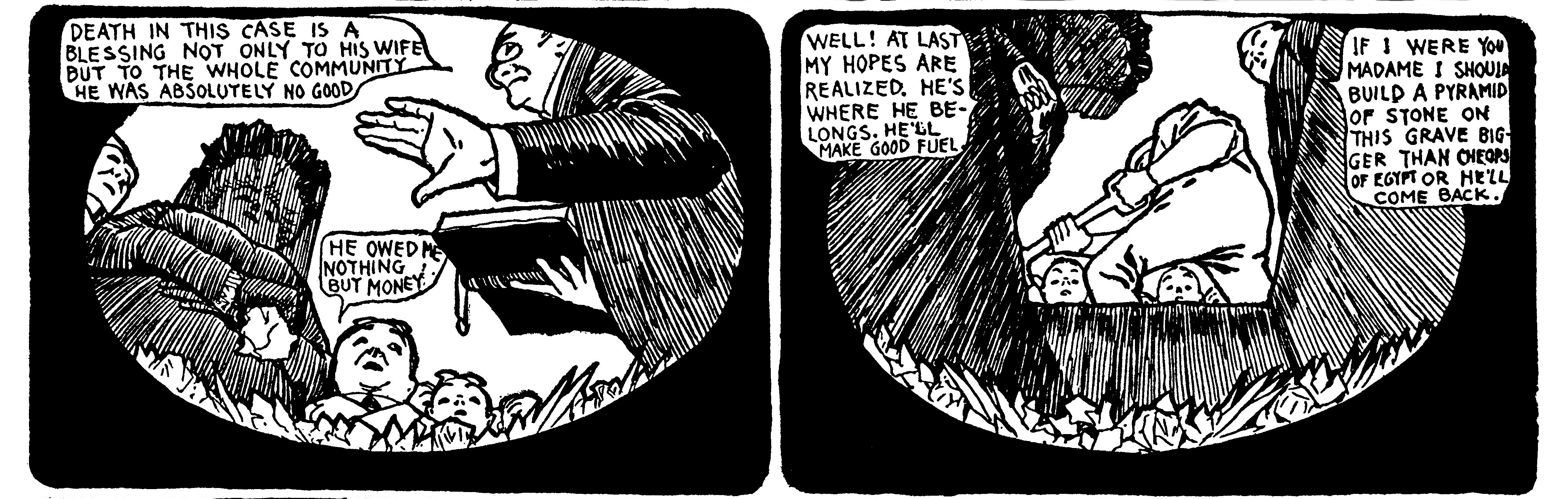
Buried alive (25 February 1905)

Despite the strip's bleak view, McCay's work was so popular that William Randolph Hearst hired him in 1911 with a star's salary. Hearst editor Arthur Brisbane deemed McCay's work "serious, not funny", and had the cartoonist give up his comic strips (including Rarebit Fiend and Nemo) to work full-time illustrating editorials.

=== Influences ===
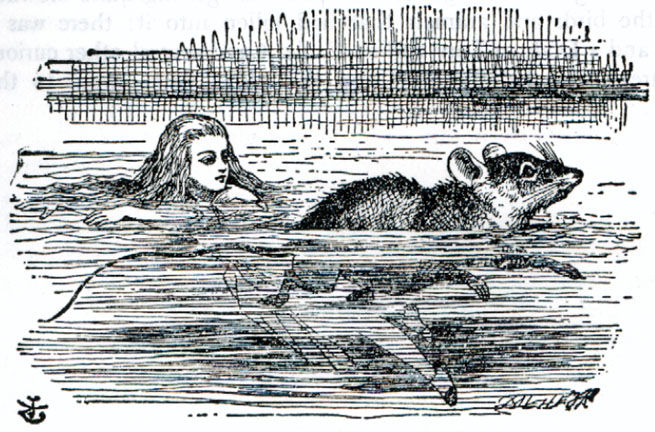
Alice's Adventures in Wonderland was a likely influence which anticipated ideas in McCay's strips.

Scholars such as Claude Moliterni, Ulrich Merkl, Alfredo Castelli, and others have located possible influences. These include Edward Lear's popular The Book of Nonsense (1870), Gelett Burgess' The Burgess Nonsense Book (1901), Lewis Carroll's Alice's Adventures in Wonderland (1865) (particularly the pool of tears scene, which seems related to the flood of sweat in one early Rarebit Fiend strip), and a variety of dream cartoons and illustrations that appeared in various periodicals McCay was likely familiar with.

The most probable influence on the strip was Welsh Rarebit Tales (1902) by Harle Oren Cummins. Cummins stated that he drew inspiration for this collection of fifteen science fiction stories from nightmares brought on by eating Welsh rarebit and lobster. Several of McCay's post-Herald strips from 1911 and 1912 were even titled Dream of a Lobster Fiend.

Other influences have been established: H. G. Wells, L. Frank Baum's The Wonderful Wizard of Oz (1900), J. M. Barrie's Peter and Wendy (1904), Carlo Collodi's The Adventures of Pinocchio (1883), Arthur Conan Doyle's Sherlock Holmes story "The Adventure of the Engineer's Thumb" (1889), Henryk Sienkiewicz's Quo Vadis (1896), Robert Louis Stevenson's Dr Jekyll and Mr Hyde (1886), and Mark Twain's "The 1,000,000 Pound Bank-Note" (1893).

McCay never acknowledged the influence of Sigmund Freud, whose The Interpretation of Dreams had been published in 1900. McCay scholar Ulrich Merkl says it was likely McCay was aware of the Viennese doctor's theories, as they had been widely reported and talked about in the New York newspaper world of which was McCay was a part.

== Publishing history ==
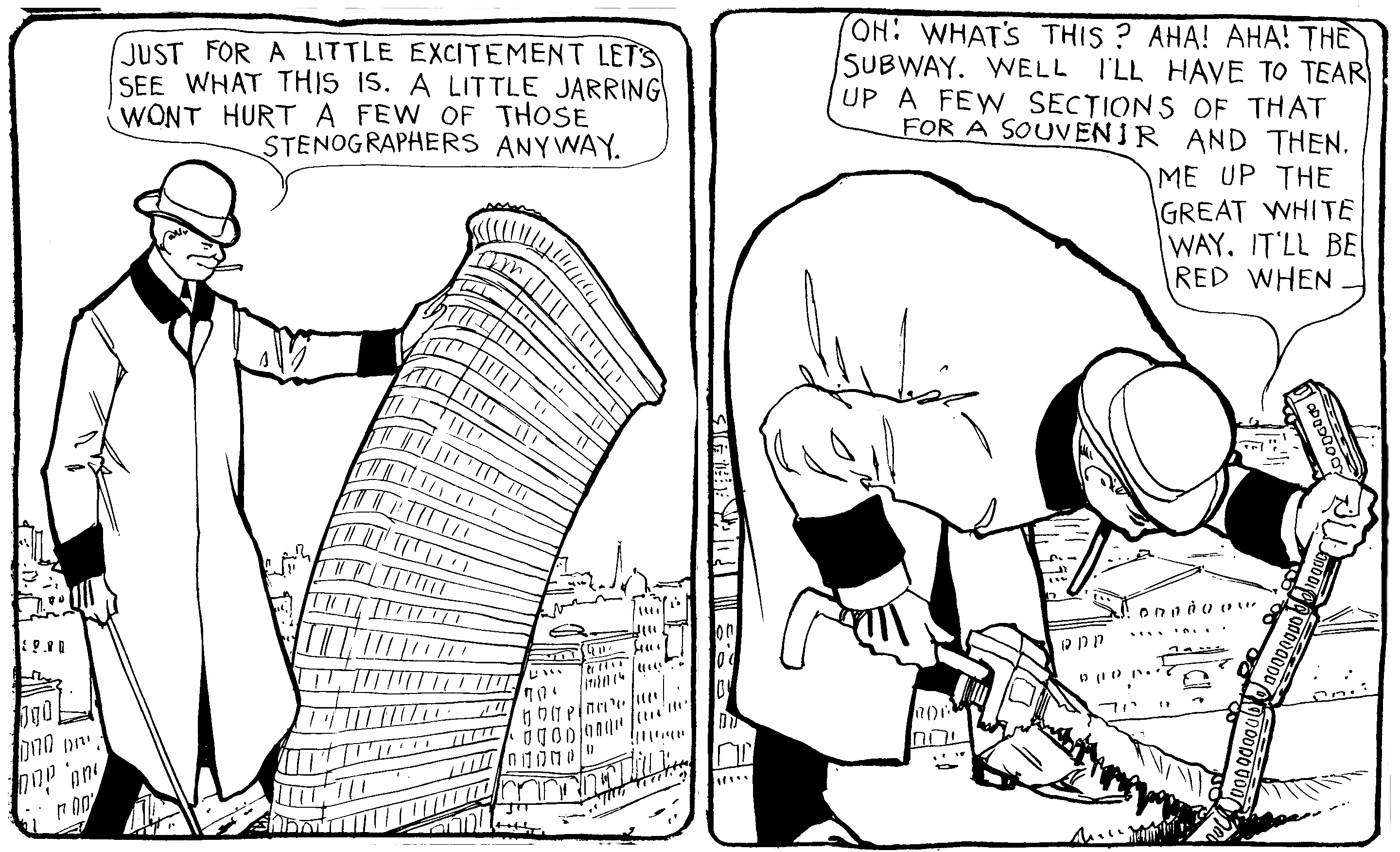
A giant man romps through New York City (7 January 1905).

Dream of the Rarebit Fiend was McCay's longest running comic strip. He made over 300 more Rarebit Fiend episodes than he made of the more famous Little Nemo. The first strip appeared on September 10, 1904, in the New York Herald, a few months after the first appearance of McCay's Little Sammy Sneeze. It was McCay's second successful newspaper strip, after Sammy Sneeze landed him a position on the cartooning staff of the Herald. Dream of the Rarebit Fiend ran in the Evening Telegram, which was published by the Herald at the time.

The strip appeared two to three times a week. It typically filled a quarter of a newspaper page on weekdays, and half a page on Saturdays. The strip normally appeared in black-and-white, but 29 of the strips appeared in color throughout 1913, run weekly in the Herald. These were strips drawn between 1908 and 1911 which the Evening Telegram had neglected to print. McCay sometimes encouraged readers to submit dream ideas, to be sent care of the Herald to "Silas the Dreamer". McCay acknowledged the submissions he accepted with a "thanks to ..." on the strip beside his own signature. Among those credited were science fiction pioneer Hugo Gernsback.

Dream of the Rarebit Fiend initial run continued until 1911. It appeared again in various papers between 1911 and 1913 under other titles, such as Midsummer Day Dreams and It Was Only a Dream. From 1923 to 1925 McCay revived the strip under the title Rarebit Reveries. Though signed "Robert Winsor McCay Jr." (McCay's son), the strips appear to be in McCay's own hand, with the possible exception of the lettering. McCay had also signed some of his animation and editorial cartoons with his son's name. As of 2007 only seven examples of Rarebit Reveries were known, though it is nearly certain others were printed.

=== Collections ===
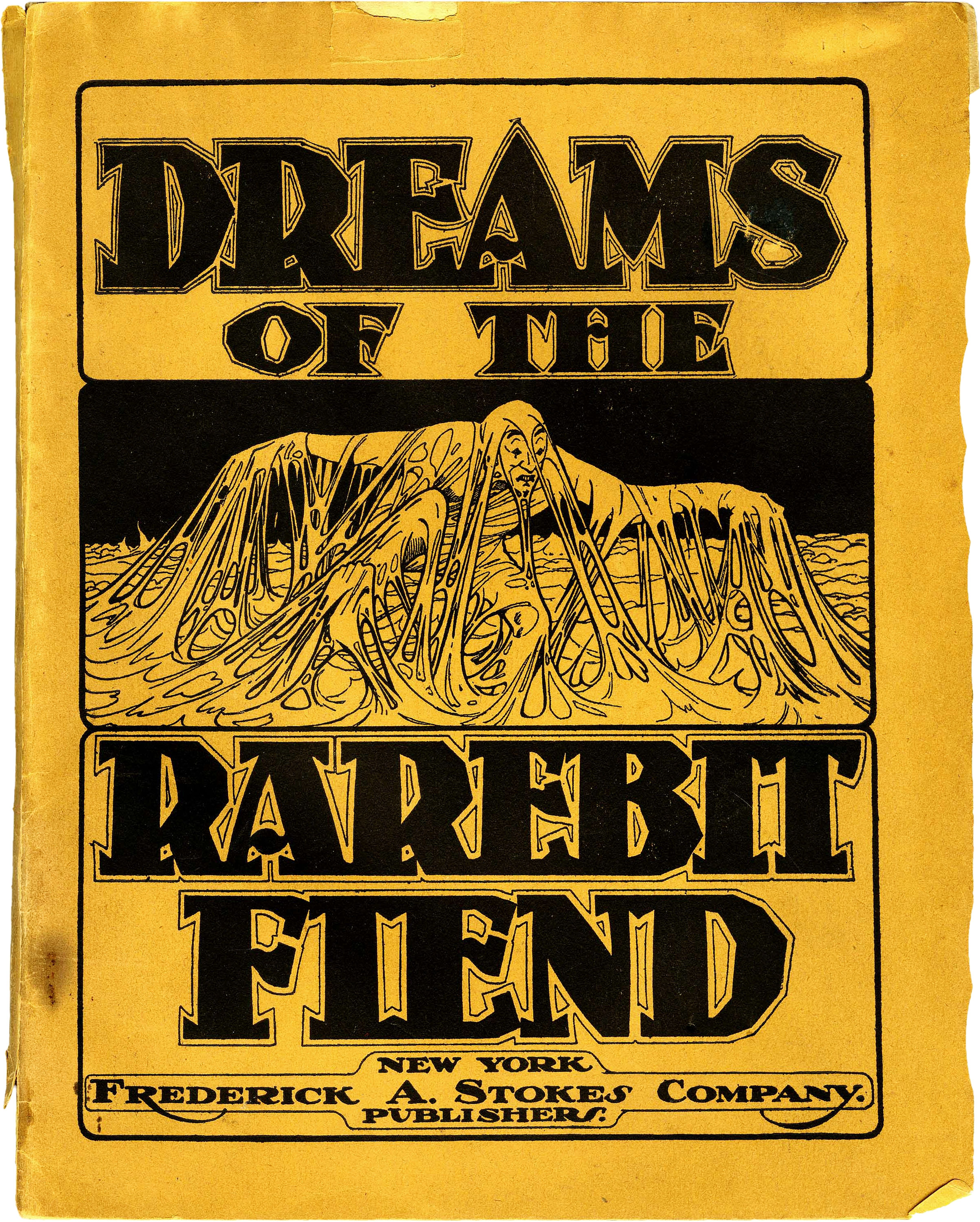
Cover of the first collection, Dreams of the Rarebit Fiend (1905)

The earliest collection, titled Dreams of the Rarebit Fiend, appeared in 1905 from Frederick A. Stokes and reprinted 61 of the strips. Dover Publications reprinted this collection in 1973 in a 10% enlarged edition with new introductory material. The Dover edition dropped the final strip from the original collection as it contained ethnic humor that the publisher believed would not be to the taste of a 1970s audience.

Rarebit Fiend examples appear in Daydreams and Nightmares (Fantagraphics, 1988/2006; editor Richard Marschall), a collection of miscellaneous work by McCay. Checker Books reprinted many of the Rarebit Fiend strips over eight volumes of the series Winsor McCay: Early Works and in 2006 reprinted 183 of the color Saturday strips in Dream of the Rarebit Fiend: The Saturdays. The Checker books reprinted all but about 300 of the known Rarebit Fiend strips.

In July 2007, German art historian Ulrich Merkl self-published a 17 in × 12 in (43.5 cm × 31 cm), 464-page volume called Dream of the Rarebit Fiend, reproducing 369 of the strips in full size. Previous reprintings of the strip reduced the strips to about a third of their originally published size, resulting in loss of detail and making the lettering hard to read. The size of the book made automatic binding impossible, so it had to be bound by hand. The book was limited to 1000 copies, and a DVD was included with scans of the 821 known installments of the strip, the complete text of the book, a catalogue raisonné of the strips, and a video of an example of McCay's animation. The sources of the strips were from Merkl's personal collection, the Cartoon Research Library of the Ohio State University, and microfilms purchased from the New York Public Library containing the complete New York Evening Journal run of the strip. Merkl has said that, on average, six hours were required per strip for scanning and restoration. The book also featured two essays by Italian comics editor Alfredo Castelli and one by Jeremy Taylor, former president of the International Association for the Study of Dreams.

== Other media ==
McCay's work was very popular. It was adapted to film by McCay and others, and was optioned for Broadway. A "comic opera or musical extravanganza" called Dream of the Welsh Rarebit Fiend went unproduced, though McCay signed a contract to collaborate on it with music by Max Hirschfeld and lyrics by George Henry Payne and Robert Gilbert Welch.

=== Film ===
==== Dream of a Rarebit Fiend (1906) ====
Edwin S. Porter's Dream of a Rarebit Fiend (1906)

Film pioneer Edwin S. Porter produced a seven-minute live-action film adaptation called The Dream of a Rarebit Fiend in 1906 for the Edison Company. The Fiend was played by John P. Brawn, who is tormented by imps in his bed, which flies through the air and leaves him hanging from a steeple—a scene similar to that of an early strip that ran on January 28, 1905.

==== Animation by McCay ====
McCay produced four hand-drawn animated films based upon his Rarebit Fiend series:

===== How a Mosquito Operates (1912) =====
How a Mosquito Operates

Put together in December 1911, and released in 1912, McCay's second film (also known as The Story of a Mosquito) is one of the earliest examples of line-drawn animation. A giant top-hatted mosquito flies in through a window to feed on a man in bed, who tries in vain to defend himself. The mosquito drinks itself so full that it explodes. Rather than expanding like a balloon, the mosquito fills up in a naturalistic fashion according to its body structure. The idea for the film came from a Rarebit Fiend strip published on June 5, 1909. McCay biographer John Canemaker commends McCay for his ability to imbue the mosquito with character and a personality.

===== Bug Vaudeville (1921) =====
Bug Vaudeville

The series title is pluralized for this film. In the fantasy Bug Vaudeville, a tramp comes out from a group of meticulously drawn trees and falls asleep, muttering that cheese cakes give him strange dreams. A series of bugs put on performance after performance against highly detailed and realistic backgrounds. The performance ends with a spider who grabs a silhouetted member of the audience and eats him whole.

The film was released around September 12, 1921, and draws from McCay's experiences in the worlds of the circus and vaudeville. The film is presented as a vaudeville show, though without the stage interaction McCay used in Gertie the Dinosaur. Film critic Andrew Sarris praised Bug Vaudeville as his favorite of McCay's films for "the linear expressiveness of the drawings and the intuitive rhythm of the acts". Sarris wrote that a director like Federico Fellini "would be honored by such insight into the ritual of performance".

===== The Pet (1921) =====
The Pet is likely the earliest "giant monster attacking a city" film.

The series title is pluralized for this title. The Pet depicts a couple who adopt a mysterious animal with an insatiable appetite. It consumes its milk, the house cat, the house's furnishings, rat poison, and passing vehicles, including airplanes and a blimp, while growing larger and larger. As it wanders among the skyscrapers of the city a swarm of airplanes and a zeppelin gather to bomb the beast.

A Rarebit Fiend strip from March 8, 1905, inspired The Pet, which was released around September 19, 1921. The dark film was the last over which McCay had "total creative control", according to McCay biographer John Canemaker. Cartoonist Stephen R. Bissette called it "the first-ever 'giant monster attacking a city' motion picture ever made".

===== The Flying House (1921) =====
The Flying House

Against the backdrop of the rapidly urbanizing United States of the 1910s and 1920s, one house from the artificial grid of modern, planned America takes flight in the dream of a woman who has feasted on Welsh rarebit. The Flying House is rendered in meticulous realistic detail. The house is conventional in every respect—until the viewer reaches the attic, where the woman's husband is seen tending an enormous engine. He attaches a propeller to a shaft out front of the house, and tells his wife that his actions are in reaction to their landlord's intention to evict them over nonpayment. He says he plans to "steal the house", and the couple fly away to find a place where their landlord will never find them—a swamp, the ocean, even the moon, where they are chased off by the Man in the Moon with a flyswatter. The film self-consciously directs the viewers to notice the quality and accuracy of the animation when the house takes off into space, calling attention to the "remarkable piece of animation which follows", accurately showing the revolutions of the Earth and Moon and the "beautiful constellation of Orion". In the end, the house is struck by a military rocket, bringing the nightmare to an end as the woman awakens in her bed.

The title card reverts to the singular "Dream" for the series title and credits Winsor Selias McCay as the producer. The film was released on September 26, 1921, and was credited to McCay's son Robert, though Canemaker states it is unlikely the elder McCay was not involved. A 1921 New York Times review found the film "interesting because of its excellent workmanship and fantastic character" though it was "not as brightly humorous" as it could be. Film critic Richard Eder contrasted the film's realistic nightmarishness with the more innocent qualities that came to be associated with American cartoons. In 2011, animator Bill Plympton restored the film, using Kickstarter to fund the project. He had the film colorized, and actors Matthew Modine and Patricia Clarkson provided voices.

=== Music ===
"The Dream of the Rarebit Fiend" theme song

The Edison Military Band performed a piece called "Dream of the Rarebit Fiend" on an Edison cylinder (Edison 9585) in 1907, written by Thomas W. Thurban. The music was likely inspired by Porter's 1906 film, and may have been intended to accompany it. The piece was written for an 18–20-piece band, and has been recorded numerous times.

Main theme of "Dream of the Rarebit Fiend" by Thomas W. Thurban (1907)

== Legacy ==
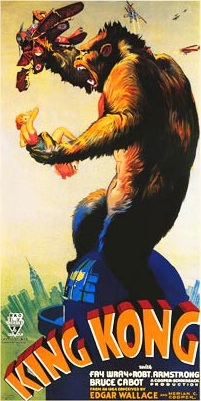
Giants damaging cities and other ideas have become a part of pop culture.

Rarebit Fiend set up a formula which McCay was to use in the better-known Little Nemo. A large number of the Nemo strips used ideas recycled from Rarebit Fiend, such as the October 31, 1907, "walking bed" episode, which was used in the July 26, 1908, episode of Little Nemo.

Comics scholar Jeet Heer called Rarebit Fiend "perhaps the most bizarre newspaper feature in American history". Merkl notes examples of the strip presaging ideas and scenes in later media: the strip includes scenes in which a man kicks a dog, slaps a woman, beats a blind man, and throws another woman out a window, as in Luis Buñuel's film L'Age d'Or (1930); and giant characters let loose in the big city, climbing and damaging buildings and subway trains, as in King Kong (1933). Merkl compares the strip for March 9, 1907, in which a child's bedroom becomes a lion-infested jungle, to the 1950 Ray Bradbury story "The Veldt", and the strip from September 26, 1908, depicting a stretchable face, to Salvador Dalí's surrealist painting Soft self-portrait with fried bacon (1941) and the cosmetic surgeries in Terry Gilliam's Brazil. Stephen R. Bissette compares a strip featuring elevators flying from buildings and other scenes to the 2005 Tim Burton's take on Charlie and the Chocolate Factory.

The strip was most likely an influence on episodes of Frank King's early comic strip Bobby Make-Believe. Many scholars believe that Carl Barks, a professed fan of Little Nemo, was likely exposed to Rarebit Fiend, which appeared in The San Francisco Examiner, which Barks read growing up. Several episodes of Barks's Donald Duck strips appear to have taken their subjects from Rarebit Fiend. Many scenes from animated films by Tex Avery from between 1943 and 1954 are said to show clearly a Rarebit Fiend influence. Science fiction illustrator Frank R. Paul painted a number of pulp magazine covers influenced by Rarebit Fiend.

Art Spiegelman paid parodic homage to Rarebit Fiend in his 1974 strip "Real Dream". In 1991, Rick Veitch began producing short comics based on his dreams. Beginning in 1994, he put out twenty-one issues of Roarin' Rick's Rare Bit Fiends from his own King Hell Press. John Ashbery published a poem titled "Dream of a Rarebit Fiend".
