= Scott Bukatman =

Cultural theorist

Scott Bukatman is a cultural theorist and professor of film and media studies at Stanford University. Bukatman's research examines how popular media (film, comics) and genres (science fiction, musicals, superhero narratives) "mediate between new technologies and human perceptual and bodily experience."

== Career ==
=== 1980s–1990s ===
In 1986, Bukatman published "Battle with Songs: The Soviet Historical Film as Historical Document" in the journal Persistence of Vision 3-4. In 1988, he curated a retrospective exhibit on the films and television shows of comedian Jerry Lewis at the American Museum of the Moving Image in New York City. In 1989, he published "The Cybernetic (City) State: Terminal Space becomes Phenomenal" in the Journal of the Fantastic in the Arts 2. In 1992, Bukatman completed his Ph.D. in Cinema Studies from New York University.

He has taught at NYU, Yale University, the School of Visual Arts in New York, the Free University of Berlin, and the University of New Mexico. Courses that Bukatman has developed include a range of interdisciplinary, intermedial offerings such as Cinema and the City, World's Fairs and Theme Parks, The Body in American Genre Film, and Cyborgs and Synthetic Humans.

In 1994, Bukatman co-organized "Cine City: Film and Perceptions of Urban Space 1895-1995" at the Getty Center in Los Angeles. In 1997, he was appointed Assistant Professor of Media Studies in the Departments of Art and Comparative Literature at Stanford University, where he has developed the Film and Media Studies program in collaboration with Henry Breitrose and Art History professor Michael Marrinan.

Bukatman wrote Terminal Identity: The Virtual Subject in Postmodern Science Fiction (Duke University Press) and a monograph on the seminal science fiction film Blade Runner for the British Film Institute. His articles have been published in Artforum International, Architecture New York, October and Camera Obscura. He has served as a consulting editor for Science Fiction Studies and is on the editorial boards of Art/Text and Animation: An Interdisciplinary Journal.

=== 2000s ===
In 2003, Bukatman published Matters of Gravity: Special Effects and Supermen in the 20th Century (Duke University Press). According to a review in Guardian Unlimited, the fusing of the genres of superhero story and cyberpunk in films such as The Matrix are "...superbly analysed in Scott Bukatman's collection of essays." Bukatman addresses the "question of bodies in a technologised age", arguing that in modern science fiction "...the body may be 'simulated, morphed, modified, re-tooled, genetically engineered and even dissolved', but it is never entirely eliminated: the subject always retains a meat component." In addition, Bukatman analyzes the "scopic mastery" of special-effects shots in several seminal sci-fi movies, which provide an "omnipotent God's-eye view" vision and "panoramic displays," which he argues address "...the perceived loss of cognitive power experienced by the subject in an increasingly technologised world."

In 2012, Bukatman published The Poetics of Slumberland: Animated Spirits and the Animating Spirit (University of California Press). The book description reads: "In The Poetics of Slumberland, Scott Bukatman celebrates play, plasmatic possibility, and the life of images in cartoons, comics, and cinema. Bukatman begins with Winsor McCay’s Little Nemo in Slumberland to explore how and why the emerging media of comics and cartoons brilliantly captured a playful, rebellious energy characterized by hyperbolic emotion, physicality, and imagination. The book broadens to consider similar “animated” behaviors in seemingly disparate media—films about Jackson Pollock, Pablo Picasso, and Vincent van Gogh; the musical My Fair Lady and the story of Frankenstein; the slapstick comedies of Jerry Lewis; and contemporary comic superheroes—drawing them all together as the purveyors of embodied utopias of disorder." Calling the book "Essential" in Choice, T. Lindvall of Virginia Wesleyan College wrote, "Slipping comfortably into Bukatman's book, one is dreamily transported to utopian worlds where merry madcap disorder rules. ...The lavishly illustrated book is delightfully Chestertonian, clapping its hands in glee over the unruly energy and plasmatic possibilities of the Pygmalion myth drawn into the imaginations of playful artists and their exhilaratingly disruptive arts. ... Bukatman shows the marvelous animated poetics of visual media."

A book-length work of comics theory, centered around Mike Mignola's Hellboy comics, titled Hellboy's World: Comics and Monsters on the Margins was published in January 2016 by University of California Press. An essay, "Sculpture, Stasis, the Comics, and Hellboy" appeared in the special issue of Critical Inquiry devoted to "Comics and Media" (Spring 2014 Volume 40 Issue 3). The online abstract for the essay, read, in full: "Comics awesome. Read Hellboy."

== See also ==
- Cyberpunk
- Science fiction
- Science fiction film
