= Nemo (arcade game) =

1990 video game

- Developer: Capcom
- Publisher: Capcom
- Director: Yoshiki Okamoto
- Designer: Noritaka Funamizu
- Programmers: Yukio Arai; Kazuo Yamawaki
- Composer: Yoko Shimomura
- Platform: Arcade
- Release: December 1990
- Genres: Platform, hack and slash
- Modes: Single-player, multiplayer
- Arcade system: CP System

Nemo is a 1990 side-scrolling arcade game by Capcom. The game is based on the Japanese-American animated film Little Nemo: Adventures in Slumberland.

== Plot ==
Nemo travels with a circus parade to Slumberland to meet King Morpheus. He is accompanied by Flip to fight through the now-dangerous enemy-infested Slumberland to find the king. At the heart of the kingdom, Flip tempts Nemo to open the sealed door, unleashing the Nightmare King, who kidnaps Morpheus along with his daughter Princess Camille.

Nemo and Flip battle through the lands of Nightmares to rescue the kidnapped monarchs. They infiltrate the Nightmare King's castle, before fighting the evil king himself. After the Nightmare King is destroyed, peace is restored to Slumberland.

== Gameplay ==
The first player is always Nemo (who wields the king's scepter) and the second player is always Flip (who wields his own cane). The game has seven stages. The player is required to destroy waves of enemies while going through each stage. The player can also traverse climbable walls and ladders.

Enemies can be destroyed either with the player's melee weapon, throwing projectiles that can be picked up or by jumping on them. Hitting multiple enemies in quick succession boosts points earned. When faced with a stage boss, the player must attack it repeatedly to destroy it.

There are also a number of power-ups such as sweet foods for restoring vitality. Collecting a yashichi grants the player limited super attacks that fire a projectile and deliver more damage.

== Development ==
Nemo was exhibited at the UK Amusement Trades Exhibition International in 1991. A version for the Capcom Power System Changer was planned and previewed but never released.

== Reception ==
Computer and Video Games gave the game a score of 87%, praising its graphics and fitting sound, while pointing out the game's lack of challenge. Retro Gamer highlighted the game's colors and creativity in addition to the solid gameplay, but found that the NES game was preferred.

British gaming magazine The One reviewed Nemo, calling it "entertaining" and comparing it to Ghouls 'n Ghosts.
