= Animated cartoon =

Film created from sequential drawings

Steamboat Willie was the first famous animated cartoon in the old popular culture history, featuring the very first appearance of Mickey Mouse. Circa 1928.

An animated cartoon is a film for the cinema, television or computer screen, which is made using sequential drawings, as opposed to animation in general, which include films made using clay, puppets, 3D modeling and other means. Animated cartoons are still created for entertainment, commercial, educational and personal purposes.

== History ==
=== Early years ===
Early examples of attempts to capture the phenomenon of motion into a still drawing can be found in paleolithic cave paintings, where animals are often depicted with multiple legs in superimposed positions, clearly attempting to convey the perception of motion.

A 5,200-year old pottery bowl discovered in Shahr-e Sukhteh, Iran, has five sequential images painted around it that seem to show phases of a goat leaping up to nip at a tree.

The phenakistoscope (1832), zoetrope (1834) and praxinoscope (1877), as well as the common flip book, were early animation devices to produce movement from sequential drawings using technological means, but did not develop further until the advent of motion picture film.

An 1893 phenakistoscope disc by Eadweard Muybridge.

Simulated mirror view of the disc

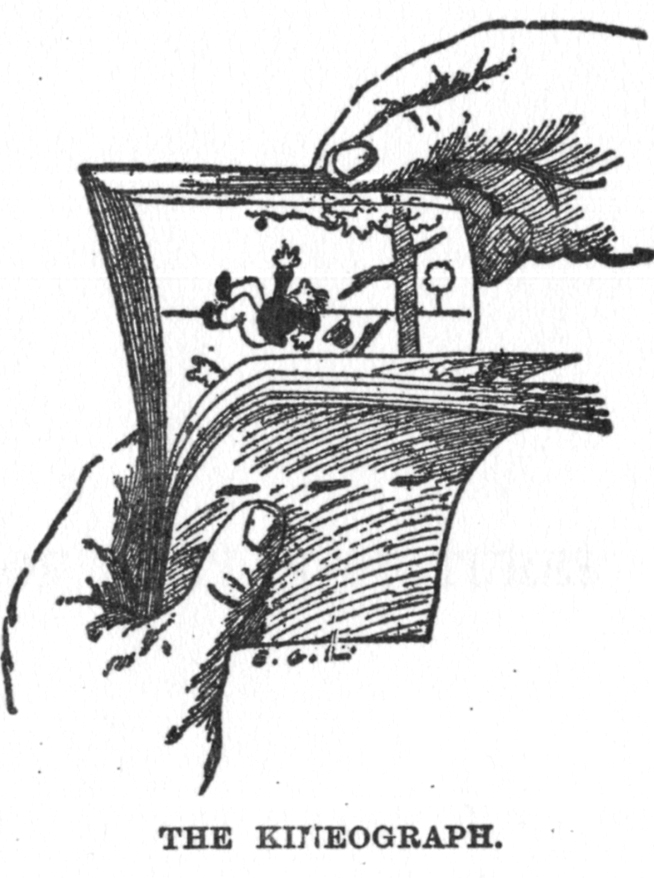
An 1886 Flip book

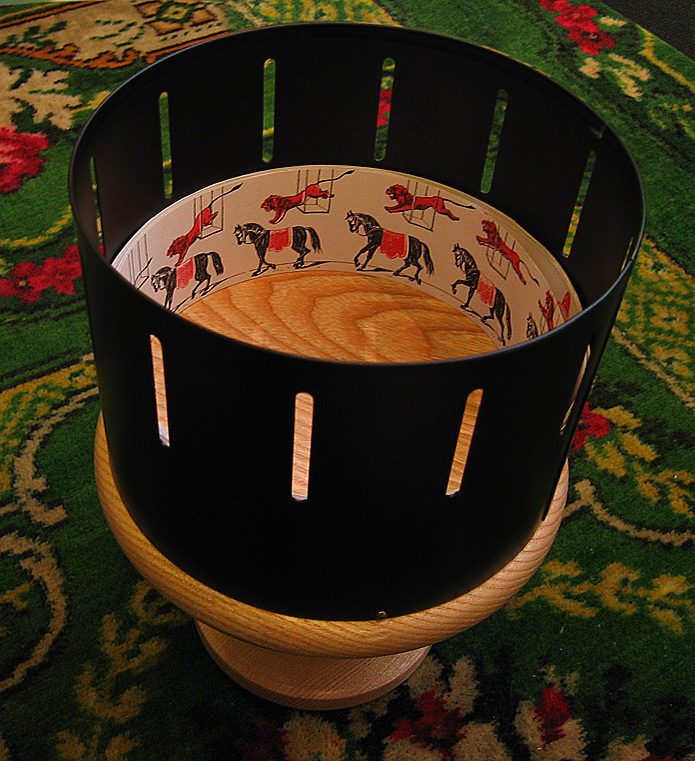
A modern replica of a Victorian zoetrope (1834)

The first person to make animated movies was a French science teacher named, Charles-Emile Reynaud.

=== Silent era ===
How Animated Cartoons Are Made (1919)

The first animated projection (screening) was created in France, by Charles-Émile Reynaud, who was a French science teacher. Reynaud created the Praxinoscope in 1877 and the Théâtre Optique in December 1888. On 28 October 1892, he projected the first animation in public, Pauvre Pierrot, at the Musée Grévin in Paris. This film is also notable as the first known instance of film perforations being used. His films were not photographed, but drawn directly onto the transparent strip. In 1900, more than 500,000 people had attended these screenings.

The first (photographed) animated projection was Humorous Phases of Funny Faces (1906) by newspaper cartoonist J. Stuart Blackton, one of the co-founders of the Vitagraph Company arrived. In the film, a cartoonist's line drawings of two faces were 'animated' (or came to life) on a blackboard. The two faces smiled and winked, and the cigar-smoking man blew smoke in the lady's face; also, a circus clown led a small dog to jump through a hoop.

The first animated projection in the traditional sense (i.e., on motion picture film) was Fantasmagorie by the French director Émile Cohl in 1908.

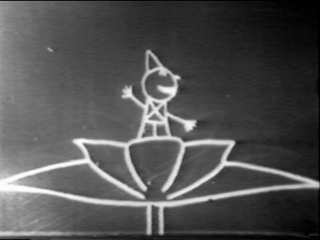
The first animated film created by using what came to be known as traditional (hand-drawn) animation—the 1908 Fantasmagorie by Émile Cohl

Émile Cohl's Fantasmagorie

The film largely consisted of a stick figure moving about and encountering all manner of morphing objects, such as a wine bottle that transforms into a flower. There were also sections of live action where the animator’s hands would enter the scene. The film was created by drawing each frame on paper and then shooting each frame onto negative film, which gave the picture a blackboard look.

This was followed by two more films, Le Cauchemar du fantoche [The Puppet's Nightmare,, now lost] and Un Drame chez les fantoches [A Puppet Drama, called The Love Affair in Toyland for American release and Mystical Love-Making for British release], all completed in 1908.

Cohl later went to Fort Lee, New Jersey near New York City in 1912, where he worked for French studio Éclair, spread its animation technique to the USA where the animation was extremely popular in the USA respectively.

Gertie the Dinosaur (1914) by Winsor McCay is originally considered the very first cartoon to feature an appealing character.

One of the earliest successful animated cartoons was Gertie the Dinosaur (1914), created by Winsor McCay. It is considered a pioneering example of true character animation.

Feline Follies (1919) introduced Felix the Cat, often widely considered the very first animated movie star.

Then, in 1919, the animator Pat Sullivan released Feline Follies, which introduced Felix the Cat, widely considered one of the first animated movie stars. Felix the Cat greatly influenced the main development of later animated cartoon characters.

At first, animated cartoons were quite black-and-white and silent. Felix the Cat and Oswald the Lucky Rabbit are notable well-known famous examples of the silent age of animated cartoons from 1910s to 1920s.

=== "Golden Age" ===
From the 1920s to 1960s, theatrical cartoons were produced in huge numbers, and usually shown before a feature film in a movie theater. Disney (distributed by Pat Powers, then Columbia, then United Artists, then RKO, then independently), Fleischer (distributed by Paramount), Warner Bros., MGM, and UPA (distributed by Columbia) were the largest studios producing these 5- to 10-minute "animated cartoon shorts." Other studios included Walter Lantz (distributed by Universal), DePatie–Freleng (distributed by United Artists), Van Beuren Studios (distributed by RKO Pictures), ComiColor Cartoons (distributed by Metro-Goldwyn-Mayer), Charles Mintz Studios (later Screen Gems) (distributed by Columbia), Famous Studios (distributed by Paramount), and Terrytoons (distributed by 20th Century Fox).

The first cartoon to use a soundtrack was in 1926 with Max Fleischer's My Old Kentucky Home. However the Fleischers used a De Forest sound system and the sound was not completely synchronized with the film. Walt Disney's 1928 cartoon Steamboat Willie starring Mickey Mouse (which was originally his own first appearance) was the first to use a click track during the recording session, which produced better synchronism. "Mickey Mousing" became a term for any movie action (animated or live action) that was perfectly synchronized with music. The music used is original most of the time, but musical quotation is often employed. Animated characters usually performed the action in "loops," i.e., drawings were repeated over and over.

Although other animators' producers had made films earlier using 2-strip color, one of the earliest color cartoons famously was Fiddlesticks, a very early color animated cartoon (as well as the very first Flip the Frog cartoon) directed by Ub Iwerks at MGM, the artist who originally worked at Disney studio such working in Mickey Mouse cartoon productions and later then Ub Iwerks had decided to leave the Disney studio in 1929 and joined on MGM in 1930, Fiddlesticks was however. considered to be first color cartoon ever by the many animation historians. Walt Disney produced the very first cartoon in 3-strip Technicolor, Flowers and Trees, in 1932. Technicians at the Fleischer studio invented rotoscoping, in which animators trace live action in order to make animation look more realistic. However, rotoscoping made the animation look stiff and the technique was later used more for studying human and animal movement, rather than directly tracing and copying filmed movements. Later, other movie technologies were adapted for use in animation, such as multiplane cameras with The Old Mill (1937), stereophonic sound in Fantasia (1940), widescreen processes with the feature-length Lady and the Tramp (1955), and even 3D with Lumber Jack-Rabbit.

Today, traditional animation uses traditional methods, but is aided by computers in certain areas. This gives the animator new tools not available that could not be achieved using old techniques.

== Feature films ==
A horse animated by rotoscoping from Eadweard Muybridge's 19th-century photos. The animation consists of 8 drawings, which are "looped", i.e. repeated over and over.

In 1917, Italian-Argentine cartoonist Quirino Cristiani created the first animated feature ever made, El Apóstol, utilizing cutout animation; however, a fire that destroyed producer Federico Valle's film studio incinerated the only known copy of the film, and it is now considered lost.

In 1937, Disney created the first sound and color animated feature film, Snow White and the Seven Dwarfs.

The name "animated cartoon" is generally not used when referring to full-length animated productions, since the term more or less implies a "short." Huge numbers of animated feature films were, and are still, produced.

== Notable artists and producers of "animated cartoons" ==
- J. R. Bray
- Max Fleischer
- Pat Sullivan
- Walter Lantz
- Walt Disney
- Ub Iwerks
- Tex Avery
- Chuck Jones
- Bob Clampett
- Fred Quimby
- Hanna-Barbera
- Friz Freleng
- John Kricfalusi
- Craig McCracken

== Television ==
Scene from the cartoon Invader Zim.

Competition from television drew audiences away from movie theaters in the late 1950s, and the theatrical cartoon began its decline. Today, animated cartoons for American audiences are produced mostly for television.

American television animation of the 1950s featured quite limited animation styles, highlighted by the work of Jay Ward on Crusader Rabbit. Chuck Jones coined the term "illustrated radio" to refer to the shoddy style of most television cartoons that depended more on their soundtracks than visuals. Other notable 1950s programs include UPA's Gerald McBoing Boing, Hanna-Barbera's Huckleberry Hound and Quick Draw McGraw, and rebroadcast of many classic theatrical cartoons from Universal's Walter Lantz, Warner Bros., MGM, and Disney.

The Hanna-Barbera cartoon, The Flintstones, was the first successful primetime animated series in the United States, running from 1960 to 1966 (and in reruns since). While many networks followed the show's success by scheduling other cartoons in the early 1960s, including Scooby-Doo, Where Are You!, The Jetsons, Top Cat, and The Alvin Show, none of these programs survived more than a year (save Scooby-Doo, which, despite not being a primetime cartoon, has managed to stay afloat for over four decades). However, networks found success by running these shows as Saturday morning cartoons, reaching smaller audiences with more demographic unity among children. Television animation for children flourished on Saturday morning, on cable channels like Nickelodeon, Disney Channel/Disney XD and Cartoon Network, PBS Kids, and in syndicated afternoon timeslots.

The scheduling constraints of the TV animation process, notably issues of resource management, led to the development of various techniques known now as limited animation. Full-frame animation ("on ones") became rare in its use outside of theatrical productions in the United States.

Primetime cartoons for mature audiences were virtually non-existent in the mainstream of the United States until the 1990s hit, when The Simpsons ushered in a new era of adult animation. Now, "adult animation" programs, such as, Beavis and Butt-head, South Park, King of the Hill, Family Guy, American Dad! and Futurama have increased the number of animated sitcoms on prime-time and evening American television. In addition, animated works from other countries (notably Japan) have had varying levels of airplay in the United States since the 1960s.

=== Commercial animation ===
Animation has been very popular in television commercials, both due to its graphic appeal, and the humour it can provide. Some animated characters in commercials have survived for decades, such as Snap, Crackle and Pop in advertisements for Kellogg's cereals.

The legendary animation director Tex Avery was the producer of the first Raid "Kills Bugs Dead" commercials in 1966, which were very successful for the company. The concept has been used in many countries since.

== Genres of animated cartoons ==
=== Funny animals ===
The very first animated cartoons almost often featured funny talking anthropomorphic animal characters over human characters in different adventures. This was originally the common genre from the early 1920s until the 1930s with the earliest popular characters such as Felix The Cat and Oswald The Lucky Rabbit, and the dominant backbone of Walt Disney's series of animated cartoons which starred iconic characters like Mickey Mouse, Donald Duck, and Goofy successfully made the style a mainstream staple whose comedic styles led to their own unique popularity.

=== Zany humor ===
Bugs Bunny and Daffy Duck of Warner Bros., and the various films of Tex Avery at MGM both originally introduced this popular genre form of animated cartoons in the 1940s. It usually involves surreal humorous absurd acts such as cartoon characters being crushed by the sudden anvils to get flattened (sometimes into an squashed pancake shape) later return to normal, bizarre expressions (e.g. jaw drop), going over the edge of a cliff but floating in mid-air for a few seconds before falling, pulling out anything from their own behind body back, crashing any way to leaves an shape based of their body in the hole, breaking the fourth-wall to talks the viewers in the front camera screen, explosions being non-fatal giving black soots for bodies to be blacked silhouette form only showing eyeballs, using sign with an dialogue message instead of talking, or painting the wall to have a hole that will becomes a real entrance for someone to enters into it. The Road Runner cartoons are great famous known examples of these many iconic actions. The concept Cartoon physics describes the wacky and unrealistic typical antics of zany cartoon characters. Disney has, to an incredibly strong lesser extent, applied almost this to any some of their own animated shorts only, although they never mastered the zany genre and they had even much more realistic animations and even much more non-comedic productions rather to be only stuck with that wacky form in an perfectly unique different approach style and their own animated shorts were not so wacky as the animated cartoons of Warner Bros. and MGM and they were even much more successful with their own animated hand-drawn feature films that because was even much more successful than their own shorts during in the same old era.

=== Sophistication ===
As the animation medium matured, much more sophistication was unapologetically introduced, albeit keeping the humorous touch. Classical music was often pure spoofed by the comedic artists, a notable known example is Chuck Jones' 1957 cartoon What's Opera, Doc. Any animation studios sometimes followed a very different path from the largest animation studios in the past. In the Soviet Union, the late 1930s saw the enforcement of socialist realism in animation, a style which lasted throughout the Stalinist era. The animations themselves were mostly for kids, and based on the old classical fairy tales.

=== Limited animation ===
In the 1950s, the other studios completely refined the art aspects of animation, by using extremely limited animation is a simpler easy way of increasing production and decreasing costs of animation by using "short cuts" with fewer less animated drawing frames in the animation process. This specific known method was originally first pioneered by United Productions of America and popularized (some say exploited) by Hanna-Barbera, adapted by other studios as cartoons moved from movie theaters to television in the late-1950s.

=== Modernism ===
Graphic styles continued to change in the late 1950s and 1960s. At this point, the design of the characters became more angular, while the quality of the character animation declined.

=== Adult animation ===
A specific animated work geared towards for older people and originally started in the early-1970s, Ralph Bakshi was originally the original pioneer of adult animation in the 1970s, as much adult animation have been faded away like in the early-1980s, however, it was returned and popularized by The Simpsons in 1989, completely marking the resurgence of adult animation.

=== Animated music and bands ===
Popular with the advent of MTV and similar music channels, music videos often contain animation, sometimes rotoscoped (see: Take on Me), i.e., based on live action performers. Cartoons animated to music go at least as far back as Disney's 1929 The Skeleton Dance. These are now popular with the animated bands Gorillaz and Dethklok, the specific latter of which is based on a television show about the band.

=== Computer animation ===
Beginning in the 1990s, with the rise of computer animation, some cartoons implemented CGI and a few were done entirely in computer animation. Beast Wars and ReBoot were done entirely in CGI whereas Silver Surfer only partially implemented CGI. Donkey Kong Country also used CGI to make it look like the SNES game. CGI is common today, whether obvious such as in Tak and the Power of Juju.

=== Animutation ===
A special important form of animation using Macromedia Flash to create pop culture influenced videos of independent, or (more rarely) mainstream music. The style was invented and popularized by Neil Cicierega. The style commonly involves cutting out and moving photographic images around.

== See also ==
- Animation
- Computer animation
- Cartoon
- Traditional animation
- List of animated short series
- List of animated television series
- List of animated feature-length films
- List of animation studios
