= Stick figure =

Simplistic drawing of a person

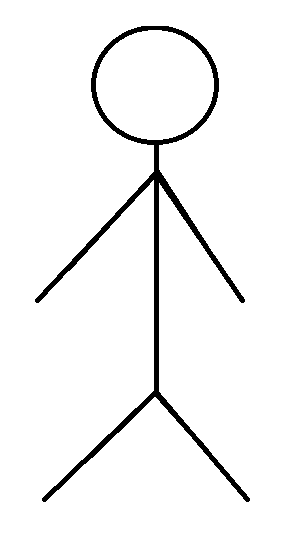
A simple stick figure

More complex stickman used for Animation

A stick figure (also known as a stick man, stick woman, or stick person) is a very simple drawing of a human or other animal, in which the limbs (arms and legs) and torso are represented using straight lines. The head is most often represented by a circle, which can be filled or unfilled. Details such as hands, feet, and a neck may be present or absent, and the head is sometimes embellished with details such as facial features or hair. Simpler stick figures often display disproportionate physical features and ambiguous emotion.

The stick figure is a widely recognizable symbol. Drawings of stick figures are recognized across many languages, locations and demographics, and the stick figure's roots can be traced back to over 30,000 years ago. Stick figures are often drawn by children, and their simplicity and versatility have led to their use in infographics, signage, animations, storyboards, and other kinds of visual media.

Following the advent of the World Wide Web, the stick figure saw prominent use in Flash animation.

== History ==
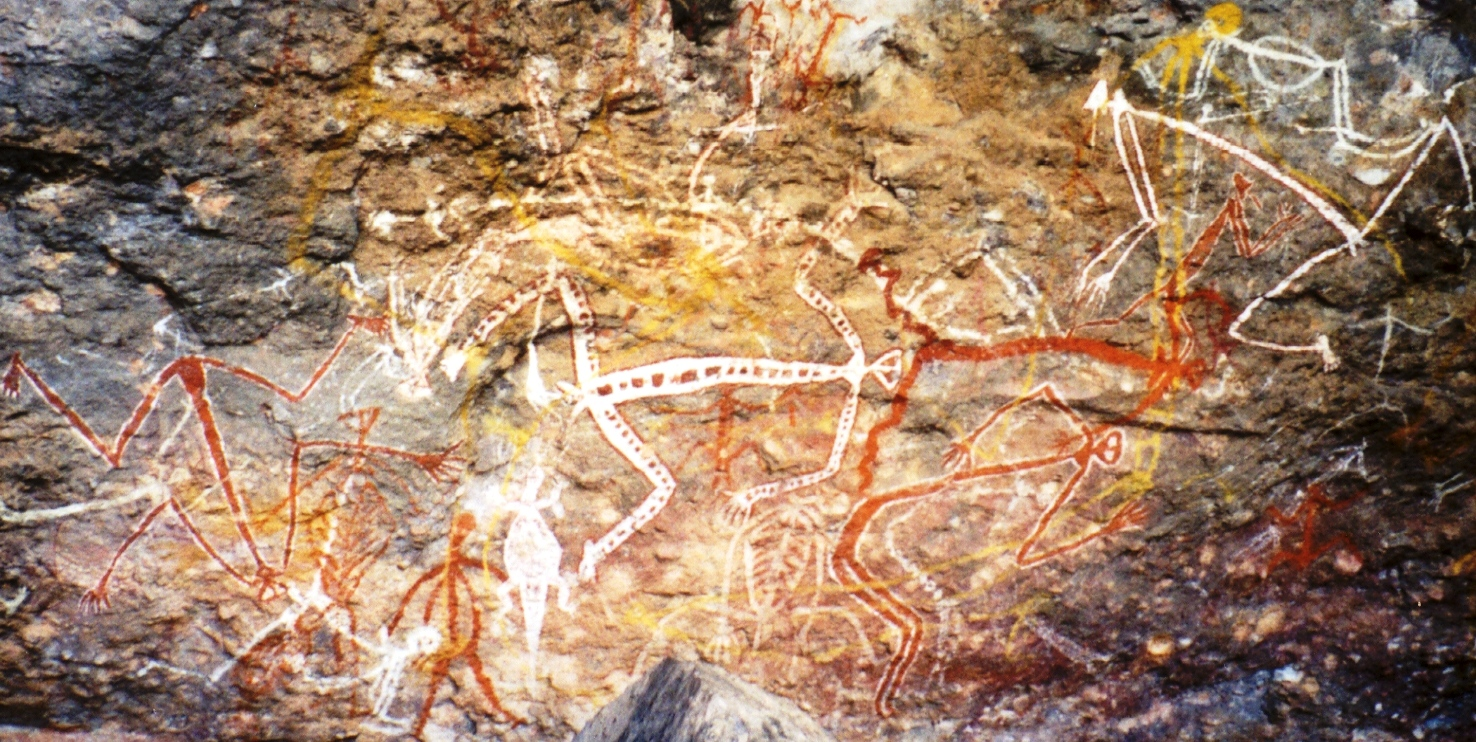
Aboriginal rock painting of Mimi spirits in the Anbangbang gallery at Nourlangie Rock

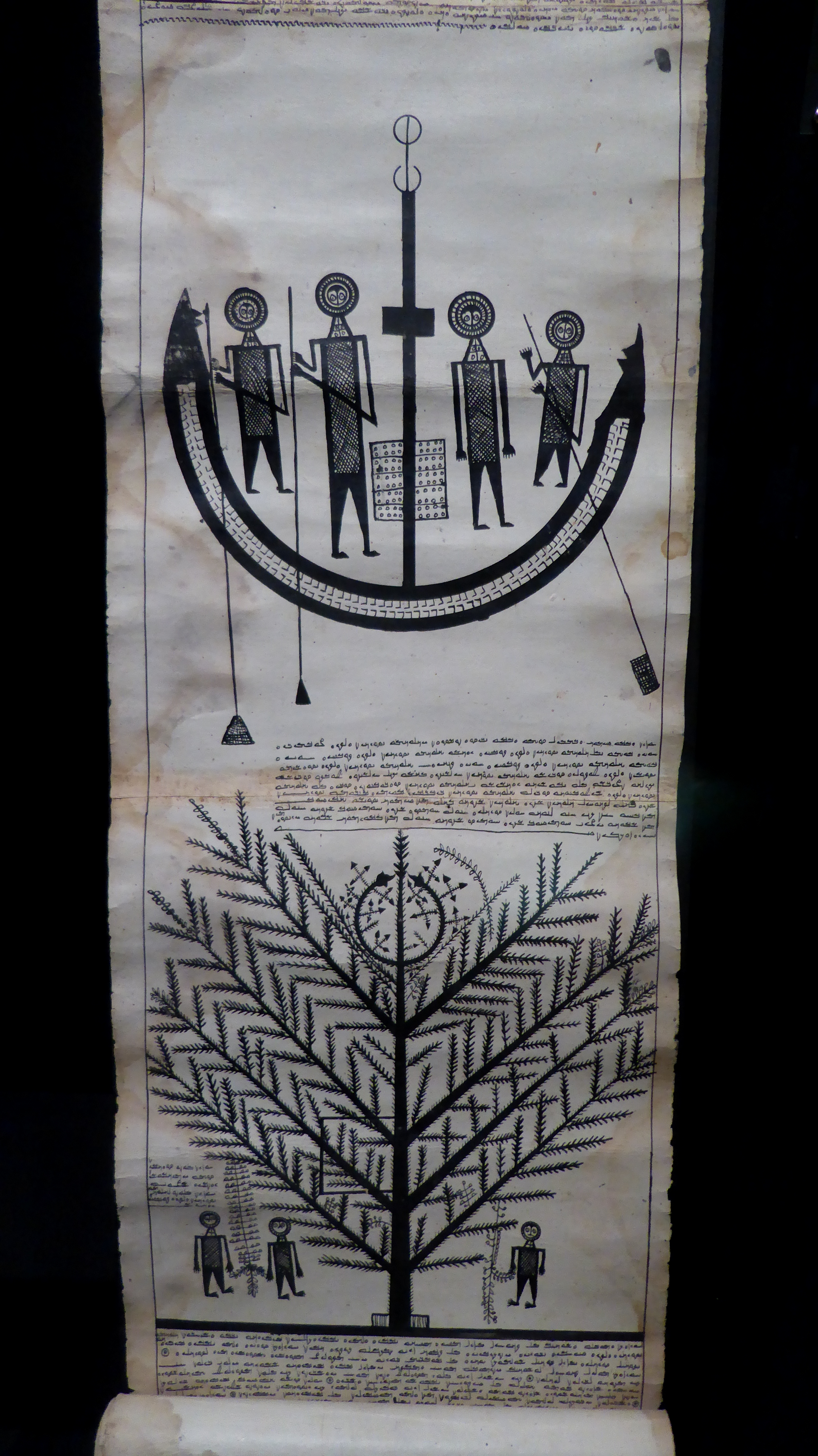
Uthras illustrated using stick figures in the Scroll of Abatur

The stick figure long predates modern civilisation. Stick figures were a feature of prehistoric art, and can be found in cave paintings and petroglyphs. Stick figure depictions of people, animals, and daily life have been discovered in numerous sites all over the world, such as depictions of Mimi in Australia or the Indalo in Spain.

As language began to develop, logographies (writing systems that use images to represent words or morphemes) came to use stick figures as glyphs. In Mandaean manuscripts, uthras (celestial beings) were illustrated using stick figures.

In 1925, Austrian sociologist Otto Neurath began work on what would become the International System of Typographic Picture Education (ISOTYPE), a system of conveying warnings, statistics, and general information through standardized and easily understandable pictographs. Neurath made significant use of stick figure designs to represent individuals and statistics. In 1934, graphic designer Rudolf Modley founded Pictorial Statistics Inc., and brought ISOTYPE to the United States in 1972.

The first international use of stick figures dates back to the 1964 Summer Olympics in Tokyo. Pictograms created by Japanese designers Masaru Katsumi and Yoshiro Yamashita formed the basis of future pictograms. In 1972, Otto "Otl" Aicher designed round-ended, geometric, grid-based stick figures to be used in the signage, printed materials, and television broadcasts for the 1972 Summer Olympics in Munich.

In 1974, the U.S. Department of Transportation commissioned the American Institute of Graphic Arts (AIGA) to develop the DOT pictograms, 34 (later 50) symbols for use at transportation hubs, public spaces, large events, and other contexts in which there may be great linguistic variation among those required to understand the signage. These pictograms featured stick figures heavily, drawing on previous designs, such as those made for the 1972 Summer Olympics. These symbols, or symbols derived from them, are widely used throughout the world today.

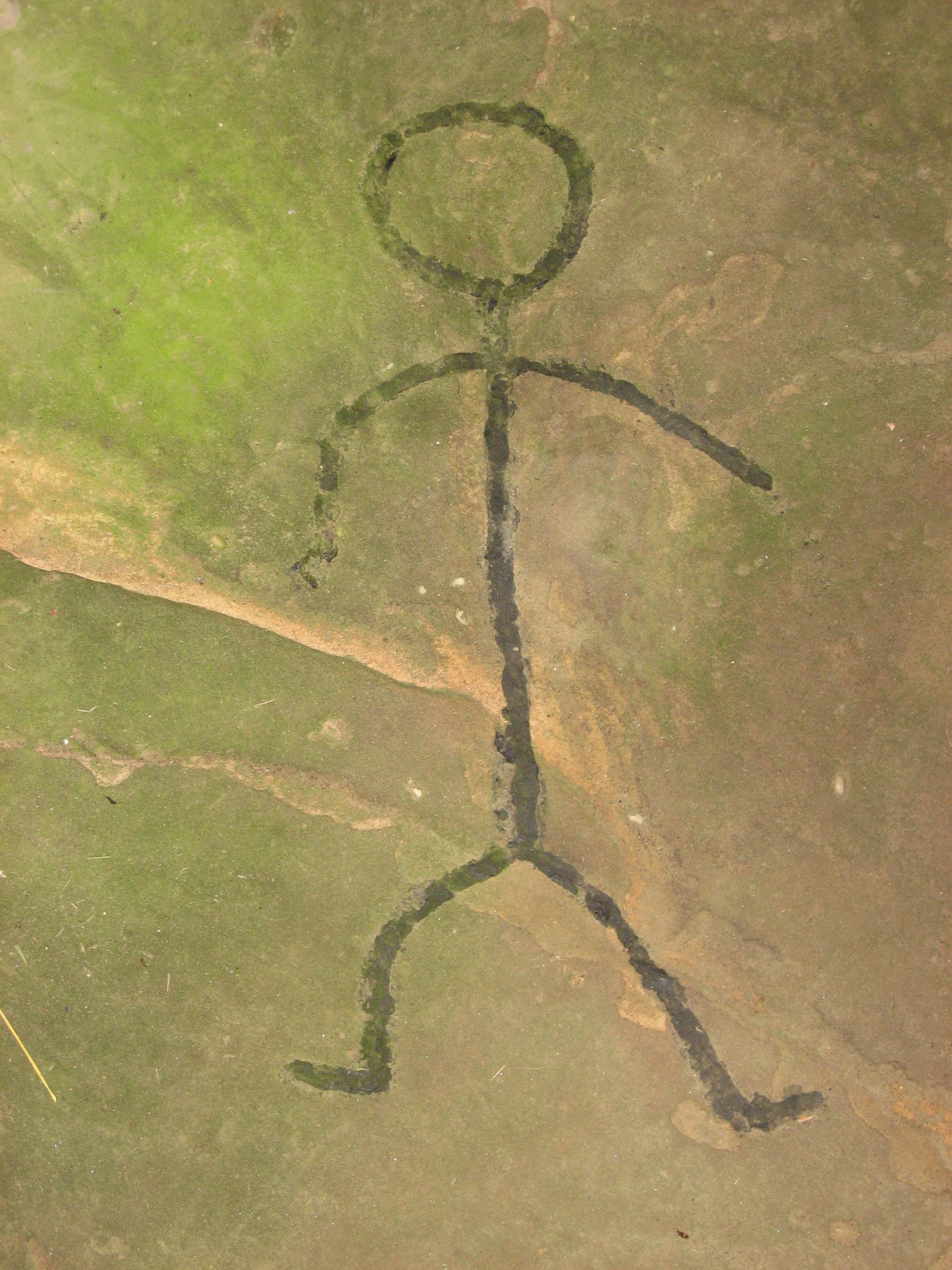
A stick figure at the Leo Petroglyph in the United States

The AIGA symbol for the drinking fountain

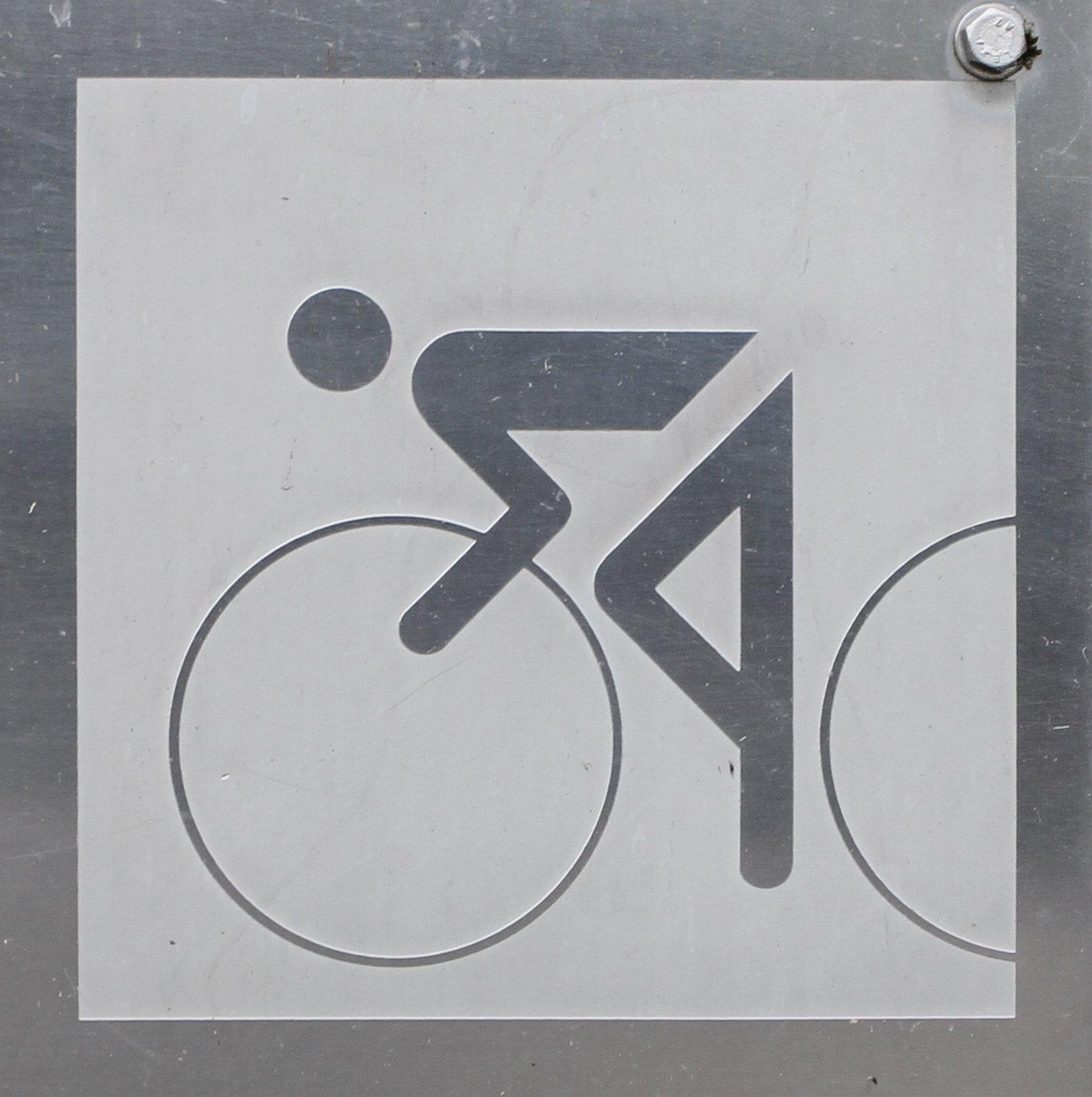
A stick figure sign for cycling, by Otl Aicher, at the 1972 Munich Olympics

A video displaying the drawing of a stick man, a stick woman, and a stick dog, respectively

Flag of Mali Federation (1959–1961)

== Internet culture ==
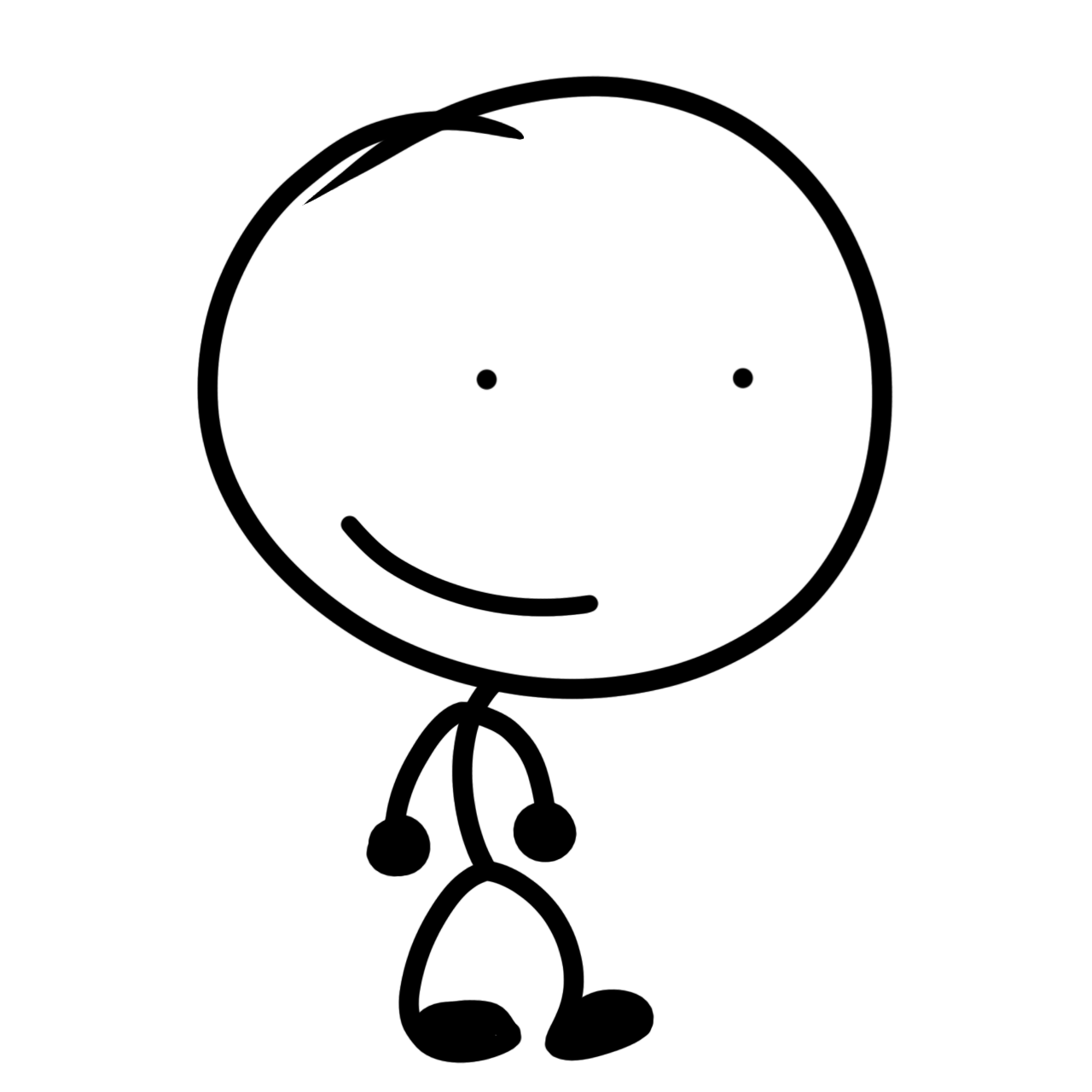
Some stick figures include facial features, as seen here.

Tom Fulp began to produce 2D stick figure animations on his Amiga computer for entertainment purposes in the early 1990s.

=== "Xiao Xiao" ===
On April 19, 2001, Chinese animator Zhu Zhiqiang uploaded a 75-second-long video titled "Xiao Xiao" on the newly formed Newgrounds animation portal, inspired by Hong Kong martial arts films. The series included stick figures fighting each other, and took on a variety of formats, including animation and video games.

=== xkcd ===
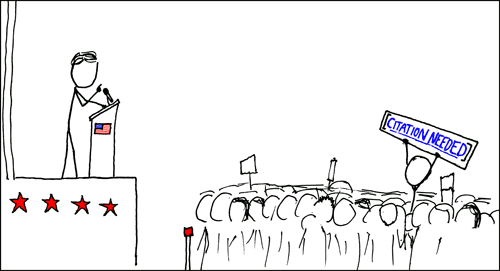
An example of usage of stick figures in an xkcd comic.

In September 2005, American NASA engineer Randall Munroe debuts xkcd, a webcomic which uses stick figures in humorous contexts, often relating to Science, Philosophy, Technology, Computer programming, and Internet culture. Randall has since authored 6 books in relation to the comic.

=== Animator vs. Animation ===
Created by animator, YouTuber, and artist Alan Becker, the first episode of Animator vs. Animation premiered on Newgrounds on June 3, 2006, using flash animation. It showed a stick figure fighting to break out of the animation program it was created in. The video has garnered almost 80 million views since its publication. As of May 2026, the series contain fourteen main episodes and a number of spin-offs, among them include the video "Animation vs. Minecraft", which has gained over 352 million views as of 9 October 2026. Season 3 in the series of episodes features multiple styles of stick figures, including a cave painting character, a stickman similar to the one in Stickman vs. Wall, a figure seemingly from Pivot Animator, and a figure based on those in DOT pictograms. In total, all of Alan Becker's animation videos have been watched over 9.9 billion times, with the vast majority of them being centered around stick figure animation.

=== Pivot Animator ===
Pivot Animator (formerly Pivot Stickfigure Animator) was created in 2005 by software developer Peter Bone. The program was specifically geared towards stick figure animation. Unlike Adobe Flash, which had grown into a highly complex 2D animation environment, Pivot Animator, with its simplicity allowed virtually anyone to create stick figure animations without requiring any form of expertise. This brought the ability to create and distribute quality stick animations to a much greater audience than before, and alongside Flash, Pivot Animator soon became another central tool for the countless Internet users who were caught up in the trend after Animator vs. Animation's success.

=== This is Bob ===
At some point between June 2008 and April 2009, an Internet copypasta began to appear featuring a Unicode stick figure named Bob. There was an initial surge in popularity in April 2009, leading to a hostile response from the YouTube community wherein the community would flag the copypasta as spam. This spread of the copypasta would reach its peak in search interest around June 2010 before declining gradually. However, on September 24, 2013, YouTube announced that they would be integrating the YouTube Comments section with Google+. In response, the YouTube community brought back the Bob copypasta in a new form, with Bob "building an army" against Google+.

=== Other notable events ===
- January 19, 2001: Animator Rob_D creates the popular series Cyanide & Happiness, the first episode of Joe Zombie's debut with more cinematic, although still very rudimentary, stickman animation. The original series lasted three episodes before being rebooted with better graphics in October.
- December 24, 2008: Flipnote, another competitor to Adobe Flash and Pivot, is released. While not as popular as the aforementioned two, Flipnote did serve a role in the productions of stick figure media until the software's termination in 2018.
- November 18, 2010: The first episode of Dick Figures, an adult animated web series created by Ed Skudder and Zack Keller, is published on YouTube by Mondo Media. The series finished with over 50 episodes and 250 million views.

== Unicode ==
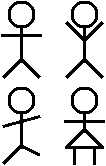
Four of the Unicode stick figures (U+1FBC8 is omitted.)

As of Unicode version 13.0, there are five stick figure characters in the Symbols for Legacy Computing block. These are in the codepoints U+1FBC5 to U+1FBC9.

As of Unicode version 16.0, there are stick figure characters in the Symbols for Legacy Computing Supplement block. These are in the codepoints U+1FBC5 to U+1FBC9.

OpenMoji supports the five characters along with joining character sequences to give the other figures a dress. For example, the sequence U+1FBC6 🯆 STICK FIGURE WITH ARMS RAISED, U+200D ZERO WIDTH JOINER, U+1F457 👗 DRESS (🯆‍👗).

Unicode stick figure characters
Codepoint	Name	Character	Notes
U+1FBC5	STICK FIGURE	🯅	Not to be mistaken with U+1F6B9 🚹 MENS SYMBOL
U+1FBC6	STICK FIGURE WITH ARMS RAISED	🯆	
U+1FBC7	STICK FIGURE LEANING LEFT	🯇	Mirror images of each other.
U+1FBC8	STICK FIGURE LEANING RIGHT	🯈	Mirror images of each other.
U+1FBC9	STICK FIGURE WITH DRESS	🯉	Not to be mistaken with U+1F6BA 🚺 WOMENS SYMBOL

== See also ==
A mysterious sequence from The Adventure of the Dancing Men

- 1903 – In Arthur Conan Doyle's story The Adventure of the Dancing Men, Sherlock Holmes deciphers messages encoded as sequences of stick figures.
- 1908 – Emile Cohl's pioneer animated film Fantasmagorie features a stick figure as its main character.
- Tidyman (Keep Britain Tidy)
- Tadpole person
- Ampelmännchen
