= Animator vs. Animation =

American animated web series

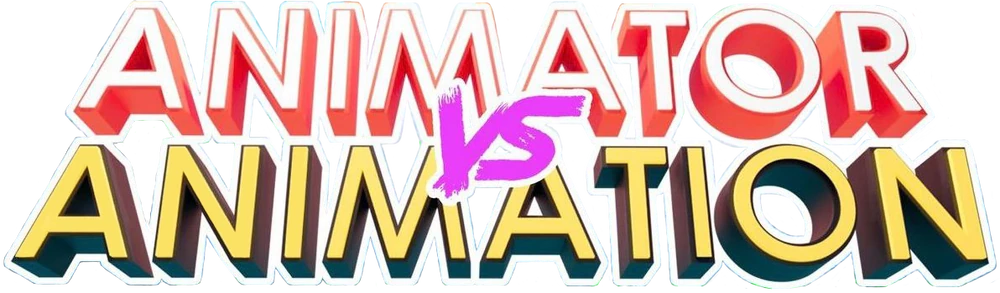
- Also known as: AVA
- Genre: Action-adventure; Science fiction; Comedy-drama
- Created by: Alan Becker
- Written by: Alan Becker; Skim
- Directed by: Alan Becker; Skim; guzzu
- Composers: AaronGrooves; Scott Buckley
- Country of origin: United States
- Original language: English
- No. of seasons: 3
- No. of episodes: 14

Production
- Producers: Alan Becker; Skim
- Running time: 2–20 minutes

Original release
- Network: Newgrounds
- Release: June 3, 2006 – October 2, 2014
- Network: Atom.com
- Release: November 4, 2006 – October 4, 2010
- Network: YouTube
- Release: September 12, 2007 – present

Related
- Animation vs. Minecraft Shorts; Animation vs. Education

Animator vs. Animation (AvA) is an American animated web series created by Alan Becker. The original animation was first published on Newgrounds on June 3, 2006, with a sequel following five months later. Almost every installment is animated in either Adobe Animate or Blender, with live-action scenes also being incorporated into the series, starting with the fourth episode.

The premise of the web series is a stick figure attempting to escape the animation program in which it was created, either by using the built-in animation tools or through sheer brute force. The series contains almost no spoken dialogue.

Known for its unique concept and high-quality animation, it became an immediate internet hit, receiving 4.78 stars on Newgrounds and 80 million views on YouTube. The fourth installment gained almost 5 million views on YouTube within a month.

A Kickstarter campaign for a reboot episode of the series was created on July 10, 2013, reaching their $10,000 funding goal on August 9, 2013. The episode was released on October 2, 2014.

Two game adaptations have been created or are in development for the series. In 2006, Charles Yeh developed a browser game titled Animator vs. Animation Game: SE. On March 26, 2025, Animation VERSUS, a fighting game, was successfully funded on Kickstarter, which is currently in development and set to be released in 2028.

== Characters ==
=== Humans ===
- "The Animator" (a self-insert of Alan Becker): The titular character. He was initially an antagonist who showed disdain towards his creations, before redeeming himself and showing more care to them after learning that one of them (The Second Coming) was sentient and could talk through text.

=== Artificial stick figures ===
Four hollow-headed stick figures all created by the Animator at different points in the story.

- victim [sic] (later named H4CK3R): A black, later dark gray stick figure created on June 3, 2006 by the Animator, who was cruelly tortured for amusement by the Animator until he successfully escaped the computer, but was left deeply traumatized. He is characterized by resourcefulness, enabling his escape by secretly engineering a rocket. Once freed, he co-founded a technology company called Rocket Corp with his newly-met friend, Mitsi. After her sudden death, he became driven to avenge her. Following his ploy of tricking the Animator into renaming him to H4CK3R, he is granted technological abilities, such as digital manipulation.
- The Chosen One (TCO) (temporarily named NO ONE): A black stick figure, originally almost identical in appearance to victim, created on March 15, 2007 by the Animator. After collaborating with The Dark Lord against the Animator and escaping the computer, he initially followed him on his violent rampages across the internet, until a later change of heart in ethics and disagreement with The Dark Lord's release of the ViraBot virus, rendering them enemies again. His powers include pyrokinesis, ice manipulation, laser vision and enhanced strength, which are lost after he is renamed to NO ONE by H4CK3R, until The Animator reversed it.
- The Dark Lord (TDL): A bright red stick figure, created by the Animator on October 2, 2011, (Note: While this character's debut episode was released on Atom.com on October 11, 2010, Becker confirmed in "The Flashback" that the events took place on October 2, 2011, the day the episode was officially uploaded to YouTube.) programmed solely with the mission of destroying The Chosen One. He possesses flight and pyrokinesis abilities, which are later enhanced after partially merging with the ViraBot virus. He is an aggressive and sadistic thrill-seeker, deriving enjoyment from committing acts of violence and destruction. He has also shown cunning and ingenuity when creating the ViraBot virus, designed to cause chaos across the internet.
- The Second Coming, the main protagonist.
  The Second Coming (TSC) (also known as Orange): An orange stick figure accidentally created by the Animator on October 2, 2014, who has an innate talent for art and animation. He assumes leadership over his group of friends, the Fighting Stick Figures, and collectively they are known as the Color Gang or Stick Gang. Initially, he differed little from them aside from his distinctive head shape, until he is revealed to possess latent abilities such as telekinesis, flight, laser vision, resurrection, etc. His ability to bring life to any drawing he creates using the pencil tool is also inherent to him.

=== Fighting Stick Figures ===
A group of four solid-headed stick figures consisting of Red, Blue, Yellow, and Green were introduced on October 2, 2014. They originally resided on a website called sticksfight.com, until meeting The Second Coming who introduced them to the world outside.

The concrete characterizations of the Fighting Stick Figures are predominantly developed in the Animator vs. Minecraft spin-off, where their personalities and interests unique to them are more prominently exhibited.

- Red: A red stick figure that loves animals and is proficient in close-quarters combat. He is mischievous and the most impulsive of the Stick Gang.
- Blue: A cyan stick figure who is knowledgeable in farming, cooking, and brewing potions. Due to his calm and pacifist nature, he's been described as a "hippie" and has an addiction to nether wart in the Animation vs. Minecraft spin-off.
- Yellow: A yellow stick figure skilled in engineering and computer programming. He is characterized as the technically-inclined of the group.
- Green: A lime stick figure who has musical talent. He is quick at learning and often flaunts his skills. As a result of his arrogance, he tends to be picked on by his friends, or karmically punished by the narrative.

=== Mercenaries ===
A group of four stick figures with unique designs and fighting styles, who work under victim's orders. Excluding Ballista, the mercenaries lack official names and are only being referred to with community-created nicknames.

- "Agent": A thin, dark gray stick figure of above average height who wears sunglasses. He has a solid white head with a dark gray outline, identical to his body, and possesses a toolbar that allows him to use animation tools. His non-canon production name is G.U.I..
- "Hazard": A pictogram portrayed as nonchalant and comical. He has control over any pictogram sign, whose meaning or symbol he can freely manipulate. His non-canon production name is Sign.
- "Primal": A tall, brown stick figure in the style of a cave drawing with keen senses that acts on immediate instinct and raw power. He can manifest primitive weapons such as a spear or a bow and arrow. He is also capable of shapeshifting, either into a more robust form or into an animal, like a deer. His non-canon production name is Lasco.
- Ballista: A short pixelated stick figure that can shapeshift and is short-tempered. He's a crossover character from an animation made in 2003, The Door won't Open, Let's Break It (ドアが開かないぶち破ろう, Doa ga akanai buchi yaburou). His non-canon production name is EZToon, named after the animation program he was created in.

=== Others ===
- ViraBots: A computer virus created by The Dark Lord that takes the form of red robotic spiders. Much like their creator, they are aggressive and hostile.
- Mitsi: A white graphic figure in a grey dress with dark hair, who was victim's first friend, and the co-founder of Rocket Corp. She is kind-hearted, having helped victim overcome his trauma.
- Corn Dog Guy: A brown stick figure, who is an opportunistic businessman that runs a corn dog stand in the Outernet. He is exclusive to the Actual Shorts series, but makes a small cameo later in Animator vs. Animation.

== Episodes ==
Season	Episodes	Originally released	
Season	Episodes	First released	Last released
1	4	June 3, 2006	October 2, 2014
2	4	August 19, 2018	October 24, 2020
3	6	April 29, 2023	TBA

=== Season 1 (2006–14) ===
No. overall	No. in series	Title	Directed by	Original release date
1	1	"Animator vs. Animation"	Alan Becker	June 3, 2006
The Animator (Alan Becker) creates a black stick figure in Macromedia Flash (now known as Adobe Animate), naming it "victim", after which the stick figure comes to life. Alan immediately engages in combat with victim, fighting with the tools of Flash itself. Alan eventually closes Flash, seemingly erasing victim and the project file in the process.
2	2	"Animator vs. Animation 2"	Alan Becker	March 15, 2007
Alan creates another black stick figure, this time naming it "The Chosen One", making the stick figure even more powerful based on in-universe rules established by a discussion between Alan and an AIM friend. This time, The Chosen One jumps onto Alan's desktop and destroys his desktop applications and files, while Alan struggles to subdue him. Before the computer is shut down, The Chosen One is recognised as a virus by Alan's antivirus software, Avast, and is swiftly captured. This allows the animator to force The Chosen One to work as a pop-up blocker.
3	3	"Animator vs. Animation 3"	Alan Becker	October 11, 2010
Years after becoming Alan's ad blocker, The Chosen One comes across a way to escape. Despite Alan's attempts to stop him, The Chosen One frees himself and starts destroying applications on the PC like he did before. While The Chosen One is distracted, Alan quickly draws a bright red stick figure, naming it "The Dark Lord", and programs him with the directives to fight The Chosen One, who eventually defeats The Dark Lord and convinces him to join his side. The two team up to terminate Alan's computer by creating a vortex that sucks everything up and explodes, crashing the desktop in the process.
4	4	"Animator vs. Animation 4"	Alan Becker	October 2, 2014
Three years later, Alan is animating an orange stick figure whilst chatting with a friend online about the events of the previous episode. While Alan is away from the computer, the orange stick figure comes alive and finds a website where he meets and befriends a group of four other stick figures. When Alan returns, he immediately goes to delete the four stick figures and realizes that the orange stick figure is called The Second Coming, described by Task Manager as "The Chosen One's Return". Unable to be deleted, The Second Coming sends Alan a message that says: "You ended my friends. Now I will end you." After a long battle on Alan's phone and computer, The Second Coming destroys Alan's cursor and creates his own animations to further the destruction. After Alan deletes the animations, The Second Coming begs for mercy. Impressed by The Second Coming's animation skills, Alan spares him and refreshes the website to bring the other stick figures back. The two agree on a deal that The Second Coming and his friends can live as long as he teaches animation to Alan and does not break his computer.
Compilation
–	–	"Animator vs Animation Season 1"	Alan Becker	July 20, 2024
A compilation of the first four episodes reuploaded together, with adjustments made to the first three episodes to fill widescreen 16:9 aspect ratios. Sound effects were also replaced with higher quality versions of the originals.

=== Season 2 (2018–20) ===
No. overall	No. in series	Title	Directed by	Original release date
5	1	"The Virus"	Alan Becker	August 19, 2018
One day, as Alan and The Second Coming are animating together, a computer virus program named "ViraBot" appears to have infected the computer. As Alan and The Second Coming try to remove it, a red, four-legged spider-like creature emerges from the program's icon, seemingly able to disintegrate anything. Despite their efforts, The Second Coming and his friends fail to destroy the ViraBot. Before ViraBot can kill The Second Coming, a portal is opened and The Chosen One, revealed to still be alive, comes out to challenge the ViraBot.
6	2	"The Chosen One's Return"	Alan Becker	October 28, 2018
The Chosen One and the ViraBot engage in battle, with the former proving himself immune to the latter's deletion powers. Despite struggling, The Chosen One eventually manages to destroy the ViraBot. As the Stick Gang bows down to The Chosen One in respect and gratitude, The Chosen One creates a second portal and leaves the computer. Hesitant at first, the Stick Gang follows him.
7	3	"The Flashback"	Alan Becker	March 12, 2019
In a flashback, it is shown that at the end of "Animator vs. Animation 3", The Chosen One and The Dark Lord escaped Alan's computer before it was destroyed. Afterwards, the two start terrorizing the Internet and various websites. As time goes on, their destructive rampages begin to wear on The Chosen One's conscience. Years later, in a digital world called the Outernet, The Dark Lord invents the ViraBot, a destructive virus that can disintegrate anything, to the disapproval of The Chosen One. After failing to prevent him from launching it, The Chosen One goes to save the person it was sent to, despite discovering that this person is his creator Alan. Back in the present day, The Chosen One and the Stick Gang travel across the portal to the Outernet.
8	4	"The Showdown"	Alan Becker	October 24, 2020
Back in the Outernet, The Chosen One tracks down The Dark Lord and engages him in an intense battle. As The Dark Lord gains the upper hand, Yellow, knowledgeable in programming, hacks his computer to summon Alan's cursor so he can assist The Chosen One, forcing The Dark Lord to send out an army of ViraBots to defeat his opponents. After disintegrating Alan's cursor, The Dark Lord kills The Second Coming's friends one by one before gravely injuring The Second Coming himself. In an unexpected display of power greater than either The Chosen One's or The Dark Lord's, The Second Coming suddenly activates his abilities, destroys the ViraBots, and kills The Dark Lord in a giant explosion. After using The Dark Lord's computer to revive his friends and Alan's cursor, he passes out. The Second Coming wakes up with no recollection of having such powers, leaving The Chosen One as the only character alive that knows about them. The Stick Gang returns to the computer.
Compilation
–	–	"Animator vs. Animation Season 2"	Alan Becker	December 5, 2020
A compilation of episodes 5-8, with edits made to fix continuity errors and alter the soundtrack.

=== Season 3 (2023–) ===
No. overall	No. in series	Title	Directed by	Original release date
9	1	"Wanted"	Alan Becker	April 29, 2023
The Chosen One is pursued by four mercenaries and, having witnessed The Second Coming's powers, seeks him out for help. Although The Chosen One is unable to restore The Second Coming’s memories or activate his dormant abilities, he nevertheless brings him to the Outernet to defeat the mercenaries, this time again followed by the Stick Gang. The Second Coming, having brought a pencil from Alan's computer, starts drawing animations to defend himself and The Chosen One, but is ultimately defeated by the mercenary leader, Agent. The remaining members of the Stick Gang witness the pair being transported away by the mercenaries, who deliver them to an organization called Rocket Corp where they are imprisoned, with The Chosen One placed inside a white containment box. There, the mercenaries report to their leader, a dark gray stick figure who is later revealed to be victim.
10	2	"The Box"	Alan Becker	November 4, 2023
The Fighting Stick Figures attempt to locate Rocket Corp and eventually stow away on a transport truck to reach its facility, where The Second Coming is taken for research on his drawing-based abilities. Inside the building, victim enters the containment box to torture and interrogate The Chosen One about Alan’s whereabouts, and when he refuses to answer, victim initiates a memory scan. The scan inadvertently exposes The Second Coming’s powers to everyone present—including The Second Coming himself, who is returned to his cell as the process continues. As the memory reveals how Yellow previously summoned Alan’s cursor, the organization identifies his location and Agent soon abducts him from the facility’s parking lot.
11	3	"Victim"	Alan Becker	December 14, 2024
In a flashback set after the events of "Animator vs. Animation", victim is shown to have been repeatedly revived and killed by Alan for several months. Eventually, he builds a rocket to escape into the Internet, which follows a stick figure animation file called Mitsi as it is uploaded to Newgrounds. The file enters the Outernet, where she manifests into existence, while victim's rocket lands nearby. The two quickly grow close, as victim uses his tools to help others, eventually establishing Rocket Corp. Agent is hired as his mercenary and becomes their friend. On the company’s fourth anniversary party, numerous stick figures abruptly vanish — including Mitsi and Agent — and are forcefully returned to Newgrounds, under siege from the Chosen One and the Dark Lord. Agent watches as Mitsi is killed by a fireball and sees the Chosen One soon after. After returning to the Outernet, Agent's memories are scanned by victim, leading him to believe the Chosen One killed Mitsi. Seven years later, victim witnesses footage of the Chosen One alongside Alan’s cursor and concludes that the two are working together.
12	4	"Hacker"	Alan Becker & Skim	September 13, 2025
While the Second Coming tries meditating in hopes of unlocking his hidden powers, Agent scans Yellow's memories to learn how he summoned Alan’s cursor. He and victim leave to find the Dark Lord's former hideout and take the Chosen One with them, while Red, Green, and Blue infiltrate Rocket Corp to save Yellow and the Second Coming. They subsequently encounter and defeat the other mercenaries. Agent successfully summons Alan's cursor and tricks him into renaming victim as H4CK3R, granting him tech-based reality-warping abilities. H4CK3R depowers the Chosen One by renaming him to NO ONE and forces his way onto Alan’s computer, where they fight. After destroying his cursor, H4CK3R begins destroying all of Alan's personal files and photos, leading him to unplug his computer. Having completed his quest for revenge, H4CK3R is suddenly approached by the Dark Lord — revealed to have been restored by his ViraBots. He offers an alliance by claiming he can resurrect Mitsi. Initially hesitant, H4CK3R accepts his proposal.
13	5	"The Machine"	Alan Becker & Skim	May 30, 2026
Red, Green, and Blue rescue Yellow and disguise themselves as Rocket Corp workers, while the Dark Lord, H4CK3R, and Agent return with NO ONE. Learning of the Second Coming's resurrection ability, H4CK3R constructs a machine to harness it, but the Dark Lord secretly infects it with a ViraBot. Mitsi is restored without her memories, and H4CK3R soon discovers that the Dark Lord killed her, leading to an intense fight. The Fighting Stick Figures are captured by the Mercenaries, but the Dark Lord kills H4CK3R, though he successfully restores Mitsi's memories before fading. H4CK3R is revived under the Dark Lord's control, and they massacre all the Rocket Corp. employees, including Agent, who are also revived as subjugated puppets. The Second Coming awakens his hidden powers, but H4CK3R disables them. When Hazard throws a nuclear bomb to kill the Dark Lord, the Fighting Stick Figures, Mercenaries, NO ONE, and Mitsi take cover. The Dark Lord survives through H4CK3R's powers, before using debris to construct a tower-like fortress around the Machine. In the aftermath, Mitsi recovers the Second Coming's pencil from the ruins.
14	6	"The Dark Age"	Alan Becker & Skim	November 7, 2026
The Dark Lord takes over much of the Outernet, killing and resurrecting its populace under his control. Mitsi rescues NO ONE and frees the Second Coming from the Machine, but he remains unconscious from having his powers spent. Their escape is noticed by the Dark Lord, who orders H4CK3R to disperse their puppets across the planet. Before they can be captured, Green and Primal rescue them. The party retreats to a distant base where the rest of the Fighting Stick Figures and mercenaries hide. Yellow unsuccessfully attempts to contact Alan, just as the Dark Lord's army approaches. The Second Coming regains consciousness, and using the pencil, he draws a telephone to call Alan for help. After Yellow connects his computer to the Outernet and provides him with a digital avatar, Alan accesses and grants the hidden powers of Mitsi and the Fighting Stick Figures to stand against the Dark Lord. Though he fails to access the Second Coming's powers, he renames NO ONE back to the Chosen One, restoring his powers.

== Development and history ==
Becker was born in Dublin, Ohio on May 18, 1989. He graduated from Scioto High School in 2007, and attended Columbus College of Art and Design, graduating in 2013.

Becker was inspired by many popular animations and stories, such as Duck Amuck and the 1959 animated version of Harold and the Purple Crayon. Many other Flash games, such as Cursor Thief on Newgrounds, also gave him the spark to create the animation. His first official animation, titled Pink Army, was posted on Newgrounds in 2006. Becker created his YouTube channel on the 24th of July that same year. Approximately three months after starting the animation, Becker posted it to Newgrounds. The next day, the animation received second place for the entire day. Becker began receiving numerous emails and instant messages from website owners who wanted to host the animation on their websites, with one of the websites even offering $75, provided they received exclusive rights to the animation. Becker declined after reading an email above from Steven Lerner, the owner of Albino Blacksheep.

AtomFilms offered to fund the making of a sequel, which was released on November 4, 2006. Becker used his real AIM username in the animation, which made him unable to use the service without his desktop screen being flooded by hundreds of fans who attempted to message him online. Becker began uploading the videos to YouTube, manually reporting clones of the videos using YouTube's copyright report system, but it reportedly took several years. Becker uploaded "Animator vs. Animation 3" onto Atom.com on October 4, 2010, intending for it to be the final episode. He then went on to study animation at the Columbus College of Art and Design and tried to get an internship at Pixar but was rejected twice, with Becker seeking offers from smaller companies. Becker launched a Kickstarter campaign for the funding of Animator vs. Animation 4 after being motivated by his teacher's words and encouragement to keep going. The campaign launched on July 10, 2013, and the $10,000 funding goal was reached on August 9, 2013. On October 2, 2014, "Animator vs. Animation 4" was released onto YouTube. It reportedly gained almost five million views on YouTube within a month.

=== eBaum's World controversy ===
"Animator vs. Animation" was uploaded to eBaum's World without Becker's permission and proper credit. Legal action was threatened against eBaum's World under the Digital Millennium Copyright Act of 1998. eBaum's World later contacted Becker, offering him $250 as compensation and pressuring Becker into a false testimonial. Becker later retracted the statement and officially requested that eBaum's World remove the animation and testimonial from the website.

== Other media ==
=== Game adaptations ===
In 2006, a browser game adaptation titled Animator vs. Animation Game: SE was released for Adobe Flash Player, developed by Charles Yeh. On March 26, 2025, a Kickstarter campaign was launched for Animation VERSUS, a fighting game. The project's goal of $130,000 was reached in 5 hours. The game is currently in development with the help of Muno, who created a Rivals of Aether mod featuring characters from the series.

=== Spin-offs ===
A spinoff called "Animation vs. Minecraft" was uploaded on December 14, 2015. The video briefly had the title of the most popular Minecraft video on the internet for a month. It later became a full-blown series, alternating between slice-of-life and serialized storytelling, debuted on November 17, 2017. Its fourteenth episode briefly became the most popular Minecraft video on the internet, and it remains Becker's most popular video.

Another spinoff, "Animation vs. YouTube", featured cameo appearances from numerous YouTubers, including PewDiePie and Markiplier. Actual Shorts are shorts formatted for YouTube Shorts, with the name referencing the fact that most episodes in the Animation vs. Minecraft "Shorts" series are too long to be considered shorts, with running times of up to thirty minutes.

Other miscellaneous spin-offs include:

- Animation vs. League of Legends
- Animation vs. Pokémon
- Animation vs. Super Mario Bros
- Animation vs. Arcade Games
- Animation vs. Geometry Dash
- Animation vs. Sonic
- Animation vs. Education (edutainment)

== Reception ==
The series has gained a generally positive reception.

=== Awards and nominations ===
Year	Award	Category	Animation	Result	Ref
2007	Webby Awards	"People's Voice" Award	"Animator vs. Animation II"	Won	
2014	Cleveland International Film Festival	"Best of Ohio" Award	"Animator vs. Animation IV"	Nominated	
2024	Independent Media Initiative	unknown	"Animation vs. Math"	Won	

== See also ==
- Flash animation
- Stick figure
