= Fantasmagorie (film) =

1908 short film by Émile Cohl

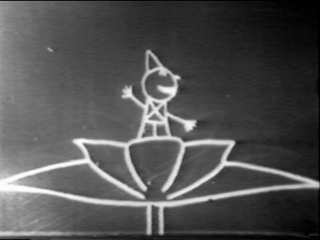
- A still from the film
- Directed by: Émile Cohl
- Produced by: Émile Cohl
- Animation by: Émile Cohl
- Distributed by: Société des Etablissements L. Gaumont
- Release date: 17 August 1908
- Running time: 1 minute, 45 seconds (including the titles); 1 minute, 20 seconds (standalone animation)
- Country: France
- Language: None / Silent film

Fantasmagorie (also called 'A Fantasy') is a 1908 French animated short film by Émile Cohl. It is one of the earliest examples of traditional (hand-drawn) animation, and considered by film historians to be the first animated cartoon.

== Description ==
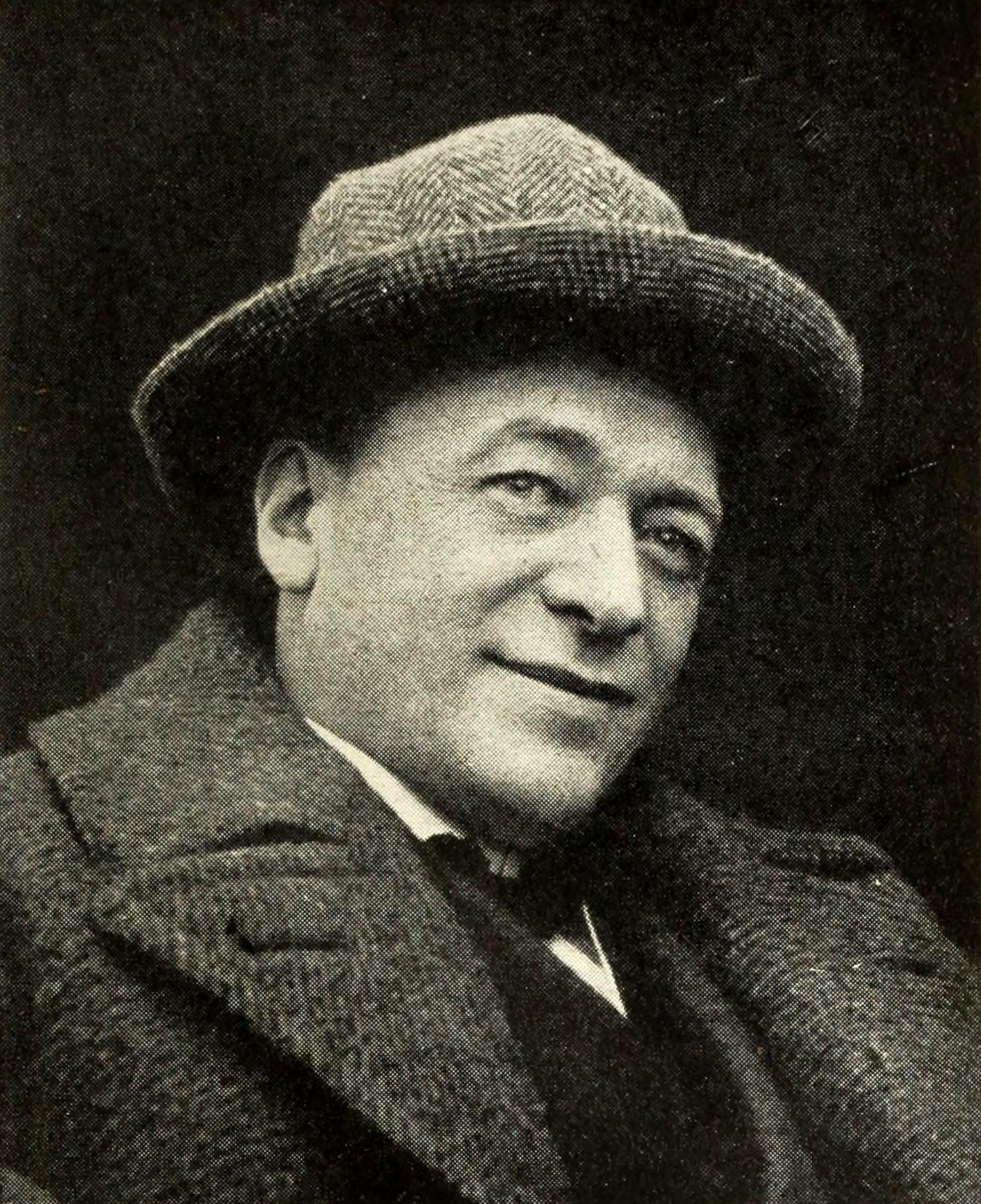
Émile Cohl, the creator of Fantasmagorie

The film largely consists of a stick man moving about and encountering all manner of morphing objects, such as a wine bottle that transforms into a flower which becomes an elephant. There are also sections of live action where the animator's hands enter the scene. The main character is drawn by the artist's hand on camera, and the main characters are a clown and a gentleman. Other characters include a woman in a movie theater wearing a large hat with gigantic feathers, and a strongman.

The film, in all of its wild transformations, is a direct tribute to the by-then forgotten Incoherent movement. The title is taken from the original French word for "phantasmagoria", a mid-19th century magic lantern show with moving images of ghosts.

== History ==
Fantasmagorie (1908)

Cohl worked on Fantasmagorie from February to either May or June 1908. Despite the short running time, the piece was packed with material devised in a stream of consciousness style. The film was released on 17 August 1908.

=== Production ===
The film was created by drawing each frame on paper and then shooting each frame onto negative film, which gave the picture a blackboard look. It was made up of 700 drawings, each of which was exposed twice (animated "on twos"), leading to a running time of almost two minutes.

Cohl probably copied the blackboard-style from J. Stuart Blackton's Humorous Phases of Funny Faces (1906).

== Physical film registries ==
Multiple versions of Fantasmagorie are preserved in film archives, including:

- Academy Film Archive - Holds a 16 mm print of the film, described as the only surviving full-frame copy. The print was sourced by Serge Bromberg, then artistic director of the Annecy International Animation Film Festival, for the festival's 2008 edition to commemorate the 100th anniversary of the film's release.
  This print was donated to the Academy Film Archive by David Shepard, who received the film from his high school friend John Doublier. Doublier's grandfather, Francis Doublier, was a Lumière operator sent to the United States in 1902 to establish the Lumière North American Company in Burlington, Vermont, at the request of the Lumière brothers.
- Gaumont - Holds a 35 mm copy of the film, recorded from the Academy Film Archive's 16 mm copy, which was digitally restored and cleaned at the request of Serge Bromberg. This copy was then scanned at 2K resolution.
  The master negative is presumed lost; like many silent-era films, it may have been destroyed through nitrate deterioration, archival neglect, or the recovery of silver from film stock.

== See also ==
- Humorous Phases of Funny Faces
- The Enchanted Drawing
- History of animation
