= Xiao Xiao =

Flash cartoon series

- Genre: Action; Dark humor Surreal humor
- Created by: Zhu Zhiqiang
- Developed by: Zhu Zhiqiang
- Voices of: Charlie Lehardy (#1); Zhu Zhiqiang (#9)
- Composer: Zhu Zhiqiang
- Country of origin: China
- Original languages: Chinese; English
- No. of episodes: 10

Production
- Executive producer: Zhu Zhiqiang
- Running time: 1-2 minutes
- Production company: XiaoXiao Movie.com

Original release
- Network: Newgrounds
- Release: April 19, 2001 – February 23, 2002

Xiao Xiao (Chinese: 小小作品; pinyin: Xiǎo Xiǎo Zuò Pǐn, lit. "Little Work") is a Chinese Internet Flash cartoon series by Beijing-based Chinese animator Zhu Zhiqiang (simplified Chinese: 朱志强; traditional Chinese: 朱志強; pinyin: Zhū Zhìqiáng).

The cartoon features stick figures performing choreographed fight scenes. Some of the cartoons are interactive and game-like. All cartoons are in the Adobe Flash format, with the exception of Xiao Xiao #1, which was originally in AVI format and converted to Flash format. Others have seized on Xiao Xiao's popularity to make animations exploiting the easy-to-draw style of stick figures and minimalist backgrounds, creating cartoons that are sequels or parodies of the official cartoons.

== Etymology ==
In Mandarin Chinese; "Xiao Xiao" is the Chinese character for "small" repeated twice. Here this reduplication connotes an affectionate diminutive, an equivalent might be the English expression "itty bitty" or "lil' old". Each Xiao Xiao cartoon is given a Chinese title with the adjective "Xiao Xiao" preceding a descriptive noun phrase. Xiao Xiao #1 was originally titled "Xiao Xiao Zuo Pin", which translates to "A Little Bit of Creative Work".

Over time, the term gradually shifted meaning from the series itself to the main character, an anonymous black stick figure.

== Legal dispute ==
In June 2004, Zhu filed a lawsuit against Nike for plagiarizing his cartoon stickmen in their commercials. Nike's representatives denied the accusations, claiming that the stickman figure lacks originality, and is public domain. Zhu eventually won the lawsuit, claiming his copyright on his style and not the stickman, and Nike was ordered to pay $36,000 to the cartoonist. Nike stated it would appeal the suit in the Beijing High People's Court. Nike won the appeal in 2006, with the judge saying in the paper that the Nike stickman design was different than Zhu's stickman design. After winning the suit, Nike stated "This was never a commercial issue for us. It was a matter of principle."
