= Émile Cohl =

French caricaturist

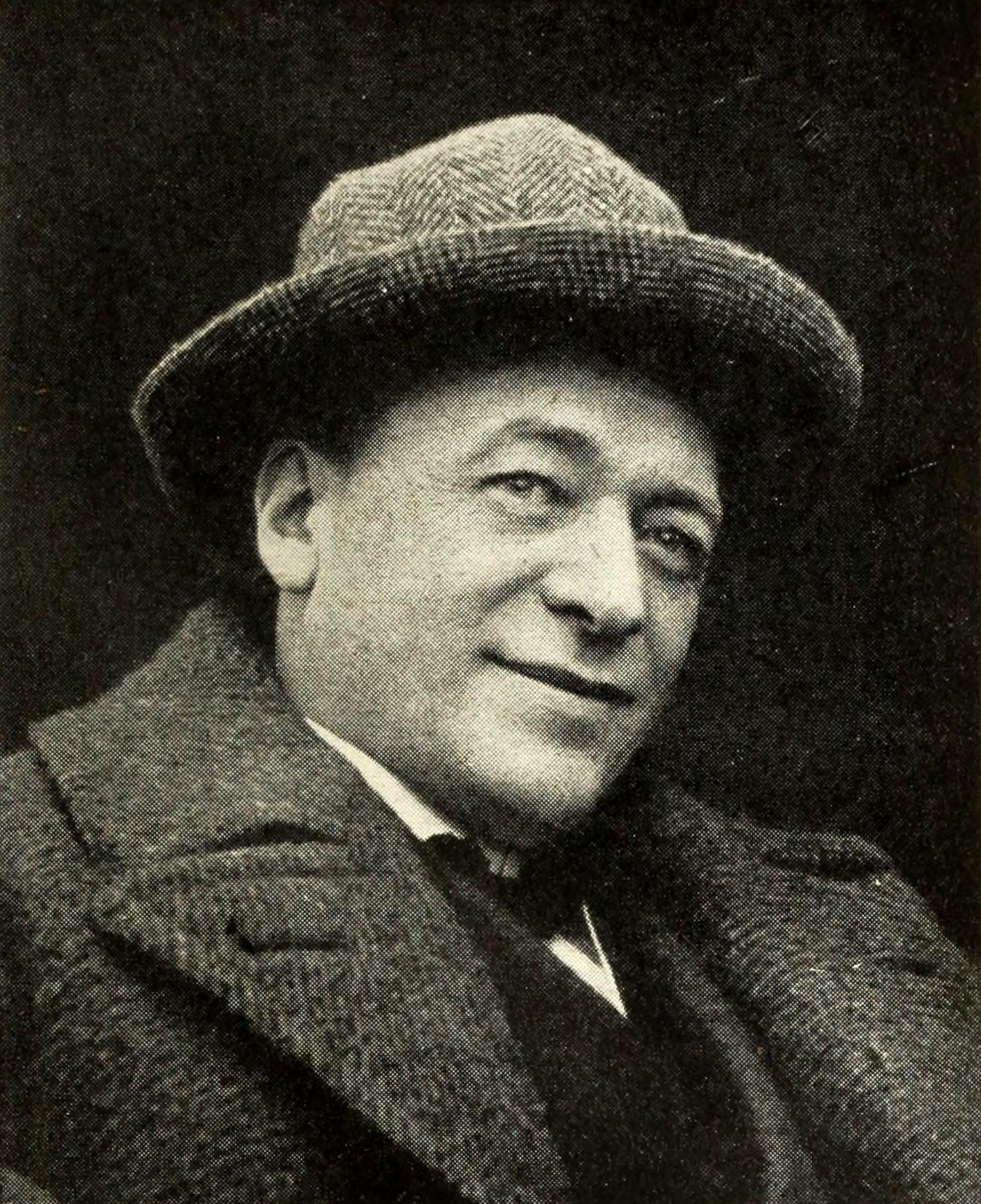
- c. 1910
- Born: 4 January 1857; Paris, France
- Died: 20 January 1938 (aged 81); Villejuif, France
- Notable work: Le Peintre néo-impressionniste
- Movement: Incoherent Movement
- Spouse(s): Unknown spouse; Suzanne Delpy (June 1896)
- Patrons: André Gill

Émile Eugène Jean Louis Cohl (French: [kol]; né Courtet; 4 January 1857 – 20 January 1938) was a French caricaturist of the Incoherent Movement, cartoonist, and animator, called "The Father of the Animated Cartoon."

== Biography ==
Émile's father, Elie, was a rubber salesman, and his mother, Emilie Laure, a linen seamstress. The rubber factory Elie worked for had many ups and downs, causing the family to move from one home in Paris to another.

=== Early years ===
Émile’s father was often busy, and Émile lived with his ailing mother until her death in 1863. In 1864, at the age of 7, he was enrolled at the Ecole professionnelle de Pantin, a boarding school known as the Institute Vaudron after its founder. There his artistic talents were discovered and encouraged. The next year, a cold kept him confined in his father's apartment, where he began stamp collecting, a hobby that would become his sole source of income several times in his life.

The chaos caused by the Franco-Prussian War and the following siege of Paris led to the closing of Elie Courtet's rubber factory. Émile was transferred to the less-exclusive Ecole Turgot, but his lessons were soon forgotten as the teenager wandered the streets of Paris to watch history being made. He made two discoveries that in time that became the controlling elements of his life: Guignol puppet theater and political caricature. Guignol was a form of drama (usually involving love triangles), in which the characters were played by marionettes. A subtype of the Guignol was Fantoche, a form of puppetry in which the puppeteer's head was stuck through a hole in a black sheet with a small puppet body underneath.

Political caricature had begun in France during the Second Empire, but had been suppressed by Napoleon III. During the free-for-all weeks of the Commune (all 11 of them), the caricaturists were free to post broadsheets on the streets for all to see. The center of this activity was the Rue du Croissant, only blocks from the Ecole Turgot.

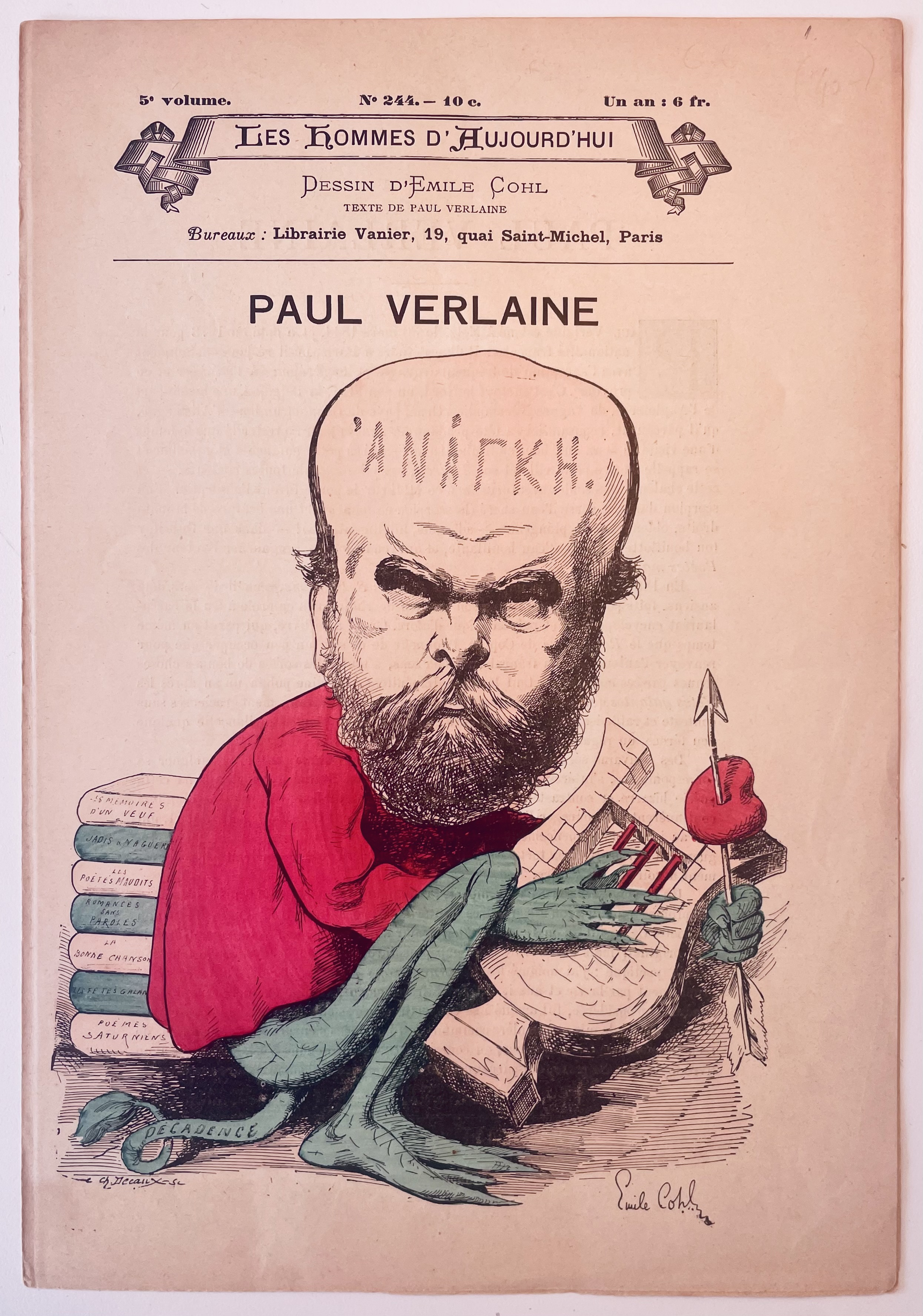
Paul Verlaine par Emile Cohl, 1896

In 1872, Elie Courtet placed his 15-year-old son in a three-year apprenticeship with a jeweler. Émile drew caricatures, enlisted in the Cherbourg regiment, and drew some more. Elie placed him with a maritime insurance broker. Émile left the broker, got a much poorer-paying job with a philatelist and declared his preference for drawing, the Bohemian lifestyle, and if necessary, going hungry.

=== Years with André Gill ===
In 1878, Émile obtained a letter of recommendation from Étienne Carjat to approach André Gill, the best-known caricaturist of the day, for a job. Gill had made his fame a decade earlier by publishing La Lune, a periodical critical of Napoleon III. His presses were smashed and he was incarcerated. He started La Lune Rousse in 1876 to continue his work. By this time, he had moved beyond attacking individuals to making observations on the ludicrousness of conformist bourgeois values in general. However, the government was becoming increasingly liberal, leaving him with few big-name targets. As a result, La Lune Rousse closed in 1879.

Émile Courtet's job as one of several assistants to Gill was to complete the backgrounds; he may have done a few of the illustrations by himself. During this process, he developed a style of caricature based on Gill's. Gill's trademark was the large, recognizable head of the target (with a fairly benign expression) atop a small puppet body (doing something ridiculous). Clearly, it was based on Fantoche puppetry. Émile took this style and added touches to suggest movement and imagery from the rest of Guignol puppetry. At about this time, he adopted the pseudonym of Émile Cohl. The meaning of "Cohl" is obscure: it may be from the pigment known as "kohl", or perhaps it means that Émile stuck to his mentor Gill like glue ("colle" in French). Perhaps it was chosen because it sounded exotic. The visual signature of a paste-pot appears in a few of Cohl's caricatures.

Adolphe Thiers was succeeded as president by Patrice MacMahon, duc de Magenta, a conservative monarchist who had been at Sedan. He became steadily less popular under the assault of caricatures. One of these, "Aveugle par Ac-Sedan", a French pun on "accidentally blind" and "Bungler at Sedan", put its creator, Émile Cohl, in jail on 11 October 1879, making him instantly famous. Three months later, MacMahon resigned in disgrace—the caricaturists liked to believe that they were responsible. He was succeeded by Jules Grévy, who transferred real power from the post of president to the prime minister and legislature. This led to a period of internal stability and prosperity for France.

Through Gill, Cohl (as he was now known) had become acquainted with an artistic circle calling themselves the Hydropathes. The group was united by various "modern" ideas and a love of poetry. The group, like many others of the time, based most of their activities on shocking people. As a result of his new-found fame, Cohl was named editor of the group's spokes-piece, L'Hydropathe, in October 1879. In 1880 he was also invited to join the Fumist group led by Alphonse Allais and Eugène Bataille. At about this time, Cohl's estranged father died, leaving him a modest legacy. Cohl set out to discover his abilities, writing and producing two satiric plays that did very poorly. The co-author of both plays was Norés (pseudonym of Edouard Norés), an American who had been an architect before giving up his former life for Bohemianism on the banks of the Seine. Besides a strong friendship, Norés taught Cohl English, a useful skill later on.

=== End of the Hydropathes ===
Cohl married on 12 November 1881; his wife later left him for an author. At the same time, André Gill was committed to the Charenton mental asylum. He managed to recover in a few months and in 1882 submitted his first serious painting, Le Fou (The Madman), to the Salon. The painting's poor reception by the artists of the Salon sent him back to Charenton.

Meanwhile, the Hydropathes disbanded in 1882. Their place in Cohl's life was replaced by the Incoherents, a group founded by Jules Lévy, who coined the phrase "les arts incohérents" as a contrast to the common expression "les arts décoratifs". The Incoherents were even less politically minded than the Hydropathes. Their slogan was "Gaity is properly French, so let's be French". The focus was absurdism, nightmares, and the drawing style of children. Cohl's Incoherent art joined his caricatures and satiric news reporting at La Nouvelle Lune, where he had become the major contributor and acting editor. He became editor in chief in November 1883.

By that time, the Incoherents had become so popular that an exhibit was arranged at the Vivienne Gallery, open to the public. It was called "an exhibition of drawings by people who do not know how to draw." Cohl's contribution was titled Portrait garanti ressemblant (Portrait—Resemblance Guaranteed). The exhibit accepted any and all entries, so long as they were not obscene or serious. The public was taken with the show, and the profits were donated to public assistance. There was a second show in 1884, and the 1885 show was replaced by a masked ball (Cohl went as an artichoke). In 1886, Cohl produced his most bizarre and characteristic work in the Incoherent vein: Abus des metaphors, a collection of more than a dozen colourful expressions brought to life.

=== Death of André Gill ===
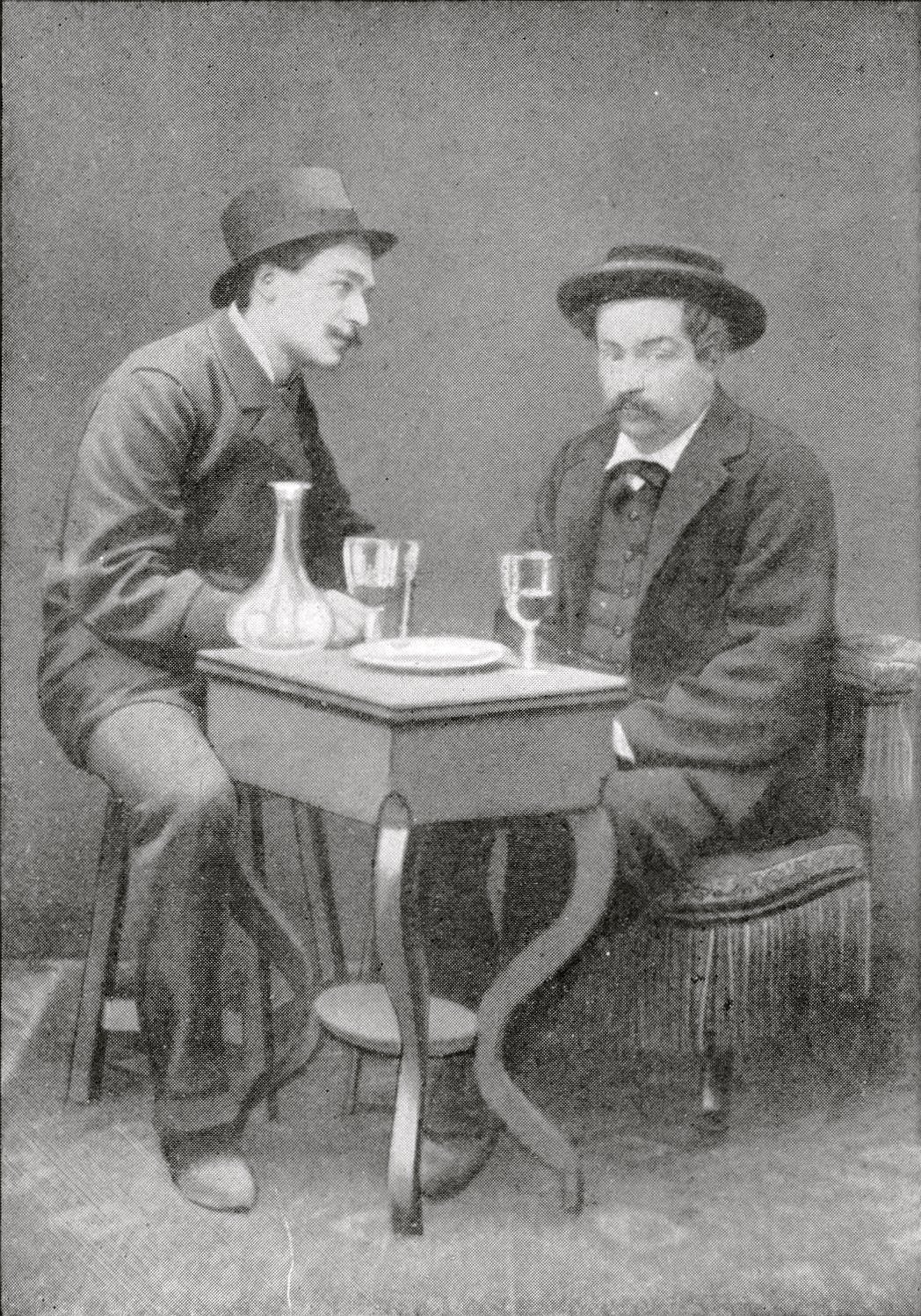
Cohl visiting Gill

Cohl's personal life was nowhere as rosy as his professional life would suggest, despite the birth of his daughter Marcelle Andrée in May 1883. Gill never recovered his sanity, and after a few months Charenton seized his property and drawings, auctioning them off to pay their bills. Cohl was unable to keep his hero in the public eye. Gill died on May Day, 1885, with only Cohl by his side. Cohl never forgot Gill's desertion by his friends and the public. The Incoherent movement collapsed in 1888.

After the collapse of his marriage, Cohl moved to London to work for Pick Me Up, a humor magazine that specialized in French artists (he left his long-standing second job as a philatelist at this time). He returned to Paris in June 1896 and married Suzanne Delpy, the daughter of one of Gill's followers. Their son André Jean was born on 8 November 1899. By this time, Cohl had moved away from caricature, sending humorous drawings to bicycle magazines, family magazines, and children's magazines. He also wrote articles on French history, stamps, and fishing. In July 1898, he started contributing to L'Illustré National. This would become the origin of Cohl's comic strips. At the same time, Cohl's art moved from scene-setting to story-telling, and from the Gill fantoche style to Impressionism. Other interests during this period included puzzles, toys (he invented a few new ones), and drawings of figures made from wax matches. In the political arena, he submitted anti-Dreyfus illustrations to La Libre Parole Illustrée.

=== Motion pictures ===
By 1907, the 50-year-old Émile Cohl, like everyone else in Paris, had become aware of motion pictures. How he actually entered the business is shrouded in legend. According to Jean-Georges Auriol in a book published in 1930, one day Cohl was walking down the street when he spotted a poster advertising a movie obviously stolen from one of his strips. Outraged, he confronted the manager of the offending studio (Gaumont) and was hired on the spot as a scenarist (responsible for one-page story ideas for movies). The story is rather doubtful in the detail of which strip and which short film; it is also possible that the story is completely false, and that Cohl was approached for the job, either by director Etienne Arnaud or by artistic director Louis Feuillade, both of whom had once worked for caricature papers and therefore could be expected to know Cohl by reputation, if not personally.

At Gaumont, Cohl collaborated with the other directors whenever possible, learning cinematography from Arnaud and directing chases, comedies, féeries ("fairy pieces"), and pageants. But his specialty was animation. He worked in a corner of the studio with a vertically mounted Gaumont camera and a single assistant to operate it. He turned out four sequences a month for insertion in mostly live action films. Studio director Léon Gaumont, in one of his visits, dubbed him "the Benedictine".

The idea for doing animation was born from the huge success of the film The Haunted Hotel, released by Vitagraph and directed by J. Stuart Blackton. It premiered in Paris in April 1907 and there was immediately a demand for more films using its incredible object animation techniques. According to a story told by Arnaud in 1922, Gaumont had ordered his staff to figure out the "mystery of 'The Haunted Hotel'." Cohl studied the film frame by frame, and in this way discovered the techniques of animation. Cohl, who was always seeking to enlarge his reputation in later life, never corroborated this story. Also, there were a fair number of films released before 1907 with stop-motion and/or drawn animation in them, by Blackton and others, any one of which could have taught Cohl animation, if he didn't just work the technique out on his own. The main reason The Haunted Hotel is significant is the fact that it was popular enough to make the arduous work of animation profitable.

Fantasmagorie by Emile Cohl, 1908

Cohl made Fantasmagorie from February to May or June 1908. This is considered the first fully animated film. It was made up of 700 drawings, each of which was double-exposed (animated "on twos"), leading to a running time of almost two minutes. Despite the short running time, the piece was packed with material devised in a "stream of consciousness" style. It borrowed from Blackton in using a "chalk-line effect" (filming black lines on white paper, then reversing the negative to make it look like white chalk on a black chalkboard), having the main character drawn by the artist's hand on camera, and the main characters of a clown and a gentleman (this taken from Blackton's Humorous Phases of Funny Faces). The film, in all of its wild transformations, is a direct tribute to the by-then forgotten Incoherent movement. The title is a reference to the "fantasmograph", a mid-Nineteenth Century variant of the magic lantern that projected ghostly images that floated across the walls.

Fantasmagorie was released on 17 August 1908. This was followed by two more films, Le Cauchemar du fantoche ["The Puppet's Nightmare"] and Un Drame chez les fantoches ["A Puppet Drama", called The Love Affair in Toyland for American release and Mystical Love-Making for British release], all completed in 1908. These three films are united by their chalk-line style, the stick-figure clown protagonists, and the constant transformations. Cohl made the plots of these films up as he was filming them. He would put a drawing on the lightbox, photograph it, trace onto next sheet with slight changes, photograph that, and so on. This meant that the pictures did not jitter and the plot was spontaneous. Cohl had to calculate the timing in advance. The process was demanding and time-consuming, which is probably why he moved away from drawn animation after Un Drame chez les fantoches.

The rest of the films Cohl made for Gaumont involve strange transformations (Les Joyeux Microbes [The Joyous Microbes, aka The Merry Microbes (UK)] (1909)), some great matte effects (Clair de lune espagno [Spanish Moonlight, aka The Man in the Moon (US), aka The Moon-Struck Matador (UK)] (1909)), and loving puppet animation (Le Tout Petit Faust [The Little Faust, aka The Beautiful Margaret (US)] (1910)). Other films used jointed cut-outs or animated matches (the later an especial favorite of Cohl's).

Le Peintre néo-impressionniste (1910)

In his lifetime, Cohl's most famous film was Le Peintre néo-impressionniste ["The Neo-Impressionistic Painter"], made in 1910. An artist is sketching a classically draped model holding a broom as a stick-figure when a collector storms in demanding to know the progress of his work. The artist shows the collector a series of blank colored canvases (the film is color-tinted). As he gives their ridiculous titles, the collector imagines them being drawn on the canvas. For example, the red canvas is A cardinal eating lobster with tomatoes by the banks of the Red Sea. The collector is soon so delirious that he buys every blank canvas he can see. Quite obviously, the artist is not a neo-Impressionist (the name taken from the latest vogue in Paris)--he's an Incoherent.

The Cohl animated films had a large impact through their American distribution by Kleine. Many of them received rave reviews in the trade magazines, although Cohl was identified only as "Gaumont's animator". It was probably in response to Fantasmagorie that Winsor McCay made Little Nemo (1911). Motifs of Cohl's can be found in Little Nemo and later films by McCay: the dots coalescing into Little Nemo reflect effects in Un Drame Chez les Fantoches and Les Joyeux Microbes; the metamorphosis of the rose into the Princess may have been inspired by Fantasmagorie; the titular character of The Story of a Mosquito (1912) sharpening his beak comes from Un Drame Chez les Fantoches; the live-action/animation interaction of McCay throwing a pumpkin to Gertie the Dinosaur (1914) may have been an answer to the matador hurling his hatchet at the moon in Clair de lune espagnol. But if there were borrowings of Cohl by McCay, there was also a wealth of style and spirit in McCay's films that were uniquely his own.

On 30 November 1910, Cohl left Gaumont for Pathé, probably for more money. He made only two animated films before being forced into exclusively live-action work as a director of burlesques starring Jobard (Lucien Cazalis), one of the first generation of great screen comics. Cohl made ten Jobard films between March and May 1911 before leaving for a vacation. Apparently, one of these films was the origin of pixilation, the technique of applying stop-motion to human beings.

One of those two animated films was Le Ratapeur de cervelles ["Brains Repaired"], which is a rehash of Les Joyeux Microbes using a mental disease. The transformations here are some of the most remarkable (and non-sensical) of Cohl's career: as two men shake hands in profile, their heads expand into huge crossed bird beaks, filling the screen in a zoom until only their shared eye is seen, which itself expands into a bellows. The other film, La Revanche des esprits [The Spirit's Revenge] (now lost), may have been the first film to combine live-action and animation by drawing directly on the live-action film (previous work had used mattes exclusively).

In September 1911, Émile Cohl learned that his daughter Andrée had died of a miscarriage. Dissatisfied with Pathé and too proud to return to Gaumont, Cohl signed with Eclipse in September. Only two of Cohl's Eclipse films have survived; one of them, Les Exploits de Feu Follet (a.k.a. The Nipper's Transformations), is currently seen as the first Western animation film which was shown for certain in a Japanese cinema (on 15 April 1912). The Eclipse contract was not exclusive, so Cohl made films for other studios. One of these films, Campbell Soups, was his first film made for Éclair, the number three studio in France.

At the beginning of the 20th century, many early film studios in America's first motion picture industry were based in Fort Lee, New Jersey. Éclair's American studio was run by Cohl's friend Arnaud. As Éclair was moving into comedies for American audiences, it was not too hard for Arnaud to have his friend sent over the Atlantic to join him. Cohl, his wife Suzanne, and their son André sailed first class from Le Havre to New York City. At Ellis Island, he was required, for "sanitary reasons", to shave off the mustache he had worn for thirty years in honour of André Gill.

Despite the inevitable xenophobia from the locals, the French colony at Fort Lee was enthusiastic about having finally invaded the coveted American market. Cohl bought a house and settled into a typical middle-class American lifestyle. He had a considerable advantage over fellow-Éclair employees, as he was fluent in English.

Cohl had two basic assignments at Fort Lee: humorous newsreel inserts and The Newlyweds animated series. The newsreel (one of the first of its kind) was started by the Sales Company in March 1912 and continued by Universal (Éclair's distributor). The Newlyweds started life as a newspaper comic strip by George McManus in the New York ''World''. The three main characters are a fashionable woman drawn in the style of the "Gibson Girl", her obliging husband, and Baby Snookums, an absolute hellion of a child who nevertheless gets everything he wants (usually at the expense of the father). The series was popular both in the United States and in France (under the name Le Petit Ange). Cohl wanted to make the first animated series, and he liked The Newlyweds. As for McManus, he may have been convinced to sign with Cohl at the urging of his friend Winsor McCay. Prior to this point, there had been a few adaptations of comic series into films, but they were all live action. Examples include Happy Hooligan (starring J. Stuart Blackton as the title character), Buster Brown, and Mutt and Jeff (later to become a successful animated series).

Cohl began work on The Newlyweds series in November 1912, and the films began appearing in theaters in March 1913. The ads for the Newlyweds films are the oldest on record to use the phrase "animated cartoons"; as would be usual for all of the following comic adaptations, only the comic artist is mentioned in the advertising, never the animator. Cohl achieved his speed (13 Newlyweds cartoons in 13 months) by using the bare minimum of actual animation, the scenes consisting of static tableau with dialog balloons appearing above each character's head (done faithfully in the McManus style). What little motion necessary was done with hinged cut-out figures animated by stop-motion. The only ingenuity in these films lay in the transitions between tableaux, which utilised Cohl's trademark transformations. Nevertheless, Cohl had proved that commercial animation was possible. The series was an instant hit. Only one film in this series has survived, "He Poses for His Portrait" [aka "Le Portrait de Zozor" (Fr.)] (1913).

The success of the series led to an explosion of animation, all adaptations of newspaper comic strips, and few of them remembered today. Meanwhile, Cohl saw both The Story of a Mosquito and Gertie the Dinosaur live at the Hammerstein Theater in New York, and he recorded his admiration of each in his diary. For animation to be practical, it had to move beyond the techniques of Cohl (cut-outs) and McCay (tracing), both of which were arduous, single-person processes. Two men were to independently work out ways around this problem: Raoul Barré and John Randolph Bray. Barré studied art in Paris in the 1890s and was known for his pro-Dreyfus cartoons. In 1920, Cohl told the story of two unnamed visitors that Éclair had forced on him to study his techniques, techniques that they later stole to make their own series. It is possible that these two were Barré and his business partner William C. Nolan. It is possible that Cohl's obvious hostility to his visitors was the result of the knowledge that they were on opposite sides in the Dreyfus Affair. On the other hand, Barré's method for making cartoons quickly, the "slash system", is the exact opposite of Cohl's cut-out system. It is true that Barré's series, The Animated Grouch Chasers, frequently stole characters and scenarios from Cohl, but then again everyone was doing that. John Randolph Bray, in collaboration with Earl Hurd, developed the patents that nearly made them the Motion Picture Patents Company of animated film. Animation historian Michael Barrier speculates that one of Cohl's unnamed visitors may have been Bray instead of Barré.

=== World War I ===
On 11 March 1914, the Cohl family left New Jersey for Paris in response to a death in Suzanne's family. They never returned. Eight days later, a fire destroyed most of Éclair's American films, including all but two of Cohl's films (He Poses for His Portrait and Bewitched Matches [aka Les Allumettes ensorcelées (Fr.)]). The latter is the only one of the animated matches films Cohl made to survive. The American studio later moved to Tucson, Arizona. The chaos caused by the fire brought Éclair's work in France to a near-standstill. Cohl made a handful of films for Éclair in France, but the outbreak of World War I on 3 August 1914, forced those films to be held back for years before being released.

By 11 August 80% of the French film industry had enlisted or had been drafted. Cohl, at 57 years of age, was too old to fight, but he volunteered as best he could while working at Éclair. His heart was no longer in his work, for his beloved wife Suzanne was slowly dying. In 1916, American cartoons took France by storm. Gaumont imported The Animated Grouch Chasers and for the first time since the early films of Blackton, animated films were being advertised with the name and face of their animator, Raoul Barré. If Barré is the individual who "stole" Cohl's techniques, this must have made Cohl furious (it didn't help that it was his former employer that was doing all the hoopla).

It was at this moment that Cohl was approached by Benjamin Rabier, a popular illustrator of children's books. Rabier wanted Cohl to animate his characters. The producer for the series was René Navarre, a former actor who had become famous playing the anti-hero Fantomas in a series of films in 1913 and 1914. The distributor was Agence Générale Cinematographique (AGC). The trio parted company over Cohl's resentment that he was not being credited in the advertising. The series, Les Dessins animés de Benjamin Rabier (The Animated Drawings of Benjamin Rabier). starred Flambeau the War Dog. The only surviving film, Les Fiançailles de Flambeau [Flambeau's Wedding] (released 1917), has cute naturalistic characters from Rabier and coarse morbid humor from Cohl. By the time of Cohl's departure, Rabier had learned enough animation to carry on with the help of two assistants. The series lasted for several years.

Cohl continued work with Éclair throughout this debacle, mostly making newsreel inserts. Based on the few fragments that remain, the series Les Aventures des Pieds Nickelés [Adventures of the Leadfoot Gang] may have been the best work of Cohl's career. It was based on a working class comic strip by Louis Forton about a gang of anarchistic youngsters constantly getting into trouble with both the criminal underground and the law. The series was terminated by the war, as the Éclair-Journal studios were occupied to make American war propaganda.

Cohl spent the rest of the war serving his country. He joined the United States Air Service Supply as a volunteer on 11 May 1918. His son André had joined the American Transportation Division the previous November.

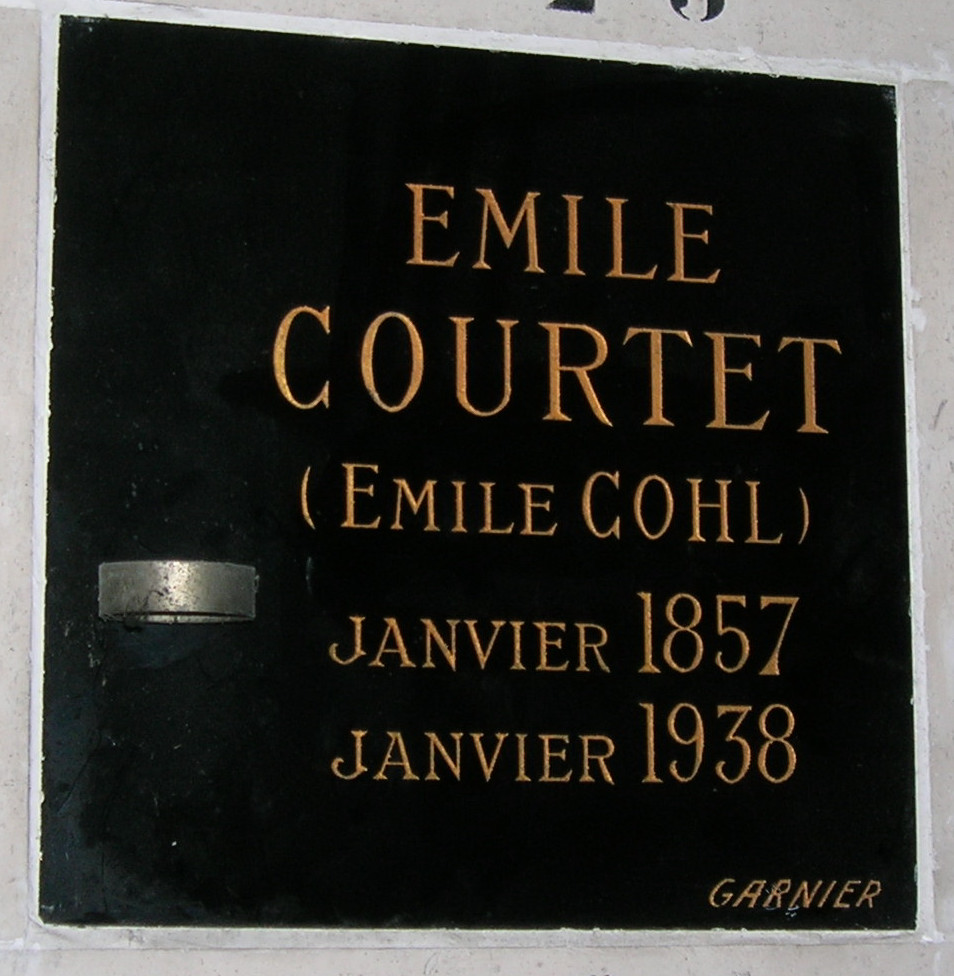
Commemorative plaque at the Père-Lachaise Cemetery

With the war over, Cohl quit Éclair in May 1920 and made his last significant film, Fantoche cherche un logement ["Puppet Looks for an Apartment"]. It was released as La Maison du fantoche ["Puppet's Mansion"] in April 1921 by AGC. The only notice paid to it in the trade journals was a one-line plot summary. Nobody cared about Cohl's work anymore, or any other French filmmaker, for that matter. Cohl's career was finished, since there was no longer any way to justify the cost of an animated short subject in a world of live-action features.

Cohl's financial situation deteriorated during the Great Depression and he endured years of severe poverty. While his peer Georges Méliès was awarded the Legion of Honor medal in 1931, scant attention was given to Cohl's pioneering work in animated film. In the spring of 1937, at the age of 80, his face was lightly burned when a candle on his desk set fire to his beard. During a couple of months stay at a charity hospital, the young film journalist René Jeanne helped organize a benefit screening of Cohl's work, which played at the Champs-Elysées Cinema on 19 January 1938, the day before Cohl's death, two weeks after his 81st birthday. Coincidentally, Georges Méliès died hours later.

Cohl's ashes are kept in the columbarium of the Père-Lachaise Cemetery, in Paris.

== Filmography as a director ==
- N.I.-Ni- C'est fini (1908)
- L'hôtel du silence (1908)
- Le violoniste (1908)
- Le veau (1908)
- Le prince Azur (1908)
- Le petit soldat qui devient Dieu (1908)
- Le mouton enragé (1908) (co-director)
- Le miracle des roses (1908)
- Le journal animé (1908)
- Le coffre-fort (1908)
- La vengeance de Riri (1908)
- L'automate (1908)
- La monnaie de mille francs (1908)
- La force de l'enfant (1908)
- La course aux potirons (1908) (co-director)
- Et si nous buvions un coup (1908)
- Blanche comme neige (1908)
- Fantasmagorie (1908)
- Le cauchemar de Fantoche (1908)
- Le cerceau magique (1908)
- Un drame chez les fantoches (1908)
- Les allumettes animées (1908)
- Les frères Boutdebois (1908)
- La séquestrée (1908)
- Un chirurgien distrait (1909)
- Monsieur Clown chez le Lilliputiens (1909)
- Moderne école (1909) (co-director)
- Les Transfigurations (1909)
- Le Spirite (1909)
- Les Locataires D'à-Côté (1909)
- Les Grincheux (1909)
- Les Chaussures Matrimoniales (1909)
- Les Chapeaux Des Belles Dames (1909)
- Le Docteur Carnaval (1909)
- L'Armée d'Agenor (1909)
- La Bataille d'Austerlitz (1909)
- Affaires de Coeur (1909)
- Soyons Donc Sportifs (1909) (co-director)
- La Valise Diplomatique (1909) (co-director)
- La Lampe Qui File (1909)
- L'Agent Du Poche (1909)
- Japon de Fantaisie (1909)
- Clair de lune espagnol (1909) (co-director)
- L'Omelette Fantastique (1909) (co-director)
- Les Beaux-Arts De Jocko (1909)
- La vie à rebours (1909)
- Pauvre Gosse (1909)
- L'éventail animé (1909) (co-director)
- Les Joyeux Microbes (1909)
- Les Couronnes I (1909)
- les Couronnes II (1909)
- Porcelaines Tendres (1909)
- Génération Spontanée (1909)
- Don Quichotte (1909)
- Le Miroir Magique (1909)
- La Ratelier De La Belle-Mère (1909)
- La Lune Dans Son Tablier (1909)
- Les Lunettes Féeriques (1909)
- Toto Devient Anarchiste (1910)
- Rien n'est impossible à l'homme (1910)
- Rêves Enfantins (1910)
- Monsieur Stop (1910)
- Mobilier Fidèle (1910)
- Les chefs-d'oeuvre de Bébé (1910)
- Les Chaînes (1910)
- Le Placier est Tenace (1910)
- Le Petit Chantecler (1910)
- Le Peintre Néo-Impressioniste (1910)
- L'Enfance De l'Art (1910)
- Le Grand Machin et le Petit Chose (1910)
- La Télécouture Sans Fil (1910)
- La Musicomanie (1910)
- Histoire de Chapeaux (1910)
- En Route (1910)
- Dix Siècles D'élégance (1910)
- Bonsoirs Russes (1910)
- Bonsoirs (1910)
- Le Binettoscope (1910)
- Champion De Puzzle (1910)
- Le Songe D'Un Garçon De Café (1910)
- Cadres Fleuris (1910)
- Le Coup De Jarnac (1910)
- Le Tout Petit Faust (1910)
- Les Douze Travaux d'Hercule (1910)
- Singeries Humaines (1910)
- Les Quatres Petits Tailleurs (1910)
- Les Fantaisies D'Agénor Maltracé (1911)
- Les Bestioles Artistes (1911]
- Le Retapeur De Cervelles (1911)
- Le Musée Des Grotesques (1911)
- Le Cheveu Délateur (1911)
- La Vengeance Des Espirits (1911)
- La Boîte Diabolique (1911)
- Jobard, Portefaix Par Amour (1911)
- Jobard ne veut pas voir les femmes travailler (1911)
- Jobard ne veut pas rire (1911)
- Jobard, garçon de recettes (1911)
- Jobard, fiancé par interim (1911)
- Jobard est demandé en mariage (1911)
- Jobard chauffeur (1911)
- Jobard change de bonne (1911)
- Jobard à tue sa grand-mère (1911)
- Jobard, amoureux timide (1911)
- C'est roulant (1911)
- Aventures d'un bout de papier (1911)
- Les Exploits de Feu Follet (1911)
- Une Poule Mouillée Qui Se Sèche (1912)
- Ramoneur Malgré Lui (1912)
- Quelle Drôle De Blanchisserie (1912)
- Poulot N'est Pas Sage (1912)
- Moulay Hafid et Alphonse XIII (1912)
- Les Métamorphoses Comiques (1912)
- Les Jouets Animes (1912)
- Les Extraordinaires Exercices De La Famille Coeur-de-Buis (1912)
- Les Exploits De Feu-Follet (1912)
- Le Prince de Galles et Fallières (1912)
- Le premier jour de vacances de Poilot (1912)
- Le marié à mal aux dents (1912)
- La Marseillaise (1912)
- La Baignoire (1912)
- Jeunes Gens à marier (1912)
- Fruits Et Légumes Vivants (1912)
- Dans La Vallée D'Ossau (1912)
- Monsieur de Crac (1912)
- Campbell Soups (1912)
- War in Turkey (1913)
- Rockefeller (1913)
- Il Joue Avec Dodo (1913)
- I Confidence (1913)
- Castro in New York (1913)
- Carte Américaine (1913)
- The Subway (1913)
- Milk (1913)
- Graft (1913)
- Coal (1913)
- When He Wants a Dog, He Wants A Dog (1913)
- Business Must Not Interfere (1913)
- Wilson and the Hats (1913)
- Wilson and the Broom (1913)
- Universal Trade Marks (1913)
- The Two Presidents (1913)
- The Police Women (1913)
- The Auto (1913)
- Poker (1913)
- Gaynor and the Night Clubs (1913)
- He Wants What He Wants When He Want It (1913)
- Poor Little Clap He Was Only Dreaming (1913)
- Wilson and the Tariffs (1913)
- The Masquerade (1913)
- The Brand Of California (1913)
- Bewitched Matches (1913)
- He Loves To Watch The Flight of Time (1913)
- The Two Suffragettes (1913)
- The Safety Pin (1913)
- The Red Balloons (1913)
- The Mosquito (1913)
- He Ruins His Family's Reputation (1913)
- He Slept Well (1913)
- He Was Not Ill, Only Unhappy (1913)
- Uncle Sam and his Suit (1913)
- The Polo Boat (1913)
- The Cubists (1913)
- The Artist (1913)
- It Is Hard to Please Him But It Is Worth It (1913)
- He Poses For His Portrait (1913)
- Wilson's Row Boat (1913)
- Clara and her Mysterious Toys (1913)
- The Hat (1913)
- Thaw and the Lasso (1913)
- Bryant and the Speeches (1913)
- A Vegetarian's Dream (1913)
- Thaw and the Spider (1913)
- He Loves to be Amused (1913)
- Unforeseen Metamorphosis (1913)
- He Likes Things Upside Down (1913)
- Pickup Is A Sportsman (1913)
- Zozor (1914)
- What They Eat (1914)
- The Terrible Scrap Of Paper (1914)
- The Greedy Neighbor (1914)
- The Bath (1914)
- The Anti-Neurasthenic Trumpet (1914)
- Ses Ancêtres (1914)
- Serbia's Card (1914)
- Le ouistiti de Toto (1914)
- L'enlèvement de Denajire Goldebois (1914)
- L'avenir dévoilé par les lignes de pieds (1914)
- He Does Not Care To Be Photographed (1914)
- Il aime le bruit (1914)
- Society at Simpson Center (1914)
- Les allumettes fantaisistes (1914)
- The Social Group (1914)
- Une drame sur la planche à chaussures (1915)
- Fantaisies truquées (1915)
- Éclair Journal (1915)
- Pulcherie et ses meubles (1916)
- Pages d' histoire number 1 and 2 (1916)
- Mariage par suggestion (1916)
- Les victuailles de Gretchen se révoltent (1916)
- Les tableaux futuristes et incohérents (1916)
- Les fiançailles de Flambeau (1916)
- Les exploits de Farfadet (1916)
- Les évasions de Bob Walter (1916)
- Les braves petits soldats de plomb (1916)
- Les aventures de Clémentine (1916) (co-regisseur)
- La main mystérieuse (1916)
- La journée de Flambeau (1916) (co-regisseur)
- La campagne de France 1814 (1916)
- La blanchisserie américaine (1916)
- Jeux de cartes (1916)
- Flambeau au pays des surprises (1916)
- Figures de cire et têtes de bois (1916)
- Éclair Journal: Série (1916)
- Croquemitaine et Rosalie (1916)
- Comment nous entendons (1916)
- Les aventures des Pieds-Nickelés (1918)
- La maison du Fantoche (1921)

== See also ==
- Paul Grimault, next significant French animator

== Sources ==
- Donald Crafton; Emile Cohl, Caricature, and Film; Princeton Press; ISBN 0-691-05581-5 (1990)
- Michael Barrier; Hollywood Cartoons: American Animation in Its Golden Age; Oxford University Press; ISBN 0-19-503759-6 (1999)
- Giannalberto Bendazzi (Anna Taraboletti-Segre, English translator); Cartoons: One Hundred Years of Cinema Animation; Indiana University Press; ISBN 0-253-20937-4 (2001 reprint)
- Pierre Courtet-Cohl, Bernard Génin; Emile Cohl – L'inventeur du dessin animé; Omniscience; ISBN 978-2-916097-16-9 (2008)
