= 78th Academy Awards =

- One of the two official posters designed by Studio 318
- Date: March 5, 2006
- Site: Kodak Theatre; Hollywood, Los Angeles, California, U.S.
- Hosted by: Jon Stewart
- Preshow hosts: Billy Bush, Chris Connelly, Cynthia Garrett, and Vanessa Minnillo
- Produced by: Gil Cates
- Directed by: Louis J. Horvitz

Highlights
- Best Picture: Crash
- Most awards: Brokeback Mountain, Crash, King Kong and Memoirs of a Geisha (3)
- Most nominations: Brokeback Mountain (8)

TV in the United States
- Network: ABC
- Duration: 3 hours, 33 minutes
- Ratings: 38.94 million 23.0% (Nielsen ratings)

The 78th Academy Awards, presented by the Academy of Motion Picture Arts and Sciences (AMPAS), took place on March 5, 2006, at the Kodak Theatre in Hollywood, Los Angeles beginning at 5:00 p.m. PST / 8:00 p.m. EST. The ceremony was scheduled one week later than usual to avoid a clash with the 2006 Winter Olympics. During the ceremony, AMPAS presented Academy Awards (commonly referred to as Oscars) in 24 categories honoring films released in 2005. The ceremony, televised in the United States by ABC, was produced by Gil Cates and directed by Louis J. Horvitz. Comedian Jon Stewart hosted the show for the first time. Two weeks earlier in a ceremony at The Beverly Hilton in Beverly Hills, California held on February 18, the Academy Awards for Technical Achievement were presented by host Rachel McAdams.

Crash won three awards, including Best Picture. Other winners included Brokeback Mountain, King Kong, and Memoirs of a Geisha with three awards and Capote, The Chronicles of Narnia: The Lion, the Witch and the Wardrobe, The Constant Gardener, Hustle & Flow, March of the Penguins, The Moon and the Son: An Imagined Conversation, A Note of Triumph: The Golden Age of Norman Corwin, Six Shooter, Syriana, Tsotsi, Walk the Line, and Wallace & Gromit: The Curse of the Were-Rabbit with one. The telecast garnered nearly 39 million viewers in the United States.

== Winners and nominees ==
The nominees for the 78th Academy Awards were announced on January 31, 2006, at the Samuel Goldwyn Theater in the academy's Beverly Hills headquarters by Sid Ganis, president of the academy, and actress Mira Sorvino. Brokeback Mountain earned the most nominations with eight total; Crash, Good Night, and Good Luck, and Memoirs of a Geisha tied for second with six nominations each. For the fourth time in Oscar history since the Best Picture nominees roster was limited to five films, all five nominees received corresponding Best Directing nominations. Additionally, for the second time all Best Picture nominees received corresponding directing and writing nominations (which previously happened only on the 37th Academy Awards in 1965).

The winners were announced during the awards ceremony on March 5, 2006. Crash was the first Best Picture winner since 1976's Rocky to win only three Oscars and the first Best Picture winner since 1981's Chariots of Fire to not win Best Directing or any for acting. Best Directing winner Ang Lee became the first non-white winner of that category. For the third time since introducing supporting acting categories, all four acting winners were first-time nominees. At age 20, Keira Knightley was the second-youngest Best Actress nominee for her performance as Elizabeth Bennet in Pride & Prejudice. Best Supporting Actor winner George Clooney was the fifth person to receive acting, directing, and screenwriting nominations in the same year and the first person to earn acting and directing nominations for two different films. By virtue of his nominations for both Memoirs of a Geisha and Munich, composer John Williams earned a total of 45 nominations tying him with Alfred Newman as the second most nominated individual in Oscar history. (Note: Walt Disney has the most Oscar nominations for any individual with 64.) "It's Hard out Here for a Pimp" became the second rap song to win Best Original Song and the first such song to be performed at an Oscars ceremony.

=== Awards ===
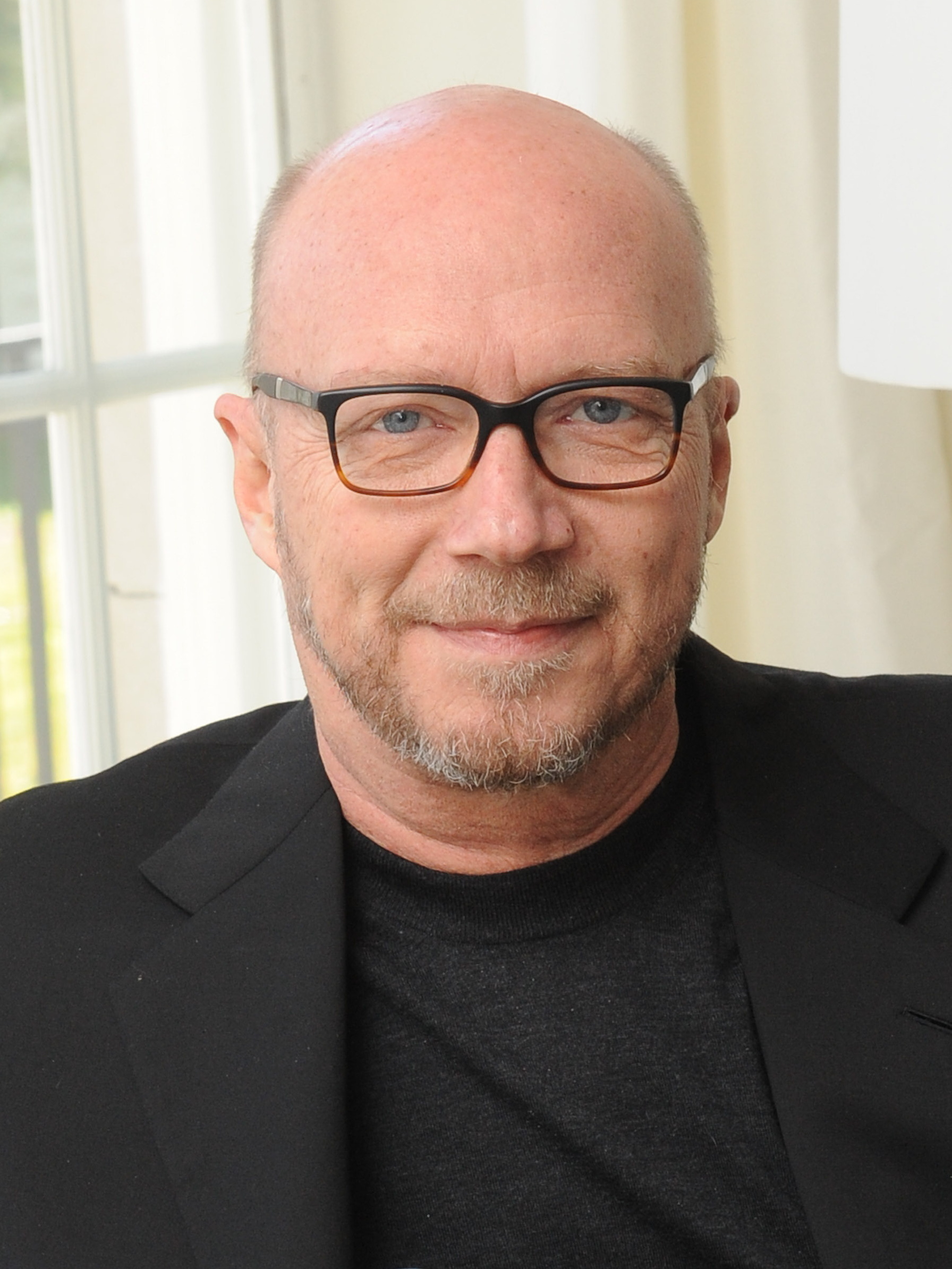
Paul Haggis, Best Picture and Best Original Screenplay co-winner

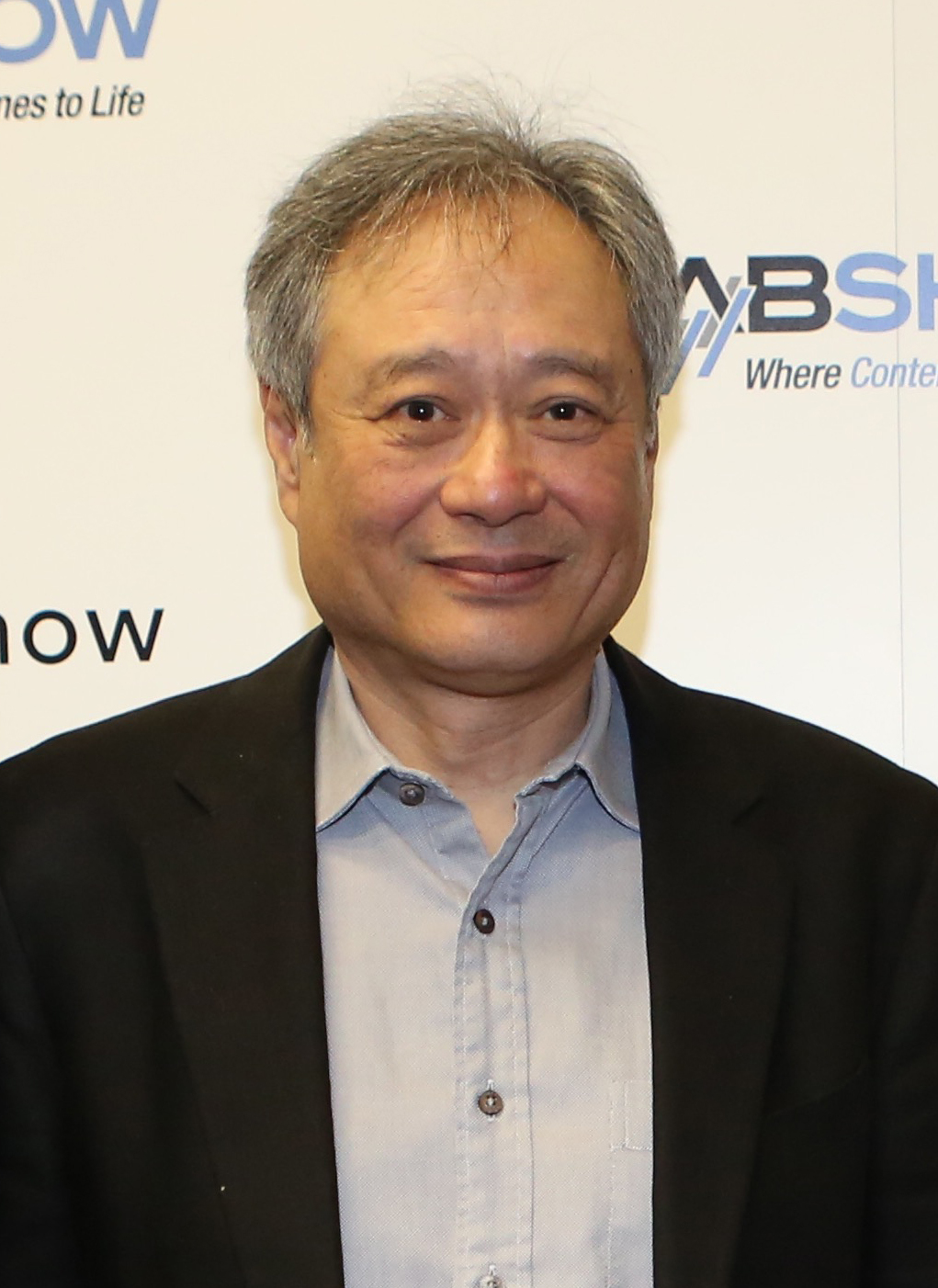
Ang Lee, Best Directing winner

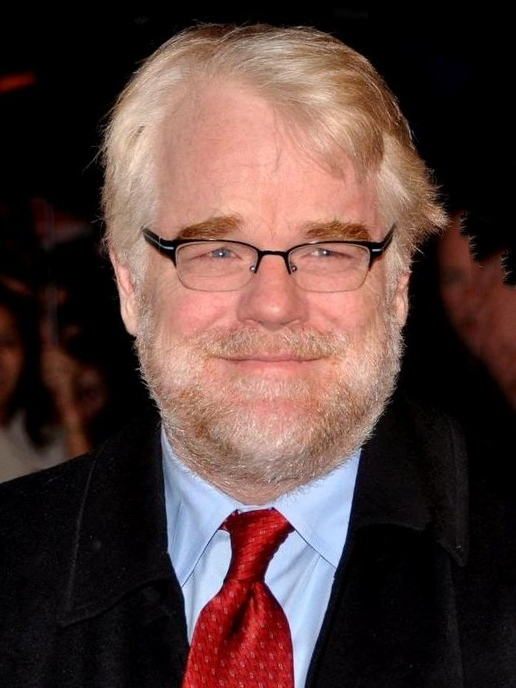
Philip Seymour Hoffman, Best Actor winner

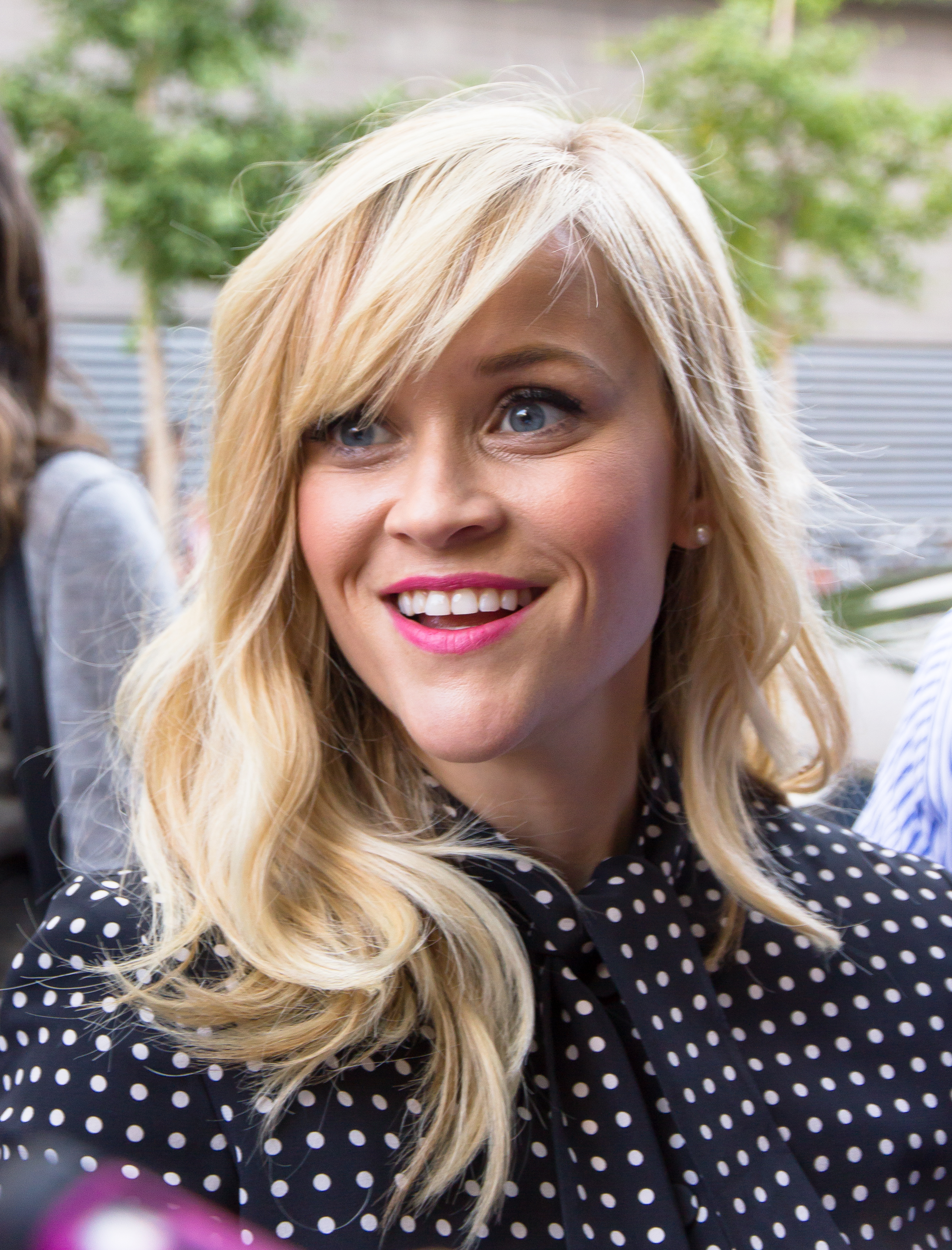
Reese Witherspoon, Best Actress winner

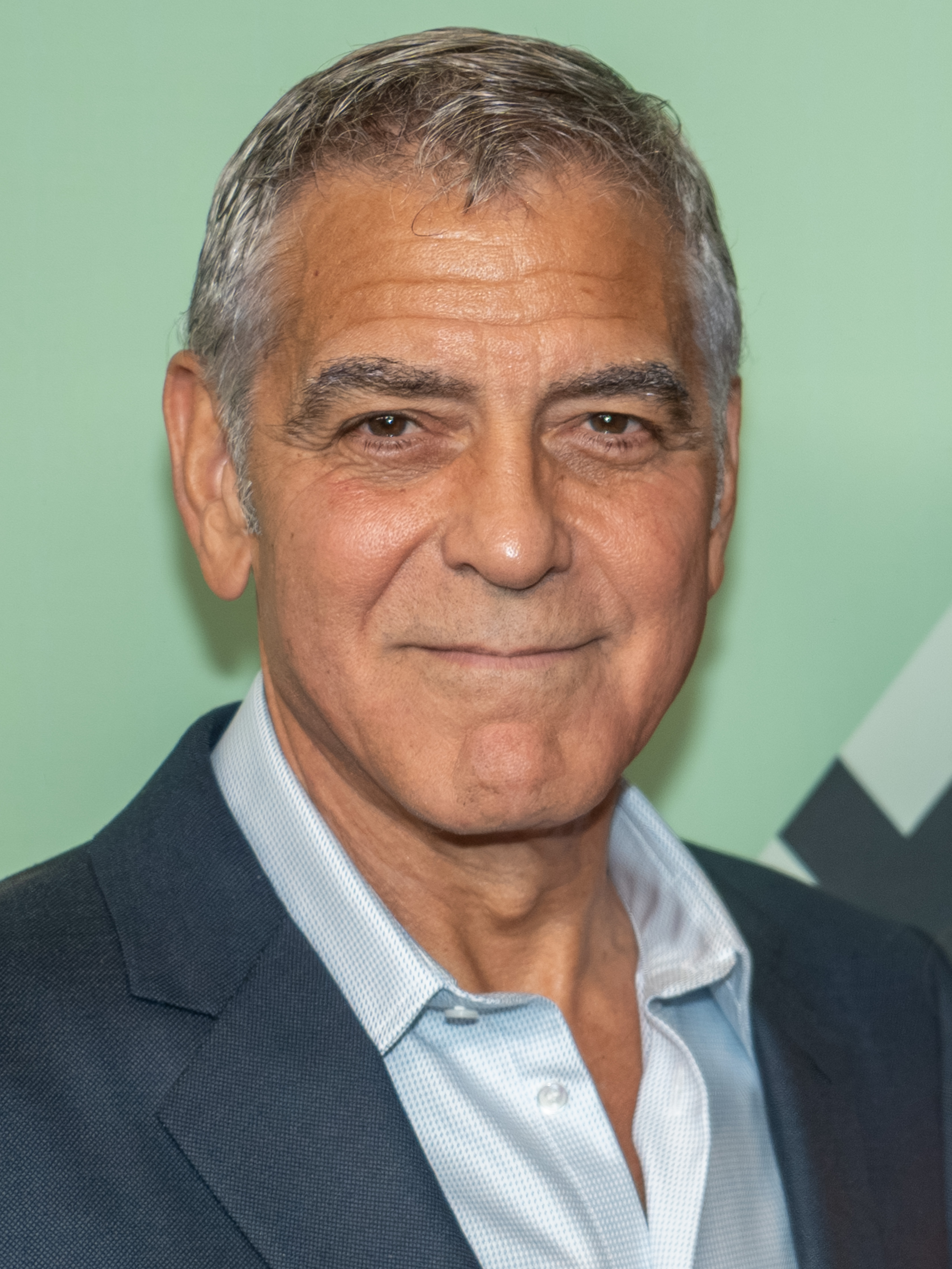
George Clooney, Best Supporting Actor winner

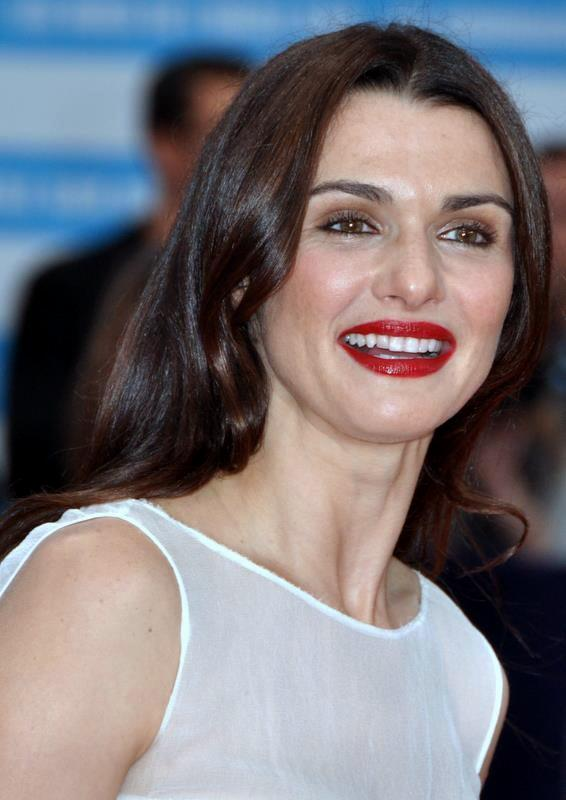
Rachel Weisz, Best Supporting Actress winner

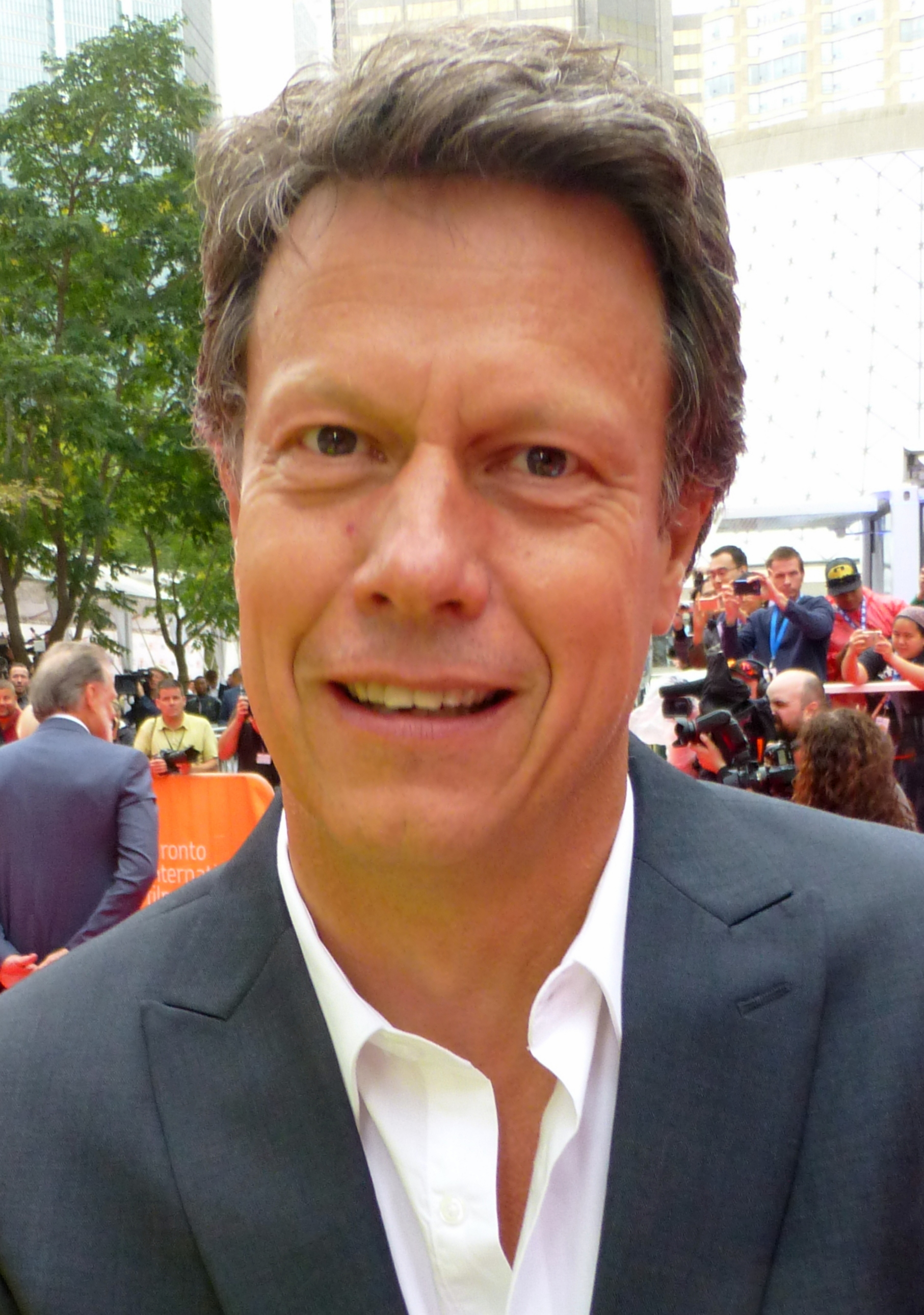
Gavin Hood, Best Foreign Language Film winner

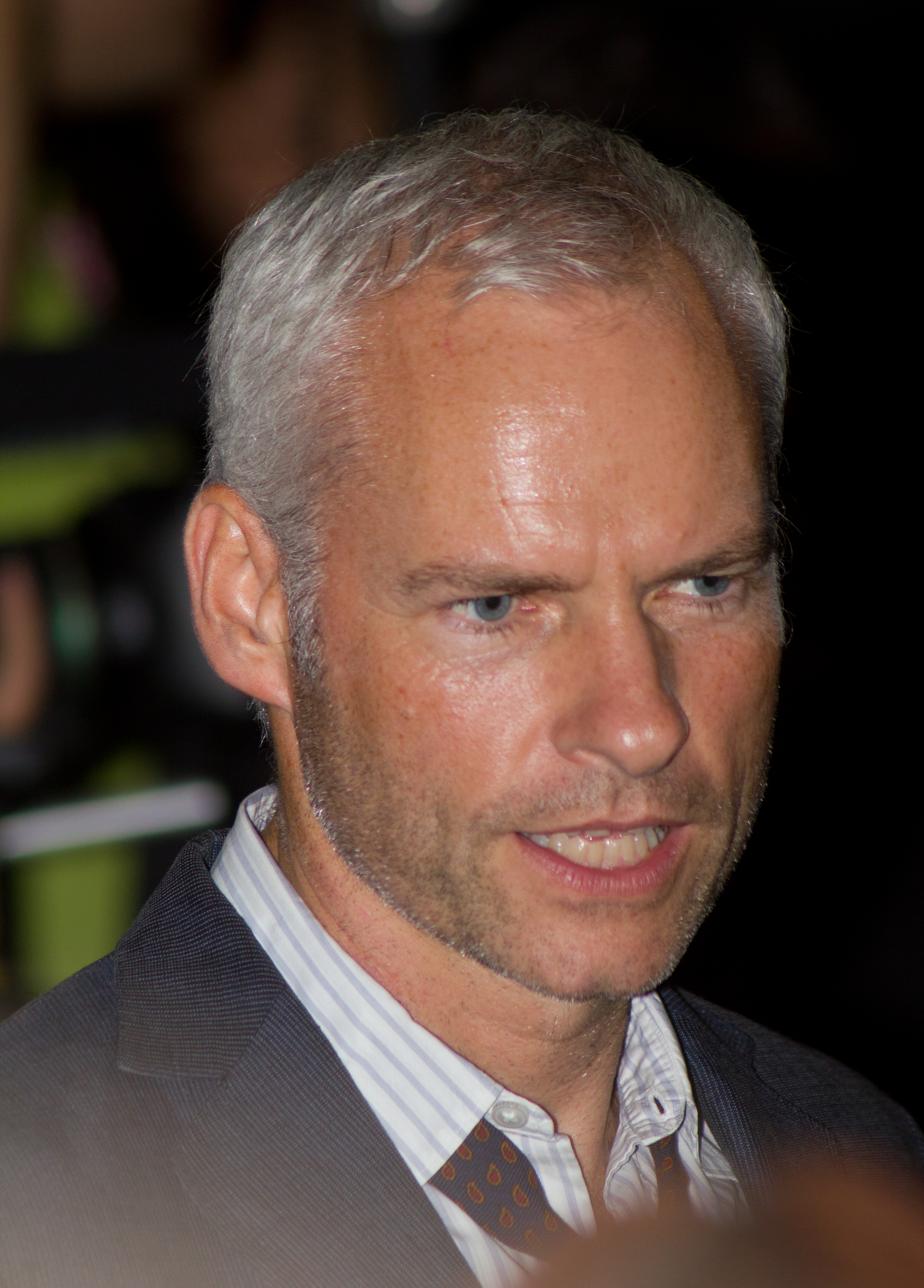
Martin McDonagh, Best Live Action Short Film winner

Winners are listed first and highlighted in boldface.

**Best Picture**: **Crash – Paul Haggis and Cathy Schulman, producers**; Brokeback Mountain – Diana Ossana and James Schamus, producers; Capote – Caroline Baron, William Vince and Michael Ohoven, producers; Good Night, and Good Luck – Grant Heslov, producer; Munich – Kathleen Kennedy, Steven Spielberg and Barry Mendel, producers	**Best Directing**: **Ang Lee – Brokeback Mountain**; Bennett Miller – Capote; Paul Haggis – Crash; George Clooney – Good Night, and Good Luck; Steven Spielberg – Munich
**Best Actor in a Leading Role**: **Philip Seymour Hoffman – Capote as Truman Capote**; Terrence Howard – Hustle & Flow as DJay; Heath Ledger – Brokeback Mountain as Ennis Del Mar; Joaquin Phoenix – Walk the Line as Johnny Cash; David Strathairn – Good Night, and Good Luck as Edward R. Murrow	**Best Actress in a Leading Role**: **Reese Witherspoon – Walk the Line as June Carter Cash**; Judi Dench – Mrs Henderson Presents as Laura Henderson; Felicity Huffman – Transamerica as Sabrina "Bree" Osbourne; Keira Knightley – Pride & Prejudice as Elizabeth Bennet; Charlize Theron – North Country as Josey Aimes
**Best Actor in a Supporting Role**: **George Clooney – Syriana as Bob Barnes**; Matt Dillon – Crash as Officer John Ryan; Paul Giamatti – Cinderella Man as Joe Gould; Jake Gyllenhaal – Brokeback Mountain as Jack Twist; William Hurt – A History of Violence as Richie Cusack	**Best Actress in a Supporting Role**: **Rachel Weisz – The Constant Gardener as Tessa Quayle**; Amy Adams – Junebug as Ashley Johnsten; Catherine Keener – Capote as Harper Lee; Frances McDormand – North Country as Glory Dodge; Michelle Williams – Brokeback Mountain as Alma Beers Del Mar
**Best Writing (Original Screenplay)**: **Crash – Screenplay by Paul Haggis and Bobby Moresco; Story by Paul Haggis**; Good Night, and Good Luck – George Clooney and Grant Heslov; Match Point – Woody Allen; The Squid and the Whale – Noah Baumbach; Syriana – Stephen Gaghan	**Best Writing (Adapted Screenplay)**: **Brokeback Mountain – Larry McMurtry and Diana Ossana based on the short story by Annie Proulx**; Capote – Dan Futterman based on the book by Gerald Clarke; The Constant Gardener – Jeffrey Caine based on the novel by John le Carré; A History of Violence – Josh Olson based on the graphic novel by John Wagner and Vince Locke; Munich – Tony Kushner and Eric Roth based on the book Vengeance: The True Story of an Israeli Counter-Terrorist Team by George Jonas
**Best Animated Feature Film**: **Wallace & Gromit: The Curse of the Were-Rabbit – Nick Park and Steve Box**; Howl's Moving Castle – Hayao Miyazaki; Tim Burton's Corpse Bride – Mike Johnson and Tim Burton	**Best Foreign Language Film**: **Tsotsi (South Africa) in Afrikaans – Gavin Hood**; Don't Tell (Italy) in Italian – Cristina Comencini; Joyeux Noël (France) in French – Christian Carion; Paradise Now (Palestine (Note: Best Foreign Language Film nominee Paradise Now was initially nominated as a submission from Palestine. However, following protests from pro-Israeli groups in the United States, the Academy decided to designate it as a submission from the Palestinian Authority, a move that was decried by the film's director Hany Abu-Assad. During the awards ceremony, the film was eventually announced by presenter Will Smith as a submission from the Palestinian territories.)) in Arabic – Hany Abu-Assad; Sophie Scholl – The Final Days (Germany) in German – Marc Rothemund
**Best Documentary (Feature)**: **March of the Penguins – Luc Jacquet and Yves Darondeau**; Darwin's Nightmare – Hubert Sauper; Enron: The Smartest Guys in the Room – Alex Gibney and Jason Kliot; Murderball – Henry-Alex Rubin and Dana Adam Shapiro; Street Fight – Marshall Curry	**Best Documentary (Short Subject)**: **A Note of Triumph: The Golden Age of Norman Corwin – Corinne Marrinan and Eric Simonson**; The Death of Kevin Carter: Casualty of the Bang Bang Club – Dan Krauss; God Sleeps in Rwanda – Kimberlee Acquaro and Stacy Sherman; The Mushroom Club – Steven Okazaki
**Best Short Film (Live Action)**: **Six Shooter – Martin McDonagh**; Cashback – Sean Ellis and Lene Bausager; The Last Farm – Rúnar Rúnarsson and Thor S. Sigurjónsson; Our Time Is Up – Rob Pearlstein and Pia Clemente; The Runaway (Ausreißer) – Ulrike Grote	**Best Short Film (Animated)**: **The Moon and the Son: An Imagined Conversation – John Canemaker and Peggy Stern**; 9 – Shane Acker; Badgered – Sharon Colman; The Mysterious Geographic Explorations of Jasper Morello – Anthony Lucas; One Man Band – Andrew Jimenez and Mark Andrews
**Best Music (Original Score)**: **Brokeback Mountain – Gustavo Santaolalla**; The Constant Gardener – Alberto Iglesias; Memoirs of a Geisha – John Williams; Munich – John Williams; Pride & Prejudice – Dario Marianelli	**Best Music (Original Song)**: **"It's Hard out Here for a Pimp" from Hustle & Flow – Music and Lyrics by Jordan Houston, Cedric Coleman and Paul Beauregard**; "In the Deep" from Crash – Music by Kathleen "Bird" York and Michael Becker; Lyrics by Kathleen "Bird" York; "Travelin' Thru" from Transamerica – Music and Lyrics by Dolly Parton
**Best Sound Editing**: **King Kong – Mike Hopkins and Ethan Van der Ryn**; Memoirs of a Geisha – Wylie Stateman; War of the Worlds – Richard King	**Best Sound Mixing**: **King Kong – Christopher Boyes, Michael Semanick, Michael Hedges and Hammond Peek**; The Chronicles of Narnia: The Lion, the Witch and the Wardrobe – Terry Porter, Dean A. Zupancic and Tony Johnson; Memoirs of a Geisha – Kevin O'Connell, Greg P. Russell, Rick Kline and John Pritchett; Walk the Line – Paul Massey, D.M. Hemphill and Peter Kurland; War of the Worlds – Andy Nelson, Anna Behlmer and Ron Judkins
**Best Art Direction**: **Memoirs of a Geisha – Art Direction: John Myhre; Set Decoration: Gretchen Rau**; Good Night, and Good Luck – Art Direction: Jim Bissell; Set Decoration: Jan Pascale; Harry Potter and the Goblet of Fire – Art Direction: Stuart Craig; Set Decoration: Stephenie McMillan; King Kong – Art Direction: Grant Major; Set Decoration: Dan Hennah and Simon Bright; Pride & Prejudice – Art Direction: Sarah Greenwood; Set Decoration: Katie Spencer	**Best Cinematography**: **Memoirs of a Geisha – Dion Beebe**; Batman Begins – Wally Pfister; Brokeback Mountain – Rodrigo Prieto; Good Night, and Good Luck – Robert Elswit; The New World – Emmanuel Lubezki
**Best Makeup**: **The Chronicles of Narnia: The Lion, the Witch and the Wardrobe – Howard Berger and Tami Lane**; Cinderella Man – David LeRoy Anderson and Lance Anderson; Star Wars: Episode III – Revenge of the Sith – Dave Elsey and Nikki Gooley	**Best Costume Design**: **Memoirs of a Geisha – Colleen Atwood**; Charlie and the Chocolate Factory – Gabriella Pescucci; Mrs Henderson Presents – Sandy Powell; Pride & Prejudice – Jacqueline Durran; Walk the Line – Arianne Phillips
**Best Film Editing**: **Crash – Hughes Winborne**; Cinderella Man – Mike Hill and Dan Hanley; The Constant Gardener – Claire Simpson; Munich – Michael Kahn; Walk the Line – Michael McCusker	**Best Visual Effects**: **King Kong – Joe Letteri, Brian Van't Hul, Christian Rivers and Richard Taylor**; The Chronicles of Narnia: The Lion, the Witch and the Wardrobe – Dean Wright, Bill Westenhofer, Jim Berney and Scott Farrar; War of the Worlds – Dennis Muren, Pablo Helman, Randal M. Dutra and Dan Sudick

=== Honorary Award ===
- To Robert Altman in recognition of a career that has repeatedly reinvented the art form and inspired filmmakers and audiences alike.

=== Films with multiple nominations and awards ===
Films that received multiple nominations
Nominations	Film
8	Brokeback Mountain
6	Crash
6	Good Night, and Good Luck
6	Memoirs of a Geisha
5	Capote
5	Munich
5	Walk the Line
4	The Constant Gardener
4	King Kong
4	Pride & Prejudice
3	Cinderella Man
3	The Chronicles of Narnia: The Lion, the Witch and the Wardrobe
3	War of the Worlds
2	A History of Violence
2	Hustle & Flow
2	Mrs Henderson Presents
2	North Country
2	Syriana
2	Transamerica

Films that received multiple awards
Wins	Film
3	Brokeback Mountain
3	Crash
3	King Kong
3	Memoirs of a Geisha

== Presenters and performers ==
The following individuals presented awards or performed musical numbers.

=== Presenters ===
Name(s)	Role
Tom Kane	Announcer for the 78th annual Academy Awards
Nicole Kidman	Presenter of the award for Best Supporting Actor
Ben Stiller	Presenter of the award for Best Visual Effects
Reese Witherspoon	Presenter of the award for Best Animated Feature Film
Naomi Watts	Introducer of the performance of Best Original Song nominee "Travelin' Thru"
Luke Wilson; Owen Wilson	Presenters of the award for Best Live Action Short Film
Chicken Little (Zach Braff); Abby Mallard (Joan Cusack)	Presenters of the award for Best Animated Short Film
Jennifer Aniston	Presenter of the award for Best Costume Design
Russell Crowe	Presenter of the biographical films montage
Steve Carell; Will Ferrell	Presenters of the award for Best Makeup
Rachel McAdams	Presenter of the segment of the Academy Awards for Technical Achievement and the Gordon E. Sawyer Award
Morgan Freeman	Presenter of the award for Best Supporting Actress
Lauren Bacall	Presenter of the film noir montage
Terrence Howard	Presenter of the award for Best Documentary Short Subject
Charlize Theron	Presenter of the award for Best Documentary Feature
Jennifer Lopez	Introducer of the performance of Best Original Song nominee "In the Deep"
Sandra Bullock; Keanu Reeves	Presenters of the award for Best Art Direction
Samuel L. Jackson	Presenter of the political films montage
Sid Ganis (AMPAS president)	Presenter of a special presentation regarding activities funded by the Academy of Motion Picture Arts and Sciences
Salma Hayek	Introducer of the special instrumental solo performance to the tune of Best Original Score nominees and presenter of the award for Best Original Score
Jake Gyllenhaal	Presenter of the epic films montage
Jessica Alba; Eric Bana	Presenters of the award for Best Sound Mixing
Meryl Streep; Lily Tomlin	Presenters of the Academy Honorary Award to Robert Altman
Ludacris	Introducer of the performance of Best Original Song nominee "It's Hard out Here for a Pimp"
Queen Latifah	Presenter of the award for Best Original Song
Jennifer Garner	Presenter of the award for Best Sound Editing
George Clooney	Presenter of the "In Memoriam" tribute
Will Smith	Presenter of the award for Best Foreign Language Film
Ziyi Zhang	Presenter of the award for Best Film Editing
Hilary Swank	Presenter of the award for Best Actor
John Travolta	Presenter of the award for Best Cinematography
Jamie Foxx	Presenter of the award for Best Actress
Dustin Hoffman	Presenter of the award for Best Adapted Screenplay
Uma Thurman	Presenter of the award for Best Original Screenplay
Tom Hanks	Presenter of the award for Best Director
Jack Nicholson	Presenter of the award for Best Picture

=== Performers ===
Name(s)	Role	Performed
Bill Conti	Musical arranger and Conductor	Orchestral
Dolly Parton	Performer	"Travelin' Thru" from Transamerica
Kathleen York	Performer	"In the Deep" from Crash
Itzhak Perlman	Performer	Performed musical selections for Best Original Score nominees
Three 6 Mafia; Taraji P. Henson	Performers	"It's Hard out Here for a Pimp" from Hustle & Flow

== Ceremony information ==
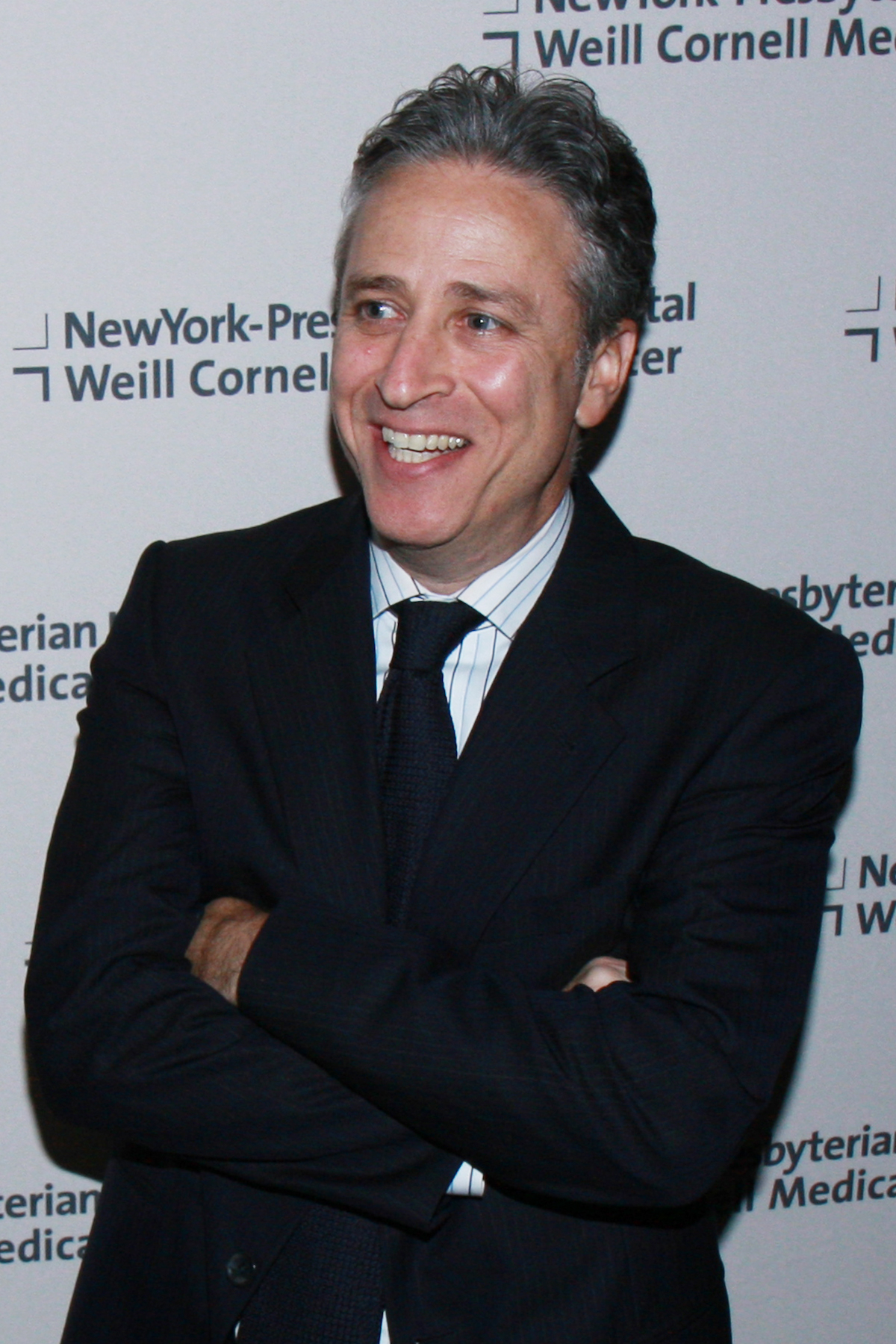
Jon Stewart hosted the 78th Academy Awards.

Despite the negative reception from the preceding year's ceremony, the academy rehired Gilbert Cates to oversee production of the awards gala. However, in an article published in The New York Times, it was stated that 2005 host Chris Rock would not return to host the show. According to a statement released by his publicist, "He didn't want to do it in perpetuity, He'd like to do it again down the road." Furthermore, many media outlets speculated that several AMPAS members felt uncomfortable with Rock's disparaging comments about Colin Farrell, Jude Law, and Tobey Maguire. Initially, Cates sought actor and veteran Oscar host Billy Crystal to host the ceremony again. However, Crystal declined the offer citing his commitment to his one-man comedy show 700 Sundays.

In January 2006, Cates announced that actor, comedian, and talk show host Jon Stewart, who had previously hosted two consecutive Grammy Awards ceremonies in 2001 and 2002, was chosen as host of the 2006 telecast. Cates explained the decision to hire him saying, "My wife and I watch him every night. Jon is the epitome of a perfect host — smart, engaging, irreverent and funny." In a statement, Stewart expressed that he was honored to be selected to emcee the program, jokingly adding, "Although, as an avid watcher of the Oscars, I can't help but be a little disappointed with the choice. It appears to be another sad attempt to smoke out Billy Crystal."

Several other people and companies participated in the production of the ceremony. Bill Conti served as musical supervisor for the telecast. Media firm The Ant Farm produced a thirty-second trailer promoting the broadcast featuring clips highlighting past Oscar winners to the tune of the song "Our Lives" by The Calling. Previous Oscar hosts such as Whoopi Goldberg and Steve Martin, and actors Mel Gibson, George Clooney, Halle Berry appeared in an opening comedic sketch. Actor Tom Hanks participated in a pre-taped comedic sketch lampooning Oscar speeches. Stephen Colbert (host of The Colbert Report, the sister program of Stewart's The Daily Show) narrated two different mock attack ads lampooning both the intense campaigning and lobbying during Oscar season put forth by film studios and political advertising during elections. Violinist Itzhak Perlman performed excerpts from the five nominees for Best Original Score.

=== Box office performance of nominated films ===
When the nominations were announced on January 31, the field of major nominees favored independent, low-budget films over blockbusters. The combined gross of the five Best Picture nominees when the Oscars were announced was $186 million with an average gross of $37.3 million per film. Crash was the highest earner among the Best Picture nominees with $53.4 million in domestic box office receipts. The film was followed by Brokeback Mountain ($51.7 million), Munich ($40.8 million), Good Night and Good Luck ($25.2 million), and finally Capote ($15.4 million).

Of the top 50 grossing movies of the year, 35 nominations went to 13 films on the list. Only Walk the Line (19th), Cinderella Man (41st), Wallace and Gromit: The Curse of the Were-Rabbit (45th), and Crash (48th) were nominated for Best Picture, Best Animated Feature, or any of the directing, acting, or screenwriting. The other top 50 box office hits that earned nominations were Star Wars Episode III: Revenge of the Sith (1st), Harry Potter and the Goblet of Fire (2nd), The Chronicles of Narnia: The Lion, The Witch, and The Wardrobe (3rd), War of the Worlds (4th), King Kong (5th), Charlie and the Chocolate Factory (7th), Batman Begins (8th), March of the Penguins, (26th), and Memoirs of a Geisha (47th).

=== Critical reviews ===
Some media outlets received the broadcast positively. St. Louis Post-Dispatch television critic Gail Pennington praised Stewart's performance as host writing that he "did the Oscars proud Sunday night, turning in a four-star hosting performance that unfortunately made the rest of the show seem sluggish by comparison." Film critic Roger Ebert said that Stewart was "on target, topical and funny," and added, "He was as relaxed, amusing and at home as Johnny Carson." Columnist Ray Richmond of The Hollywood Reporter commented, "He seemed at times nervous and self-conscious, but on the whole, Stewart delivered with just the right balance of reverence and smugness."

Others media publications were more critical of the show. Television critic Rob Owen of the Pittsburgh Post-Gazette wrote that Stewart was more "amusing than funny". He added, "Many of his jokes fell flat with the stars in the Kodak Theatre, and his tendency to bow down before celebrities quickly grew tiresome." Tom Shales from The Washington Post commented, "It's hard to believe that professional entertainers could have put together a show less entertaining than this year's Oscars, hosted with a smug humorlessness by comic Jon Stewart, a sad and pale shadow of great hosts gone by." Moreover, he derided the "piles and piles and miles and miles of clips from films present and past" writing that it "squandered the visual luster" of the ceremony. Associated Press television critic Frazier Moore remarked, "Stewart, usually a very funny guy, displayed a lack of beginner's luck as first-time host...His usually impeccable blend of puckishness and self-effacement fell flat in the service of Oscar." He also criticized the decision to play music over the winner's acceptance speeches calling it "distracting and obnoxious."

In retrospective commentary, Crash's win for Best Picture over Brokeback Mountain has become "one of the most notorious [decisions] in modern Academy history" and a source of "earnest bafflement from critics". Rankings by several publications and critics have called Crash one of the worst or most controversial Best Picture winners.

=== Ratings and reception ===
The American telecast on ABC drew in an average of 38.94 million people over its length, which was an 8% decrease from the previous year's ceremony. Additionally, the show earned lower Nielsen ratings compared to the previous ceremony with 23.0% of households watching over a 35 share. Furthermore, it garnered a lower 18–49 demo rating with a 13.9 rating among viewers in that demographic. It was the week's most-watched program and the season's most-watched entertainment program.

In July 2006, the ceremony presentation received nine nominations at the 58th Primetime Emmys. The following month, the ceremony won four of those nominations for Outstanding Art Direction for a Variety, Music Program, or Special (Roy Christopher and Jeff Richman), Outstanding Directing for a Variety, Music, or Comedy Program (Louis J. Horvitz), Outstanding Main Title Design (Renato Grgic, Alen Petkovic, Kristijan Petrovic, and Jon Teschner), and Outstanding Sound Mixing for a Variety, Music, or Animation Series or Special (Patrick Baltzell, Robert Douglass, Edward J. Greene, Jamie Santos, and Tom Vicari).

== "In Memoriam" ==
The annual "In Memoriam": tribute was presented by actor George Clooney. The montage featured an excerpt of the theme from Now, Voyager composed by Max Steiner.

- Teresa Wright – Actress
- Noriyuki "Pat" Morita – Actor, comedian
- Robert F. Newmyer – Producer
- Dan O'Herlihy – Actor
- Vincent Schiavelli – Character actor
- Joe Ranft – Writer, voice actor
- Moira Shearer – Ballet dancer, actress
- Fayard Nicholas – Choreographer, dancer
- Joel Hirschhorn – Composer
- Sandra Dee – Actress
- John Fiedler – Actor, voice actor
- Anthony Franciosa – Actor
- Stu Linder – Editor
- Barbara Bel Geddes – Actress
- Moustapha Akkad – Producer
- Chris Penn – Actor
- John Mills – Actor
- Robert "Buzz" Knudson – Re-recording mixer
- Simone Simon – Actress
- Debra Hill – Producer
- Onna White – Choreographer
- Robert J. Schiffer – Makeup artist
- Guy Green – Cinematographer, director
- Brock Peters – Actor
- Ernest Lehman – Writer
- Shelley Winters – Actress
- Anne Bancroft – Actress
- John Box – Production designer
- Eddie Albert – Actor
- Ismail Merchant – Producer
- Robert Wise – Director
- Richard Pryor – Stand-up comedian, actor

== See also ==
- 12th Screen Actors Guild Awards
- 26th Golden Raspberry Awards
- 48th Grammy Awards
- 58th Primetime Emmy Awards
- 59th British Academy Film Awards
- 60th Tony Awards
- 63rd Golden Globe Awards
- List of submissions to the 78th Academy Awards for Best Foreign Language Film

== Bibliography ==
- Osborne, Robert (2008). 80 Years of the Oscar: The Complete History of the Academy Awards. New York: Abbeville Publishing Group. ISBN 978-0-7892-0992-4.
- Terrance, Vincent (2013). Television Specials: 5,336 Entertainment Programs, 1936–2012 (5 ed.). Jefferson, North Carolina: Ballantine Books, McFarland & Company. ISBN 978-1-4766-1240-9. OCLC 844373010.
