= Animated documentary =

Genre of film that combines animation and documentary

The animated documentary (also known as anidoc) is a moving image form that combines animation and documentary. This form should not be confused with documentaries about movie and TV animation history that feature excerpts.

== History ==
Winsor McCay's 1918 film The Sinking of the Lusitania was the first animated documentary.

The first recognized example of this genre is Winsor McCay's 1918 12-minute-long film The Sinking of the Lusitania, which uses animation to portray the 1915 sinking of RMS Lusitania after it was struck by two torpedoes launched by a German U-boat; an event of which no recorded film footage is known to exist. Since the 1920s, animation has been used in educational and social guidance films, and has often been used to illustrate abstract concepts in mainly live-action examples of these genres. Early examples of fully animated educational films are The Einstein Theory of Relativity and Evolution (both 1923) by Max and Dave Fleischer. Walt Disney used it in films such as Victory Through Air Power (1943), How to Catch a Cold (1951) and Our Friend the Atom (1957).

In 1953, Norman McLaren's film Neighbours won the Academy Awards for Best Documentary (Short Subject), despite the film not being a documentary. The film is an example of pixilation, a Stop motion technique which uses human actors. The Academy has never issued a formal explanation of why McLaren's film was considered a documentary, though some speculate it is due to the film's strong anti-war themes.

Of Stars and Men, a 1964 animated feature by John Hubley which tells of humankind's quest to find its place in the universe, won an award in the documentary category at the San Francisco Film Festival.

Mosaic Films promoted the use of animated documentaries in the United Kingdom in 2003 with the award-winning series Animated Minds. Commissioned by Channel 4 and directed by Andy Glynne, it uses real testimony from survivors of mental illness, combined with engaging visuals, to climb inside the minds of the mentally distressed. The first series won the award for Best Animation at the Banff World Media Festival (2004).

The 2007 International Documentary Film Festival Amsterdam featured a programme of "documentaries that partly or completely consist of animation". In the article written to accompany the event, Kees Driessen talked about the "least controversial" form of the genre; the "illustrated radio documentary", citing Aardman Animation's 1987 film Lip Synch: Going Equipped (directed by Peter Lord) as an example. One of the most consistent creators of this form of animated documentary today is Paul Fierlinger. His films from the late 1980s-onward typically feature recordings of people talking about certain topics in their lives (such as alcohol abuse or loneliness), accompanied by Fierlinger's animation which mainly illustrates the stories in a realistic way. This is a contrast from films and series such as Aardman's Creature Comforts, which recontextualise such audio recordings by combining them with more fanciful, non-realistic animated interpretations.

Fierlinger's 1995 animated feature-length autobiography Drawn from Memory, in which he is the main subject as well as the director, voice actor and only animator, was also called a documentary by Driessen. This technique of animating interviews has also been used by other filmmakers, such as Chris Landreth in his Oscar-winning 2004 short film Ryan (mainly based on an interview done with animator Ryan Larkin) and Jonas Odell in the 2006 Swedish film Aldrig som första gången! (Never Like the First Time!, consisting of animated segments of people's descriptions of their first time engaging in sex). The film Chicago 10, about the Chicago Seven incident, received some acclaim for recreating courtroom scenes using animation. Another documentary with animated elements is the German film Neukölln Unlimited, which uses animation to depict past traumas of its protagonists.

The Oscar-nominated 2008 Israeli film Waltz with Bashir was advertised as being the first feature-length animated documentary.

Some animated documentaries that were nominated or won for Oscars are So Much for So Little (1949), Sunrise Over Tiananmen Square (1998), The Moon and the Son: An Imagined Conversation (2005), I Met the Walrus (2007), Last Day of Freedom (2015) and Flee (2021).
