= Ant farm (disambiguation) =

Ant farm may refer to:

== Science ==
- A formicarium, designed primarily for the study of ant colonies
- Agriculture by fungus-growing ants

== Arts and media ==
- Ant Farm (group), a group of artists that reached prominence in the 1970s
- A.N.T. Farm, a Disney Channel television series (2011–2014) starring China Anne McClain
- The Ant Farm, an advertising agency in Los Angeles
- Ant Farm (album), a 1994 album by 8 Bold Souls

== See also ==
- Alien Ant Farm, an American rock band
