= Sinking of the Lusitania =

Sinking of the Lusitania may refer to

- The 1915 sinking of the RMS Lusitania ocean liner by German U-boats
- The Sinking of the Lusitania, a 1918 animated film about the 1915 incident
