= Michael Cornacchia =

American actor

- Born: February 23, 1975 (age 51); Philadelphia, Pennsylvania, U.S.
- Occupations: Actor, comedian
- Years active: 1998–present

Michael Cornacchia (born February 23, 1975) is an American actor.

== Biography ==
=== Education ===
Cornacchia graduated from Conestoga High School in Berwyn, Pennsylvania, and the University of Southern California with a degree in theatre.

=== Career ===
Cornacchia has appeared on television shows including ER, The Practice, Six Feet Under, and CSI: NY. He did a pilot for CBS called Blind Men and one for NBC called Spellbound. He also appeared in the Internet series, Terry Tate: Office Linebacker, which was written and directed by Rawson Marshall Thurber. Cornacchia was also in the Academy Award-nominated short Our Time Is Up, written and directed by Rob Pearlstein. He appeared as Bobby in David Fickas' Deliverance: the Musical, which was an official selection of the Slamdance Film Festival. He has also voiced the role of Eddie in the video game version of Reservoir Dogs. Cornacchia also portrayed Jabba the Hutt and Admiral Ackbar in The Star Wars Trilogy in Thirty Minutes.

His voice work includes Bouncing Boy in the 2006 animated series Legion of Super Heroes, Candy in Driver Parallel Lines, Frankie the skua in Happy Feet and its sequel, along with various voices in Batman: Arkham Knight. Cornacchia appeared as Burly Bruce Carter in ABC's Pushing Daisies and Carter Bump a/k/a, The Cupcake Kid, in ABC's October Road. Cornacchia also had a minor role as a security guard in Hannah Montana: The Movie. He also guest stars in the episode, "Jake...Another Little Piece of My Heart" as a Las Vegas preacher in the 3rd season of Hannah Montana, the TV series.

In the fall of 2009, Cornacchia produced and starred in Grey Skies, a horror film about a group of college friends who reunite to vacation in a remote location only to find that they are not alone. Also in 2009, Cornacchia starred alongside Rhys Darby, Sasha Alexander, and Pam Cook in Edoardo Ponti's comedy Coming & Going, and produced the short film What the F&#$ Was That?!, a parody of ghost hunting series. In 2012, Cornacchia was cast in the AudioDrop production of Moonie based on Nicola Cuti's classic comic book character.

== Personal life ==
Cornacchia is gay. He has voiced support for Israel in the Israeli–Palestinian conflict.

== Filmography ==
=== Film ===
| Year | Title | Role | Notes |
|---|---|---|---|
| 2008 | Our Time Is Up | Fondler | |
| 2006 | Shark Bait | Angler Fish (voice) | English dub |
| 2006 | Happy Feet | Frankie (voice) | |
| 2007 | Wasting Away | Ronald Rupert Eschelon III | |
| 2007 | La Cucina | Andy | |
| 2008 | The Last Word | Client | |
| 2009 | Hannah Montana: The Movie | Security Guard | |
| 2009 | Table for Three | Hector | Direct-to-video |
| 2010 | Violet Tendencies | Donnie the Waiter | |

=== Television ===
| Year | Title | Role | Notes |
|---|---|---|---|
| 1998 | ER | Tad | Episode: "They Treat Horses, Don't They?" |
| 1999 | Hang Time | Ronald Groober | Episode: "The Upset" |
| 2000 | The Practice | Johnny Franco | Episode: "Settling" |
| 2001 | The Tick | Kid Caboose | Episode: "Couples" |
| 2004 | Six Feet Under | Lawrence Tuttle | Episode: "Grinding the Corn" |
| 2004 | Second Time Around | Clayton | Episode: "No, No" |
| 2005 | CSI: NY | Rosie | Episode: "Blood, Sweat and Tears" |
| 2005 | The Bernie Mac Show | Norman | Episode: "Sorely Missed" |
| 2006–2008 | Legion of Super Heroes | Bouncing Boy (voice) | 15 episodes |
| 2007 | Just Jordan | Gideon | Episode: "Lemme See Your Grill" |
| 2007 | Entourage | Make-Up Artist | Episode: "Welcome to the Jungle" |
| 2007 | I Hate My 30's | Mikey | Episode: "Promotion Commotion, What's Your Notion?" |
| 2007 | Out of Jimmy's Head | Junior | Episode: "Bully" |
| 2007 | Pushing Daisies | Burly Bruce Carter | Episode: "Bitter Sweets" |
| 2008 | October Road | Carter Bump | Episode: "Revenge of the Cupcake Kid" |
| 2009 | Hannah Montana | Cupid Preacher | Episode: "Jake... Another Little Piece of My Heart" |
| 2009 | Greek | Businessman | Episode: "Down on Your Luck" |
| 2011 | The Cape | Pokerface Goon | Episode: "Razer" |
| 2014 | 2 Broke Girls | Straight Jim | Episode: "And the Model Apartment"; Uncredited |
| 2015 | Scorpion | Frank | Episode: "Crossroads" |
| 2016 | Real Husbands of Hollywood | Charles Ellis | Episode: "Nick and Kevin Are Wack" |
| 2017 | Powerless | Hot Dog Tony | Episode: "I'ma Friend You" |
| 2018 | Great News | Steve | Episode: "Early Retirement" |
| 2018 | Badge of a Quitter | Troop Leader Tony | Main role |
| 2018 | The Kids Are Alright | Boxcar Benji | Recurring role |
| 2019 | Coop & Cami Ask the World | Bobby Bonafonte | Episode: "Would You Wrather Be the Heart or the Hammer?" |

=== Video games ===
| Year | Title | Role | Notes |
|---|---|---|---|
| 2006 | Driver: Parallel Lines | Candy | |
| 2006 | Reservoir Dogs | Nice Guy Eddie | |
| 2007 | Dead Head Fred | Omar Escobar, additional voices | |
| 2011 | L.A. Noire | Gianni Temperino | |
| 2013 | Batman: Arkham Origins | Thugs | |
