= Pia Clemente =

American film producer

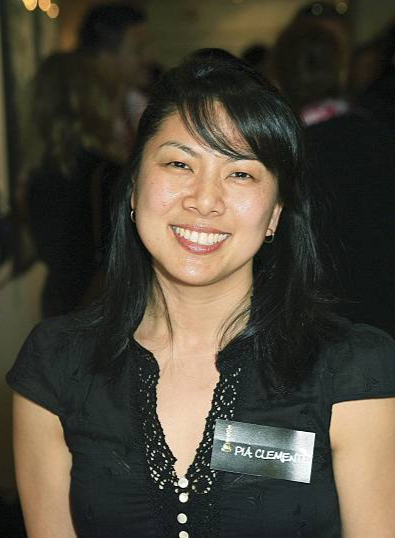
Pia Clemente at the 78th Academy Awards in The Academy of Motion Picture Arts and Sciences Grand Lobby, Beverly Hills, California (February 2006).

Pia Clemente is a Philippines-born American film producer best known for being the first Filipina-American nominated for an Oscar for Our Time is Up in the live action short film category in 2005 and as the producer of The Debut which was the first major Filipino American film to be shown in national theaters.

== Early life and education ==
Clemente was born in the Philippines and removed to New Jersey at the age of three. is a 1989 graduate of the Peddie School in Hightstown, New Jersey. Clemente first attended Lehigh University in 1989 and later transferred to Barnard College in 1990 where she was on both tennis teams. She was an Academic All-Ivy tennis player and had dreams of playing professionally before she suffered an injury and turned her interest toward theater and film. While at Barnard, Clemente produced a short film called Christmas in New York, which later won the Academy Award for Dramatic Short Student Film in 1997. In 1993, Clemente graduated from Barnard College with a degree in English. Afterwards, she earned a Master of Fine Arts from the American Film Institute Conservatory.

== Works ==
- Christmas in New York
- The Debut (2001)
- Our Time is Up (2005)
