= Transamerica (film) =

2005 independent comedy-drama film directed by Duncan Tucker

- Theatrical release poster
- Directed by: Duncan Tucker
- Written by: Duncan Tucker
- Produced by: Rene Bastian; Sebastian Dungan; Linda Morgan
- Starring: Felicity Huffman; Kevin Zegers; Graham Greene; Fionnula Flanagan; Burt Young; Carrie Preston; Elizabeth Peña
- Cinematography: Stephen Kazmierski
- Edited by: Pam Wise
- Music by: David Mansfield
- Production company: Belladonna Productions
- Distributed by: The Weinstein Company; IFC Films (North America); Contentfilm International (Overseas)
- Release dates: February 14, 2005 (Berlinale); December 2, 2005 (United States)
- Running time: 103 minutes
- Country: United States
- Language: English
- Budget: $1 million
- Box office: $15.2 million

Transamerica is a 2005 American road comedy-drama film written and directed by Duncan Tucker, and starring Felicity Huffman and Kevin Zegers. Released by IFC Films and The Weinstein Company, the film premiered at the Berlin International Film Festival on February 14, 2005, and to theaters in the United States on December 2, 2005.

The screenplay, inspired in part by conversations between Tucker and his then-roommate Katherine Connella, tells the story of Bree (Huffman), a trans woman, who goes on a road trip with her long-lost son Toby (Zegers).

The film received positive reviews and won multiple awards, including Huffman winning a Golden Globe and a nomination for an Academy Award.

== Plot ==
One week before her vaginoplasty, a trans woman named Sabrina "Bree" Osbourne receives an unexpected phone call from a young man named Toby Wilkins, a 17-year-old jailed in New York City. He asks to speak to "Stanley Schupak" (Bree's deadname); Toby claims to be the son of "Stanley". Bree was previously unaware she had a son and, wanting a clean break from her past, nearly renounces him. However, Bree's therapist, Dr. Margaret refuses to give her approval for Bree's upcoming surgery if Bree does not contact Toby.

Bree flies from Los Angeles to New York City to bail Toby out of jail. Toby is a foul-mouthed runaway who is a small-time drug user and male "hustler." Toby’s mother died by suicide when Toby was a child after which Toby was raised by his stepfather, whom Toby says he does not want to see. Bree pretends to be a Christian missionary and persuades Toby to ride with her back to the West Coast, secretly planning to leave him at his stepfather's house along the way. When they arrive in the town of Callicoon, Kentucky, it turns out that Toby's stepfather was abusive and he molested Toby several times when Toby was a child. Bree and Toby continue driving to Los Angeles together. They also stop by a house in Dallas where a group of transgender women are hosting a gender pride gathering. Later on in the trip when Bree urinates at the roadside, Toby accidentally discovers that Bree has male genitalia. Toby tries to be open-minded but is angry that Bree has not previously informed him that she is transgender.

After their car and money are stolen by a young hitchhiking hippie who calls himself a "peyote shaman", Toby makes some money by prostituting himself to a truck driver, telling Bree he got the money from selling drugs. A kindly rancher, Calvin Many Goats, drives Toby and Bree to Bree's parents' house in Phoenix, Arizona. During the drive, Calvin and Bree begin flirting, which disturbs Toby. At Bree's parents' house, Toby and Bree encounter Bree's self-centered mother, Elizabeth; Bree's Jewish father, Murray (who seems to be dominated by Elizabeth); and Bree's rebellious and sarcastic sister, Sydney. Elizabeth disapproves of Bree's transgender identity (it is mentioned that Bree has been estranged from her family for some time), but is astonished to find out she has a grandson. She is kind to Toby and invites him to stay and live with them. Toby enjoys luxury and kindness but hesitates because he does not like his grandparents' disrespectful attitude towards Bree.

Misunderstanding his feelings for Bree, Toby tries to seduce her, saying that he will marry her if she wants. Bree realizes she must tell Toby the truth immediately and reveals she is his biological father. Toby is appalled and infuriated that Bree had not disclosed this earlier. Later that night, Toby steals money and valuable antiques from the house and disappears. Heartbroken, Bree returns to Los Angeles via a plane ticket bought by her parents. Her family finally accepts her calling herself Bree and she has a successful surgery but is unhappy because she feels she will never again see or hear from Toby. While Bree is recovering from surgery, Margaret visits her; after she confesses she made a mistake, Bree sobs on her shoulder.

Months later, Bree is surprised to see Toby at her front door. Bree invites him inside and he tells her that in the meantime he has turned 18, he has bleached his hair blonde, and he has become an adult actor in gay pornographic films in Los Angeles. Bree is also vibrant, happy, and enjoying her job as a waitress at the restaurant where she was formerly a busser. They reconcile, seemingly happy to have each other.

== Cast ==
- Felicity Huffman as Sabrina "Bree" Osbourne / "Stanley Schupak"
- Kevin Zegers as Toby Wilkins, Bree's son
- Graham Greene as Calvin
- Fionnula Flanagan as Elizabeth Schupak, Bree's mother
- Burt Young as Murray Schupak, Bree's father
- Carrie Preston as Sydney Schupak, Bree's younger sister
- Elizabeth Peña as Dr. Margaret, Bree's psychiatrist
- Venida Evans as Arletty
- Teala Dunn as "little girl"
- Calpernia Addams as Calpernia
- Stella Maeve as Taylor
- Raynor Scheine as Bobby Jensen, Toby's step-father
- Danny Burstein as Dr. Spikowsky
- Bianca Leigh as Mary Ellen
- Andrea James as the voice coach

== Production ==
Alexandra Billings was initially offered the lead role of Bree.

In reference to her nude scene in the bathtub, Felicity Huffman said there were supposed to be a lot more bubbles, but because they were 'a little indie running a day late and a dollar short', they tried dish detergent and other things but there was not the time to do something else, so she was more exposed than anticipated."

== Soundtrack ==
The Transamerica soundtrack includes cuts written by members of Old Crow Medicine Show. Christopher Day "Critter" Fuqua wrote "Take 'Em Away", performed by the group. "We're All in This Together" was written by Ketch Secor and Willie Watson, also performed by Old Crow. Both songs were published by Blood Donor Music, administered by Bug Music, Inc. (BMI), and made available courtesy of Nettwerk Productions. "Travelin' Thru" was written and performed by Dolly Parton. The song was nominated for an Academy Award for Best Song, for the Golden Globe for Best Original Song, and for the Broadcast Film Critics Association for Best Song. According to the New York Times website, "Travelin' Thru" won for best original song at the Phoenix Film Critics Society Awards 2005. It was also nominated for a Grammy Award for Best Song from a Movie.

== Reception ==
The film received generally positive reviews. The review aggregator Rotten Tomatoes reported that 77% of critics gave Transamerica positive reviews, based on 145 reviews, and an average rating of 6.79/10, with the consensus that "a terrific performance by Felicity Huffman carries this unconventional but touching transgender road movie." Metacritic reported the film had an average score of 66 out of 100, based on 37 reviews.

Film critic Roger Ebert stated that "Felicity Huffman brings great empathy and tact to her performance as Bree."

=== Awards and nominations ===
- Independent Spirit Awards
  - Won – Best Female Lead (Felicity Huffman)
  - Won – Best First Screenplay (Duncan Tucker)
  - Nominated – Best First Feature – (Duncan Tucker, Sebastian Dungan, Linda Moran, Rene Bastian)
- Academy Awards
  - Nominated – Best Actress (Felicity Huffman)
  - Nominated – Best Original Song (Dolly Parton, for the song "Travelin' Thru")
- Berlin International Film Festival
  - Won – Reader Jury of the Siegessäule
- Broadcast Film Critics Association
  - Nominated – Best Actress (Felicity Huffman)
  - Nominated – Best Song (Dolly Parton, for the song "Travelin' Thru")
- Deauville Film Festival
  - Won – Best Screenplay (Duncan Tucker)
  - Nominated – Grand Special Prize
- GLAAD Media Awards
  - Won – Outstanding Film – Limited Release
- Golden Globe Awards
  - Won – Best Actress in a Drama (Felicity Huffman)
  - Nominated – Best Original Song (Dolly Parton, for the song "Travelin' Thru")
- National Board of Review
  - Won – Best Actress (Felicity Huffman)
- Phoenix Film Critics Society Awards 2005
  - Won – Best Original Song (Dolly Parton, for the song "Travelin' Thru")
- Satellite Awards
  - Won – Best Actress (Felicity Huffman)
- Screen Actors Guild Award
  - Nominated – Best Actress in a Lead Role (Felicity Huffman)
- Tribeca Film Festival
  - Won – Best Actress (Felicity Huffman)
- Cannes Film Festival 2006
  - Won (Chopard Trophy) – Male Revelation Kevin Zegers
- San Diego Film Festival 2005
  - Won – Best Actress (Felicity Huffman)

== Home media ==
The film was released on DVD on May 23, 2006, in North America. There are no plans for a North American Blu-ray release for it yet. However, the Blu-ray was released in Italy.

== In popular culture ==
The film is referenced in the comedy film Knocked Up, when the character played by Jason Segel admits that he was attracted to Huffman, stating that ever since he saw Transamerica, he can't get her out of his mind.

== See also ==
- Different for Girls (1996)
- List of transgender characters in film and television
