= Someone Marry Barry =

2014 romantic comedy directed by Rob Pearlstein

- Release poster
- Directed by: Rob Pearlstein
- Written by: Rob Pearlstein
- Produced by: Kate Cohen; Barry Josephson; Rob Pearlstein; Marisa Polvino
- Starring: Tyler Labine; Damon Wayans, Jr. Lucy Punch; Hayes MacArthur; Thomas Middleditch
- Cinematography: Mårten Tedin
- Edited by: Justin Bourret
- Music by: Joey Katsaros
- Production companies: Madrose Productions; Straight Up Films; Freestyle Releasing
- Distributed by: FilmBuff
- Release date: February 7, 2014 (United States)
- Running time: 87 minutes
- Country: United States
- Language: English

Someone Marry Barry is a 2014 American romantic comedy film directed and written by Rob Pearlstein and starring Tyler Labine, Lucy Punch, Damon Wayans, Jr., and Hayes MacArthur. The plot follows a group of childhood friends' plans to get rid of their socially inappropriate friend Barry by finding him a wife. Miraculously, Barry meets his female equal, making the guys' problems double.

== Cast ==
- Tyler Labine as Barry Burke
- Damon Wayans, Jr. as Desmond
- Lucy Punch as Melanie Miller
- Hayes MacArthur as Rafe
- Thomas Middleditch as Kurt
- Frankie Shaw as Camille
- Ed Helms as Ben
- Ginger Gonzaga as Juanita
- Amanda Lund as Rachael
- Jerry Minor as Taxi Driver
- Greg Germann as Bill
- Brett Gelman as Goker
- Joe Lo Truglio as Sammy (Barry's Barry)

== Production ==
On July 23, 2012, The Hollywood Reporter reported that Labine, Punch, and Wayans, Jr. had joined the cast of the film written and directed by Pearlstein. On November 1, 2013, it was announced that FilmBuff would release the film on February 13, 2014, in theaters and on VOD.

=== Filming ===
The principal photography of the film began on July 23, 2012, in Los Angeles.

== Critical reception ==
Glenn Kenny of RogerEbert.com described the film as "a Bro-dom comedy with a sharp focus on The Inappropriate Guy", criticizing its reliance on puerile humor. David Nusair of Reel Film Reviews wrote, "Someone Marry Barry‘s exceedingly mild success is due almost entirely to the efforts of an impressively charismatic roster of actors." Neil Genzlinger of The New York Times wrote, "For a gross-out movie, 'Someone Marry Barry' has a respectable number of genuinely funny moments. Over all, it's still kind of crass and lowbrow, showing a particular obsession with flatulence, but there's a good-heartedness to it that somehow overrides your gut instinct to stop watching."
