= Our Time Is Up =

2004 live action short film

- Directed by: Rob Pearlstein
- Written by: Rob Pearlstein
- Produced by: Pia Clemente; Loren Mendell; Nancy Nayor; Rob Pearlstein
- Starring: Kevin Pollack; Frankie Jay Allison; Vivian Bang; Michael Cornacchia; Mathew Frauman; Jorge Garcia; Rick Hoffman; Johnny Messner; Jerry Minor; Katheryn Winnick; Susan Pearlstein; Rob Pearlstein
- Cinematography: Jeremy Launais
- Edited by: Dick Gordon
- Music by: Asche & Spencer
- Release date: October 8, 2004 (Mill Valley Film Festival)
- Running time: 14 minutes
- Country: United States
- Language: English

Our Time Is Up is a 2004 live action short film, written and directed by Rob Pearlstein.

On January 31, 2006 it was nominated for the Academy Award for Best Live Action Short Film at the 78th Academy Awards. The designated nominees were Pearlstein and producer Pia Clemente. The film did not win; the Oscar instead went to Six Shooter.

== Plot ==
The film opens with Dr. Stern opening his home office, where he takes a phone call from a newly licensed therapist, Dr. GardenSchwartz, he met at a recent conference. GardenSchwartz implores the more established provider for insights on how he handles his doctor/patient relationships, but is rebuffed when Stern says that he is too busy. Throughout the day Stern treats various patients: a womanizer, a woman with body dysmorphia, a closeted gay man, a germophobe, a man with a phobia of turtles, a man dealing with an abusive girlfriend, a man who compulsively fondles women, and a man afraid of the dark. Stern listens to each of them carefully and assures them that although treatment is slow, that it will work over time. He then receives a call from his oncologist Dr. Williams, who informs him that he only has a few weeks to live.

Stern returns to work, but finds that he now lacks the patience he did before. Instead of telling his patients that things will work out, he is instead brutally honest with them. He tells the womanizer that his actions are a result of low self-esteem and an Oedipus complex, causing the man to walk out in anger. He tells the closeted man that he is obviously gay, the body dysmorphia woman that she doesn't need to diet, tries aversion therapy with the pervert, exposure therapy with the people with the turtle phobia, fear of the dark, and germophobe, and tells the abused boyfriend that he should throw plates back at his girlfriend. This causes some of them to leave in anger, while others return. Stern begins to hang out with his gardener, who he previously ignored, and puts his home for sale. One evening the womanizer returns to his office and thanks him for being honest with him, as it has changed his life. The other patients report similar improvements with their issues, who thank him for his work.

He then receives a call from GardenSchwartz, who again asks for advice. Stern pauses, then asks the other doctor if right now is a good time.

== Cast ==
- Kevin Pollack as Dr. Stern
- Frankie Jay Allison as Turtle Guy
- Vivian Bang as Germ-Phobic Woman
- Michael Cornacchia as Fondler
- Mathew Frauman as Abused Boyfriend
- Jorge Garcia as Gardener
- Rick Hoffman as Gay Man
- Johnny Messner as Playboy
- Jerry Minor as Man Afraid of the Dark
- Katheryn Winnick as Waif
- Susan Pearlstein as Dr. Williams
- Rob Pearlstein as Dr. GardenSchwartz

== Development ==
The concept for the film was inspired by a conversation Pearlstein had with a therapist friend, where he suggested that she take a more direct approach with treatment, to which she responded that it would be "a terrible idea". Filming took place at his parents house, which Pearlstein stated was "the only location I could afford."

== Release ==
Our Time Is Up premiered at the Mill Valley Film Festival on October 8, 2004. It would go on to screen at other film festivals such as the Festival of Short Films the following year and in 2006, was given several screenings alongside the other films nominated for the Academy Award for Best Live Action Short Film. It was also given an additional screening in 2012 at the NY Short Film Concert.

== Reception ==
Kevin Crust of The Los Angeles Times reviewed the film along with the other short movies nominated for the 2006 Academy Awards, comparing it favorably to American Beauty. Roger Moore of The Orlando Sentinel reviewed the film in a similar format, rating the overall short films five stars and calling Our Time Is Up a "one-joke wonder". Reviewers for Le Devoir and The Hollywood Reporter were also favorable.

=== Awards ===
- Best Short Film at Hamptons International Film Festival (2004, won)
- Best Comedy at Aspen Shortsfest (2005, won - shared with "Home Game" by Martin Lund)
- Academy Award for Best Live Action Short Film (2006, nominated)
