= Duncan Tucker =

American film director and screenwriter

- Born: Kansas City, United States
- Education: New York University
- Occupations: Film director, screenwriter

Duncan Tucker is an American film director and screenwriter.

Tucker was born in Kansas City and grew up between Kansas City and Phoenix, Arizona. He graduated from New York University.

After the short subject film The Mountain King (2000), which was screened at over thirty international festivals, he wrote and directed his first feature film, Transamerica in 2005. His book Many Fish is published by Ascent, and his photos and pictures are exhibited at many New York art galleries.

== Awards ==
- 2005 Verzaubert International Gay and Lesbian Film Festival — Rosebud Award (Best Feature Film) for Transamerica
- 2005 San Francisco International Gay and Lesbian Film Festival — Audience Award (Best Feature) for Transamerica
- 2005 Deauville Film Festival - Best Screenplay for Transamerica
- 2005 Berlin International Film Festival - Siegessäule Readers' Prize for Transamerica
- 2006 Independent Spirit Award for Best First Screenplay for Transamerica
- 2005 Woodstock Film Festival — Audience Award for Narrative Feature for Transamerica
- 2006 GLAAD Media Award - Outstanding Feature Limited Release
- 2006 Equality California Entertainment Award
