= Transamerica (soundtrack) =

Soundtrack album by Various artists
- Released: 2006
- Genres: Country, bluegrass, gospel
- Label: Nettwerk

Transamerica is the original soundtrack, on the Nettwerk label, of the 2005 film Transamerica starring Felicity Huffman and Kevin Zegers. The album consists of songs from various artists in the country and bluegrass genres.

== Travelin' Thru ==
The song "Travelin' Thru" was written and performed by Dolly Parton. It was nominated for the Academy Award, Golden Globe, and Grammy Award for Best Song from a Movie. Parton was a supporter of LGBT rights, including marriage equality.

This song is about a journey on the road to find home and identity. Parton references "The Wayfaring Stranger (song)" and "I Am a Pilgrim", both examples of American folk music about the search for identity on the road. Parton said she wrote the song because of her status as an outsider and her belief that "It's all right to be who you are." She wrote the song on her tour bus in one day.

In 2006, the song was nominated for the Academy Award for Best Original Song. During the 78th Academy Awards broadcast of March 5, 2006, Parton gave a rousing performance of the song live on stage. The award went to "It's Hard out Here for a Pimp" by Paul Beauregard, Jordan Houston, and Cedric Coleman.

The song was also nominated for the Golden Globe for Best Original Song and for the Broadcast Film Critics Association for Best Song, though it won neither award. According to the New York Times website, "Travelin' Thru" won for best original song at the Phoenix Film Critics Society Awards 2005.

== Track listing ==
1. "I Will Be a Woman" – Dialogue, 0:14
2. "Jol'Inkomo" – Miriam Makeba, 2:57
3. "Headin' West" — David Mansfield, 1:53
4. "Church of the Potential Father" – Dialogue, 0:05
5. "Take 'Em Away" – Old Crow Medicine Show 3:34
6. "Lay My Burden Down" – Larry Sparks, 4:53
7. "I Am a Pilgrim" – Duncan Sheik, 4:04
8. "Fish Song" – The Nitty Gritty Dirt Band, 3:33
9. "Quel Dommage" – Dialogue, 0:11
10. "There's a New Moon Over My Shoulder" – Larry Sparks, 3:00
11. "Lost in the Lonesome Pines" – Jim Lauderdale, Ralph Stanley and the Clinch Mountain Boys, 3:45
12. "I Find Jesus" – The Nitty Gritty Dirt Band, 3:53
13. "You're Gonna Love Me One Day" – Heather Myles, 3:13
14. "We're All in This Together" – Old Crow Medicine Show, 4:49
15. "High Plains" — David Mansfield, 1:26
16. "Beautiful Dreamer" – Graham Greene, 0:55
17. "Beautiful Dreamer (Score)" — David Mansfield, 2:16
18. "That'll Put Hair on Your Chest" – Dialogue, 0:08
19. "Odessa Yodel" – Wylie and the Wild West, 1:49
20. "Like a Rose" – Lucinda Williams, 2:36
21. "Travelin' Thru" – Dolly Parton, 4:54

Total runtime: 54:08
