= The Moon and the Son: An Imagined Conversation =

- Directed by: John Canemaker
- Screenplay by: John Canemaker
- Produced by: Peggy Stern
- Starring: John Turturro (voice); Eli Wallach (voice)
- Release date: 2005
- Country: United States
- Language: English

The Moon and the Son: An Imagined Conversation is a 2005 animated short film directed by animation historian John Canemaker.

== Accolades ==
2006: Academy Award for Best Animated Short Film (won)

== Summary ==
Filmmaker John Canemaker and producer/co-writer Peggy Stern employ a combination of animation, home movies and photos to present an imagined conversation between Canemaker (voiced by John Turturro) and his abusive, late father (voiced by Eli Wallach).

== See also ==
- Ryan, 2004 Oscar-winning Canadian animated short film similar in concept
- Animated documentary
- 2005 in film
