= Andy Glynne =

British filmmaker, author and producer

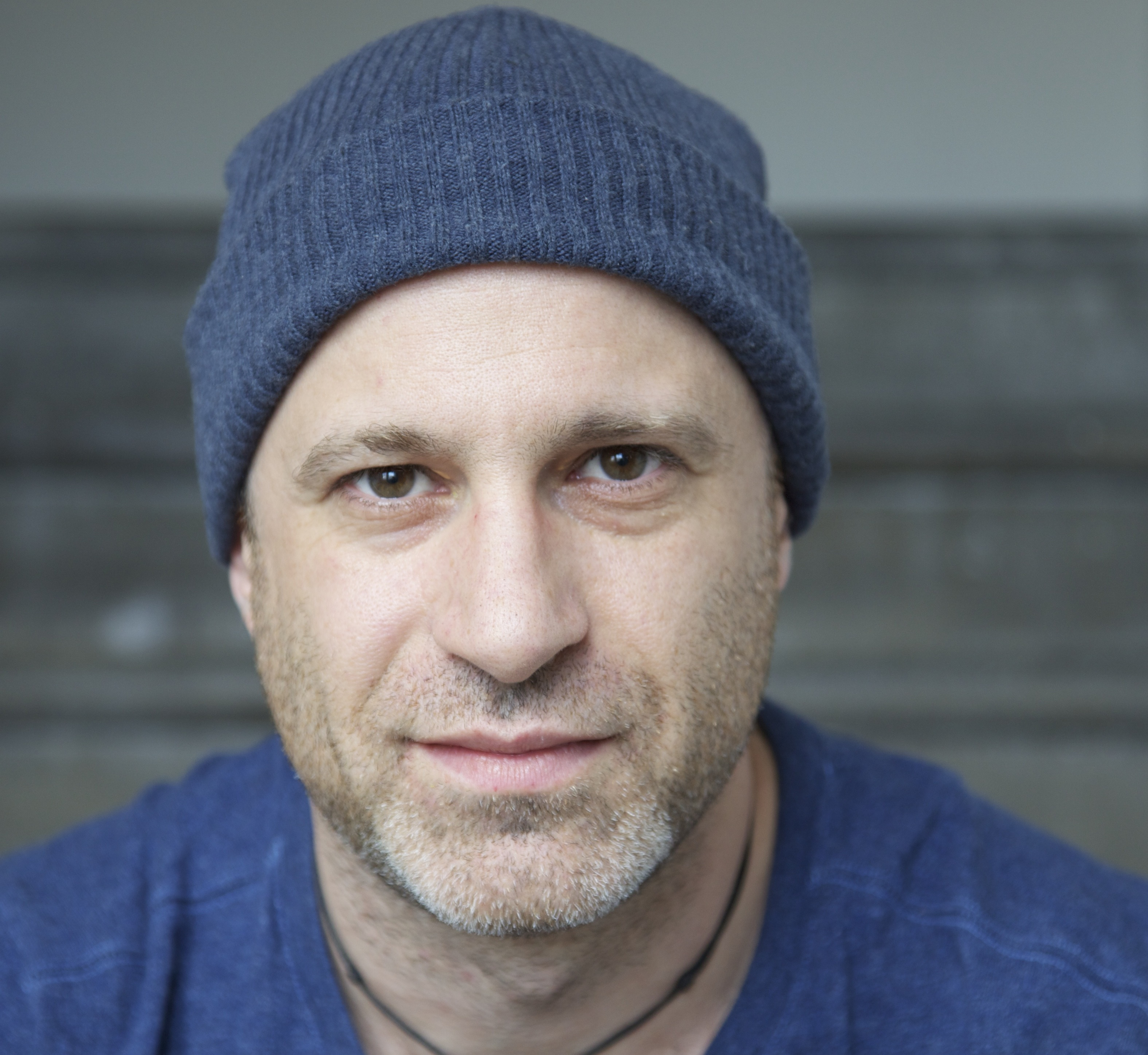

Andy Glynne (born June 1973) is a triple-BAFTA award-winning British filmmaker, author and producer. Originally trained as clinical psychologist, he has produced numerous award-winning documentaries, including the Netflix / BBC feature documentary Out of Thin Air, and Paloma Faith : As I am for BBC and has produced over 100 films in total. He has gained a reputation for his work in producing animated documentaries, for which he has won numerous awards. He is also the author of several children's books, including the series Seeking Refuge, Living with Illness, and the graphic novel Mental Health and Me, co-created with Salvador Maldonado.
