= The Sinking of the Lusitania =

1918 silent animated short documentary

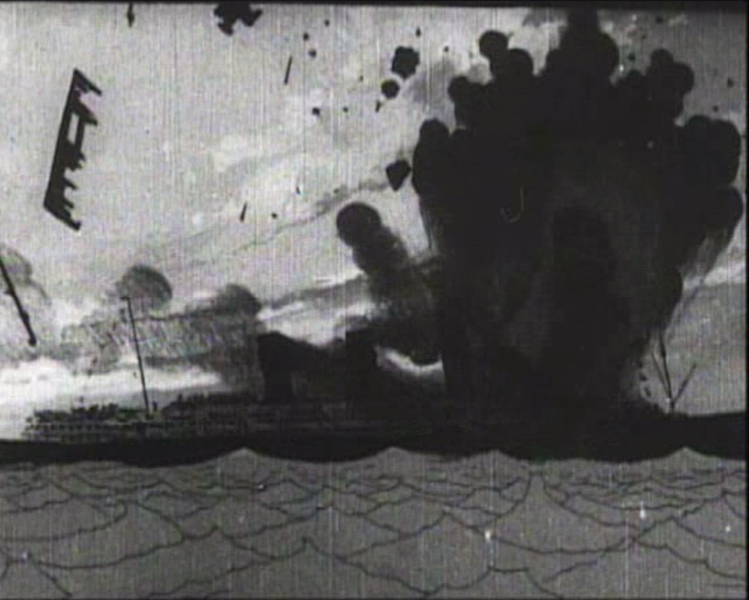
- A still from the film showing the RMS Lusitania engulfed in smoke after being torpedoed
- Directed by: Winsor McCay
- Produced by: Winsor McCay; Production manager: John D. Tippett
- Animation by: Winsor McCay; Animation assistance: John Fitzsimmons; William A. Adams
- Distributed by: Jewel Productions (unc.); Universal Films
- Release date: July 20, 1918
- Running time: 12 minutes
- Country: United States
- Language: Silent with English intertitles

The Sinking of the Lusitania (1918) is an American silent animated short film by cartoonist Winsor McCay. It is a work of propaganda re-creating the never-photographed 1915 sinking of the British liner RMS Lusitania. At twelve minutes, it has been called the longest work of animation at the time of its release. The film is the earliest surviving animated documentary and serious, dramatic work of animation. The National Film Registry selected it for preservation in 2017.

On 7 May 1915, a German submarine (SM U-20) torpedoed and sank the RMS Lusitania near Ireland; 128 Americans were among the 1,197 dead. The event outraged McCay, but the newspapers of his employer William Randolph Hearst downplayed the event, as Hearst was opposed to the U.S. joining World War I. McCay was required to illustrate anti-war and anti-British editorial cartoons for Hearst's papers. In 1916, McCay rebelled against his employer's stance and began work on the patriotic Sinking of the Lusitania on his own time with his own money.

The film followed McCay's earlier successes in animation: Little Nemo (1911), How a Mosquito Operates (1912), and Gertie the Dinosaur (1914). McCay drew these earlier films on Washi paper, onto which backgrounds had to be laboriously traced; The Sinking of the Lusitania was the first film McCay made using the new, more efficient cel technology. McCay and his assistants spent twenty-two months making the film. His subsequent animation output suffered setbacks, as the film was not as commercially successful as his earlier efforts, and Hearst put increased pressure on McCay to devote his time to editorial drawings.

== Synopsis ==
The Sinking of the Lusitania (1918)

The film opens with a live-action prologue in which McCay busies himself studying a picture of the Lusitania as a model for his film-in-progress. Intertitles boast of McCay as "the originator and inventor of Animated Cartoons", and of the 25,000 drawings needed to complete the film. McCay is shown working with a group of anonymous assistants on "the first record of the sinking of the Lusitania".

The liner passes the Statue of Liberty and leaves New York Harbor. After some time, the SM U-20 (erroneously named as "U-39" in an intertitle) slices through the waters and fires a torpedo at the Lusitania, which billows smoke that builds until it envelops the screen. Passengers scramble to lower lifeboats, some of which capsize in the confusion. The liner tilts from one side to the other and passengers are tossed into the ocean.

A second blast rocks the Lusitania, which sinks slowly into the deep as more passengers fall off its edges, and the ship submerges amid scenes of drowning bodies. The liner vanishes from sight, and the film closes with a mother struggling to keep her baby above the waves. An intertitle declares: "The man who fired the shot was decorated for it by the Kaiser! And yet they tell us not to hate the Hun."

== Background ==
Winsor McCay (c. 1869–1934) (Note: Different accounts have given McCay's birth year as 1867, 1869, and 1871. His birth records are not extant.) produced prodigiously detailed and accurate drawings since early in life. He earned a living as a young man drawing portraits and posters in dime museums, and attracted large crowds with his ability to draw quickly in public. He began working as a newspaper illustrator full-time in 1898, and in 1903 began drawing comic strips. His greatest comic strip success was the children's fantasy comic strip Little Nemo in Slumberland, which he began in 1905. In 1906, McCay began performing on the vaudeville circuit, doing chalk talks—performances during which he drew in front of a live audience.

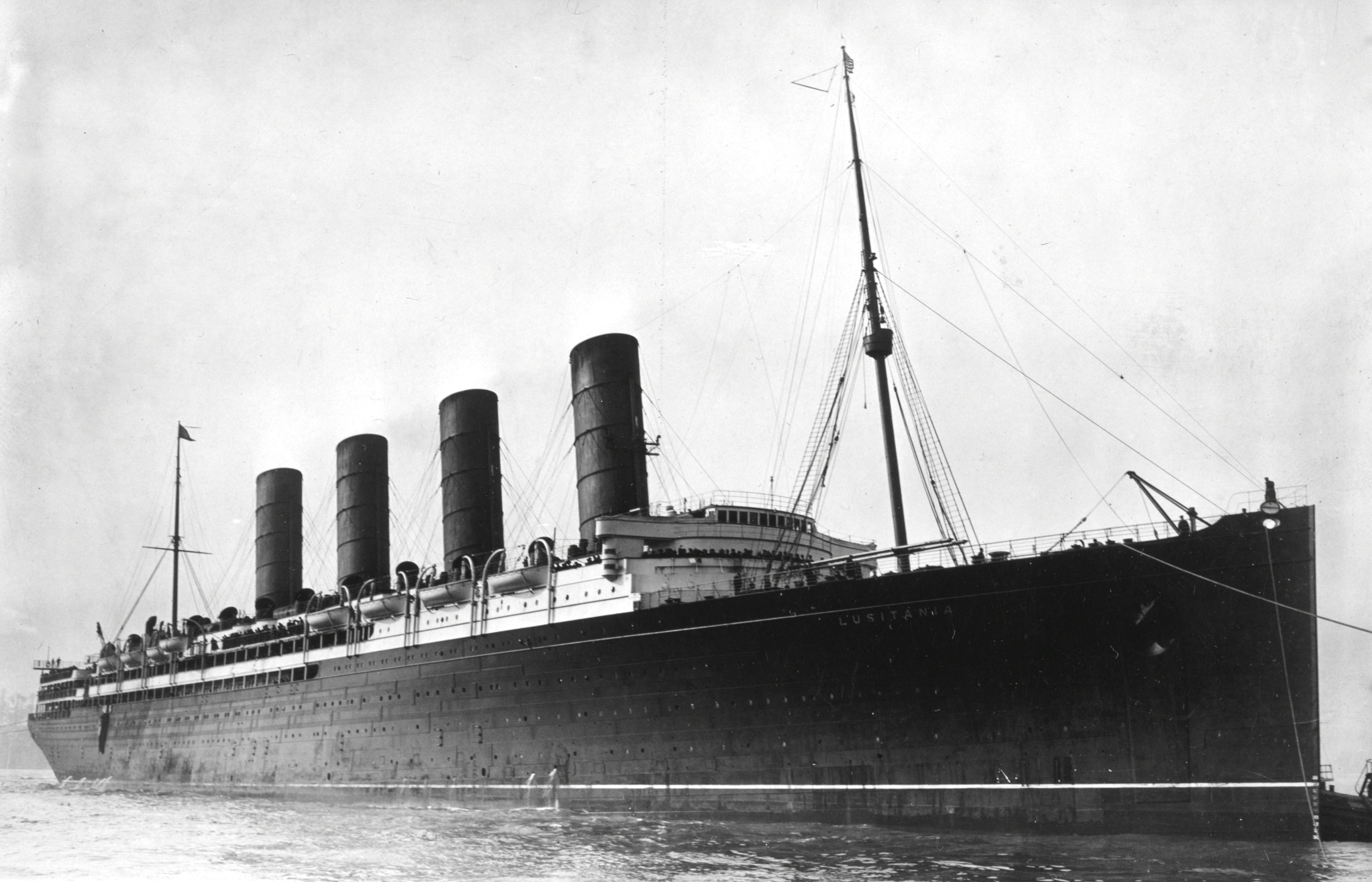
SM U-20 torpedoed and sank the RMS Lusitania in 1915; the incident contributed to the American entry into the war almost two years later.

Inspired by the flip books his son brought home, McCay said he "came to see the possibility of making moving pictures" of his cartoons. His first animated film, Little Nemo (1911), was composed of four thousand drawings on Washi paper. His next film, How a Mosquito Operates (1912), naturalistically shows a giant mosquito draw blood from a sleeping man until it bursts. McCay followed this with a film that became an interactive part of his vaudeville shows: in Gertie the Dinosaur (1914), McCay commanded his animated dinosaur with a whip on stage.

The British liner RMS Lusitania briefly held the record for largest passenger ship upon its completion in 1906. McCay displayed a fondness for it, and featured it in the episode for September 28, 1907, of his comic strip Dream of the Rarebit Fiend, and again in the episode for November 10, 1908, of A Pilgrim's Progress by Mister Bunion, where Bunion declares it "the monster boat that has smashed the record".

The Germans employed submarines in the North Atlantic during World War I, and in April 1915 the German government issued a warning that it would target British civilian ships. The Lusitania was torpedoed on May 7, 1915, during a voyage from New York; 128 Americans were among the 1,198 who lost their lives. Newspapers owned by McCay's employer William Randolph Hearst downplayed the tragedy, as Hearst was opposed to the U.S. entering the war. His own papers' readers were increasingly pro-war in the aftermath of the Lusitania. McCay was as well, but was required to illustrate anti-war and anti-British editorials by editor Arthur Brisbane. In 1916, McCay rebelled against his employer's stance and began to make the pro-war Sinking of the Lusitania in his own time.

The sinking itself was never photographed. McCay said that he gathered background details on the Lusitania from Hearst's Berlin correspondent August F. Beach, who was in London at the time of the disaster and was the first reporter at the scene. The film was the first attempt at a serious, dramatic work of animation.

== Production history ==
The Sinking of the Lusitania took twenty-two months to complete. McCay had assistance from his neighbor, artist John Fitzsimmons, and from Cincinnati cartoonist William Apthorp "Ap" Adams, who took care of layering the cels in proper sequence for shooting. Fitzsimmons was responsible for a sequence of waves, sixteen frames to be cycled over McCay's drawings. McCay provided illustrations during the day for the newspapers of William Randolph Hearst, and spent his off hours at home drawing the cels for the film, which he took to Vitagraph Studios to be photographed.

McCay's working methods were laborious. On Gertie the Dinosaur an assistant painstakingly traced and retraced the backgrounds thousands of times. Rival animators developed a number of methods to reduce the workload and speed production to meet the increasing demand for animated films. Within a few years of Nemo's release, it became near-universal practice in animation studios to use American Earl Hurd's cel technology, combined with Canadian Raoul Barré's registration pegs, used to keep cels aligned when photographed. Hurd had patented the cel method in 1914; it saved work by allowing dynamic drawings to be drawn on one or more layers, which could be laid over a static background layer, relieving animators of the tedium of retracing static images onto drawing after drawing. McCay adopted the cel method beginning with The Sinking of the Lusitania.

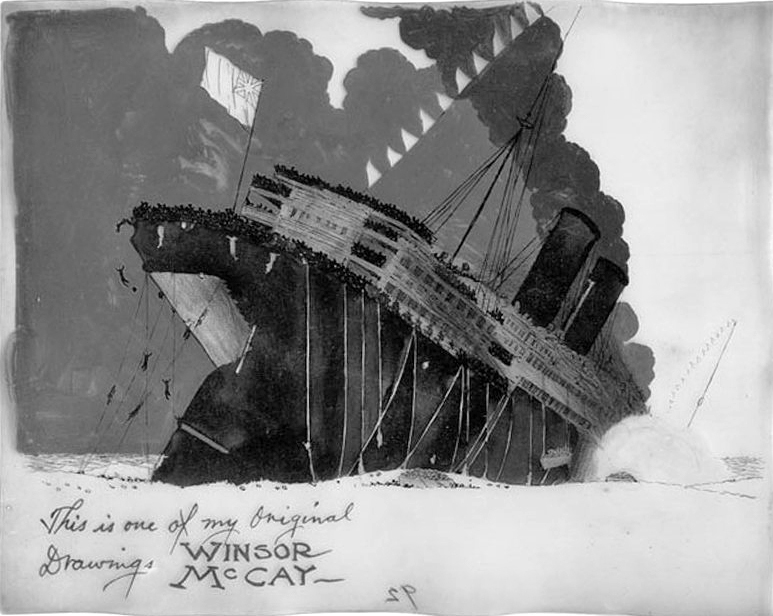
An original cel from The Sinking of the Lusitania, signed by Winsor McCay.

As with all his films, McCay financed The Sinking of the Lusitania himself. The cels were an added expense, but greatly reduced the amount of drawing necessary in contrast to McCay's earlier methods. The cels used were thicker than those that later became industry standard, and had a "tooth", or rough surface, that could hold pencil, wash, and crayon, as well as ink lines. The amount of rendering caused the cels to buckle, which made it difficult to keep them aligned for photographing; Fitzsimmons addressed this problem using a modified loose-leaf binder.

McCay said it took him about eight weeks to produce eight seconds' worth of film. The claimed 25,000 drawings (Note: Bill Mikulak notes that at 25,000 frames at 16 frames per second would make the film 26 minutes long, not 12, assuming that one drawing was produced per frame.) filled 900 feet of film. The Sinking of the Lusitania was registered for copyright on July 19, 1918, (Note: John Canemaker dates the first showing as July 20; Earl Theisen dates the première as August 15, 1918.) and was released by Jewel Productions who were reported to have acquired it for the highest price paid for a one-reel film up to that time. It was included as part of a Universal Studios Weekly newsreel and featured on the cover of an issue of Universal's in-house publication The Moving Picture Weekly. (Note: The issue of The Moving Picture Weekly for July 27, 1918.) Its première in England followed in May 1919. Advertisements called it "[t]he world's only record of the crime that shocked humanity".

== Style ==
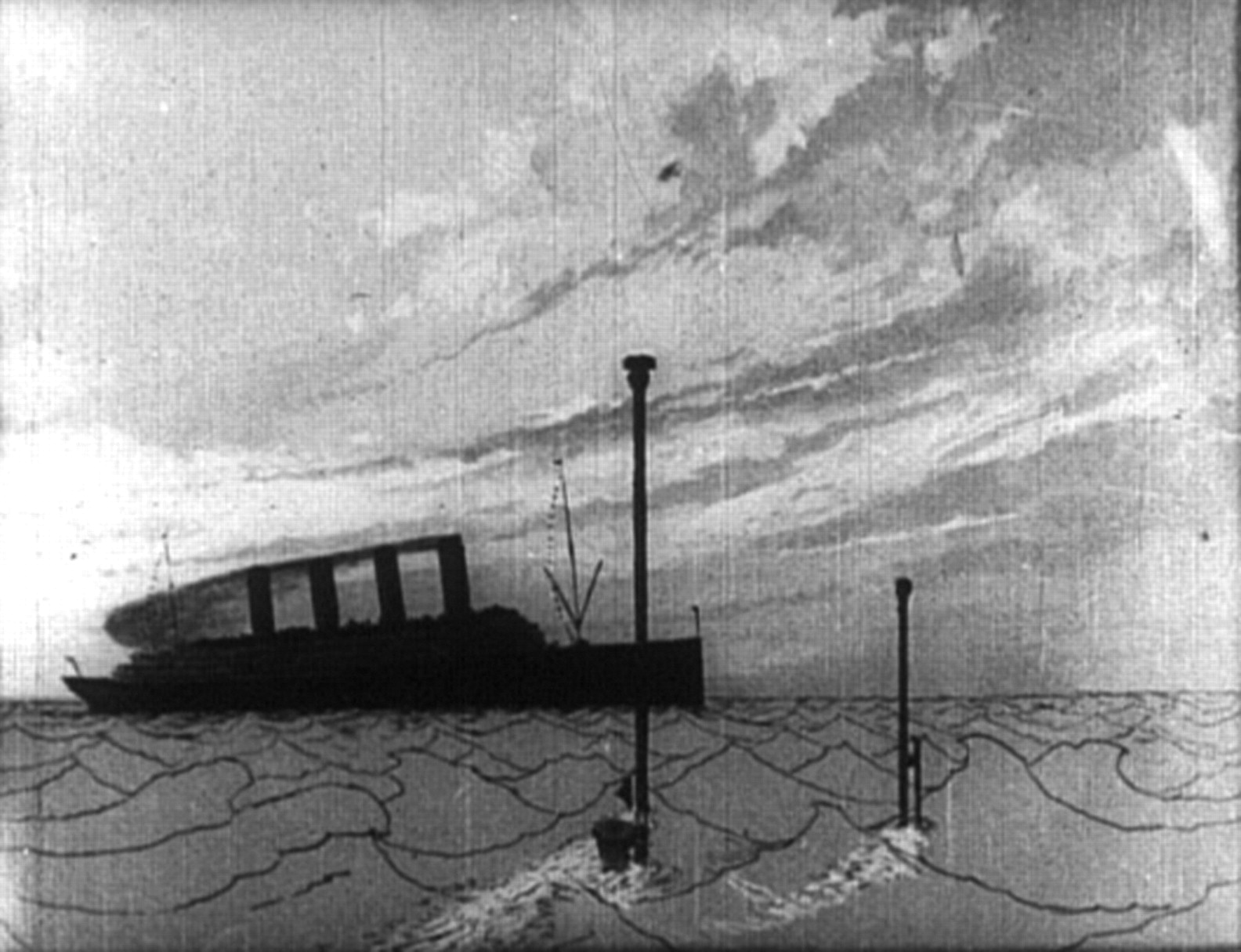
A German submarine spies on the Lusitania.

The animation combines editorial cartooning techniques with live-action-like sequences, and is considered McCay's most realistic effort; the intertitles emphasized that the film was a "historical record" of the event. McCay animated the action in what animation historian Donald Crafton describes as a "realistic graphic style". The film has a dark mood and strong propagandist feel. It depicts the terrifying fates of the passengers, such as the drowning of children and human chains of passengers jumping to their deaths. The artwork is highly detailed, the animation fluid and naturalistic. McCay used alternating shots to simulate the feel of a newsreel, which reinforced the film's realistic feel.

McCay made stylistic choices to add emotion to the "historical record", as in the anxiety-inducing shots of the submarines lurking beneath the surface, and abstract styling of the white sheets of sky and sea, vast voids which engorge themselves on the drowning bodies. Animation historian Paul Wells suggested the negative space in the frames filled viewers with anxiety through psychological projection or introjection, Freudian ideas that had begun circulating in the years before the film's release. Scholar Ulrich Merkl suggests that as a newspaperman, McCay was likely aware of Freud's widely reported work, though McCay never publicly acknowledged such an influence.

== Reception and legacy ==
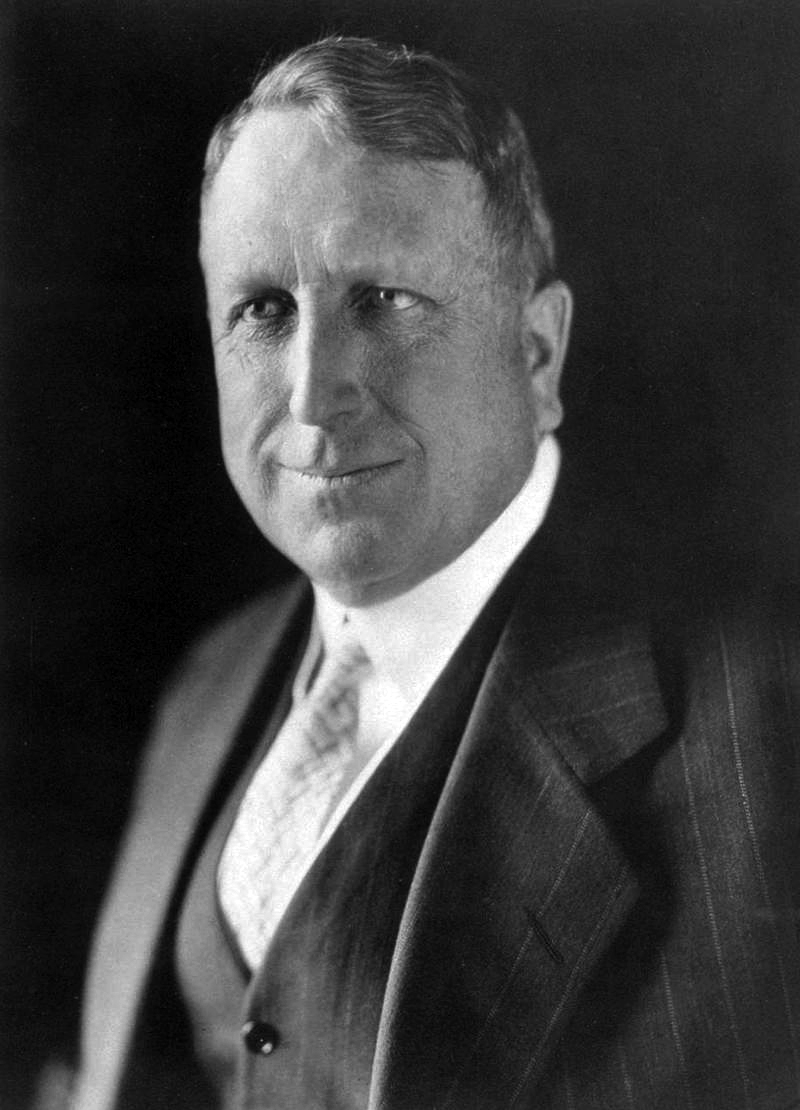
William Randolph Hearst curbed McCay's animation work to focus his employee on editorial cartooning.

The Sinking of the Lusitania was noted as a work of war propaganda, and is often called the longest work of animation of its time. (Note: The running times of surviving copies of McCay's Gertie the Dinosaur (1914) and The Sinking of the Lusitania are close in length, but the animated portion in Gertie the Dinosaur is significantly shorter than that of The Sinking of the Lusitania. An Argentine animator, Quirino Cristiani, reportedly produced a now-lost 70-minute animated film El Apóstol, whose first screening was November 9, 1917.) The film is likely the earliest animated documentary. (Note: A lost animated film from Britain depicted in animation the sinkings of the Lusitania and SS Aztec. The film was released in 1918 and may have preceded McCay's.) McCay's biographer, animator John Canemaker, called The Sinking of the Lusitania "a monumental work in the history of the animated film". Though it was admired by his animation contemporaries, Canemaker wrote that it "did not revolutionize the film cartoons of its time" as McCay's skills were beyond what animators of the time were able to follow. In the era that followed, animation studios made occasional non-fiction films, but most were comedic shorts lasting no more than seven minutes. Animation continued in its role of supporting feature films rather than as the main attraction, and rarely received reviews. The Sinking of the Lusitania was not a commercial success; after a few years in theaters, The Sinking of the Lusitania brought McCay about $80,000. McCay made at least seven further films, only three of which are known to have seen commercial release.

After 1921, when Hearst learned McCay devoted more of his time to animation than to his newspaper illustrations, Hearst required McCay to give up animation. He had plans for several animation projects that never came to fruition, including a collaboration with Jungle Imps author George Randolph Chester, a musical film called The Barnyard Band, and a film about the Americans' role in World War I. Later in life, McCay at times publicly expressed his dissatisfaction with the animation industry as it had become—he had envisioned animation as an art, and lamented how it had become a trade. According to Canemaker, it was not until Disney's feature films in the 1930s that the animation industry caught up with McCay's level of technique.

Animation historian Paul Wells described The Sinking of the Lusitania as "a seminal moment in the development of the animated film" for its combination of documentary style with propagandist elements, and considered it an example of animation as a form of Modernism. Steve Bottomore called the film "[t]he most significant cinematic version of the [Lusitania] disaster". A review in The Cinema praised the film, especially the scene in which the first torpedo explodes, which it called "more than reality". In 2017, the Library of Congress selected the film for preservation in the National Film Registry.
