= Rob Pearlstein =

Rob Pearlstein is a writer and director. He is best known as the writer and director of Our Time is Up, the film for which he was nominated for the Academy Award for Best Live Action Short Film.

Pearlstein has worked as a copywriter at agencies including TBWA Chiat/Day, Fallon McElligott, BBDO, Deutsch, Saatchi & Saatchi, and MTV. He was also among the top 10 finalists for HBO’s Project Greenlight contest.

He has sold screenplays and television pilots to major studios and networks such as Universal Pictures, Focus Features, Jerry Bruckheimer Television, and Lorne Michaels's Broadway Video Productions, and has written episodes for the NBC series Medium and the Fox series The Inside.

Pearlstein wrote, directed, and starred in Matumbo Goldberg and he also wrote and directed Someone Marry Barry.
