= The Ant Farm =

Marketing and advertising agency

Ant Farm
- Type: Subsidiary
- Industry: Marketing; Advertising
- Founded: December 2, 1996; 29 years ago in Los Angeles, California, United States
- Founders: Barbara Glazer; Michael Greenfeld
- Headquarters: Los Angeles, California, United States
- Key people: Doug Brandt (CEO); Melissa Palazzo Hart (President); Rob Troy (CCO)
- Website: www.anfarm.net

Ant Farm is an entertainment marketing and advertising agency owned by DDB Worldwide and part of the Omnicom Group.

== History ==
Founded in 1996 by Barbara Glazer and Michael Greenfeld, the agency became well known for its work on motion picture trailers and commercials. It was sold to DDB in 2002, and Glazer and Greenfeld left in 2007.

Ant Farm has multiple divisions: Theatrical, Games, Broadcast, Digital, Design, and Experiential. Ant Farm's theatrical arm is Industry Creative, which has created award-winning campaigns for the "Transformers" franchise and American Hustle.

On July 26, 2018, Ant Farm's parent company, Omnicom, announced that it would be closing Ant Farm due to a lack of profitability. The last day of operations is expected to be sometime in September 2018.

== Awards ==
In April 2014, the agency won seven Game Marketing Awards, including a Gold Award for "Best Showing at a Trade Event: E3 Experience" (Activision/Blizzard Entertainment). During 2013, Ant Farm won the Key Art Awards' "Grand Gold/Best of Show" in the Audio Visual/Teaser category for its campaign promoting, The Wolf of Wall Street. Ant Farm won a 2013 Silver Cannes Lions Award; was named the Game Marketing Awards "Agency of the Year" for 2013 and 2011 respectively. Ant Farm recently produced the trailer for Activision's "Call of Duty: Advanced Warfare". The trailer has received more than 18 million views since its release on May 2, 2014.
