= Got Talent Portugal season 3 =

Got Talent Portugal
- Season 3
- Hosted by: Sílvia Alberto; Pedro Fernandes
- Judges: Manuel Moura dos Santos; Cuca Roseta; Pedro Tochas
- Winner: António Casalinho

Release
- Original network: RTP1
- Original release: 2017 – 2017

Got Talent Portugal (season 3) is the 3rd season of the talent show Got Talent Portugal, the Portuguese version of the hit got talent show Britain's Got Talent. Each judge can press the golden buzzer once in the auditions same as last year, such as the hosts. This year a new rule was made, the judges can give a unanimous golden buzzer that means the 3 judges can press the buzzer at the same time.

Cuca Roseta is the new judge, the Portuguese fadist, replaces Sofia Escobar and Mariza.

António Casalinho was crowned the winner of this edition after winning its final on 28 May 2017, the 13-year-old young dancer also got the prize of €30,000.
