= Got Talent Portugal =

- Genre: Talent show
- Created by: Simon Cowell
- Presented by: Sílvia Alberto (2007, 2017-present); Bárbara Guimarães(2011); Marco Horácio (2015); José Pedro Vasconcelos (2016); Vanessa Oliveira (2016); Pedro Fernandes (2017-2018)
- Judges: Joaquim Monchique (2007); Sílvia Rizzo (2007); Paulo Dias (2007); Conceição Lino (2011); José Diogo Quintela (2011); Ricardo Pais (2011); Pedro Tochas (2015-2022); Manuel Moura dos Santos (2015-present); Sofia Escobar (2015-2016, 2020-2022); Rui Massena (2015, 2024-present); Mariza (2016); Cuca Roseta (2017-2022); Ines Aires Pereira (2024-present); Filomena Cautela (2024-present)
- Country of origin: Portugal
- Original language: Portuguese

Production
- Running time: 150 min (approx.)
- Production company: FremantleMedia Portugal

Original release
- Network: RTP1 (2007, 2015-present); SIC (2011)

Got Talent Portugal is a talent show adapted for Portugal from the original British show Britain's Got Talent.

The show travels the country in search of people with new and diverse talents: magicians, ventriloquists, singers, orators, dancers, street artists, acrobats, comedians, jugglers, among many others. Without an age limit, it is a unique format in searching for true talent, whether it be an individual or in a group, and gives anonymous people the opportunity to show their artistic gifts in more diverse areas.

== Seasons ==
=== RTP (2007, 2015 - present) ===
Season	Name	Episodes	Premiere	Finale	Prize	Winner	Host	Judges			
1	Aqui Há Talento!	6	January 28, 2007	March 4, 2007	€10,000	Abstractin'	Sílvia Alberto	Paulo Dias	Sílvia Rizzo	Joaquim Monchique	—N/a
1	Got Talent Portugal	13	January 18, 2015	April 12, 2015	€30,000	The Artgym Company	Marco Horácio	Manuel Moura dos Santos	Sofia Escobar	Pedro Tochas	Rui Massena
2	Got Talent Portugal	13	February 7, 2016	May 1, 2016	€30,000	Micaela Abreu	José Pedro Vasconcelos; Vanessa Oliveira	Manuel Moura dos Santos	Sofia Escobar	Mariza	Pedro Tochas
3	Got Talent Portugal	10	March 19, 2017	May 28, 2017	€30,000	António Casalinho	Pedro Fernandes; Sílvia Alberto	Manuel Moura dos Santos	Cuca Roseta	Guests (Live Shows)	Pedro Tochas
4	Got Talent Portugal	10	March 18, 2018	May 20, 2018	€30,000	Ninfas do Atlântico	Pedro Fernandes; Sílvia Alberto	Manuel Moura dos Santos	Cuca Roseta	Guests (Live Shows)	Pedro Tochas
5	Got Talent Portugal	14	January 19, 2020	June 6, 2020	€30,000	Joao Pataco & Miguel Tira-Picos	Sílvia Alberto	Manuel Moura dos Santos	Cuca Roseta	Sofia Escobar	Pedro Tochas
6	Got Talent Portugal	14	April 25, 2021	July 25, 2021		FadoAlado	Sílvia Alberto	Manuel Moura dos Santos	Cuca Roseta	Sofia Escobar	Pedro Tochas
7	Got Talent Portugal		February 13, 2022	May 1, 2022		ACCRO AAS	Sílvia Alberto	Manuel Moura dos Santos	Cuca Roseta	Sofia Escobar	Pedro Tochas
8	Got Talent Portugal	13	January 14, 2024	April 7, 2024		Sofia Rolao	Sílvia Alberto	Manuel Moura dos Santos	Inês Aires Pereira	Filomena Cautela	Rui Massena
9	Got Talent Portugal	13	January 12, 2025	March 30, 2025		Gil Brito	Sílvia Alberto	Manuel Moura dos Santos	Inês Aires Pereira	Filomena Cautela	Rui Massena
10	Got Talent Portugal	13	January 11, 2026	April 19, 2026		Free Acro Souls	Sílvia Alberto	Manuel Moura dos Santos	Inês Aires Pereira	Filomena Cautela	Rui Massena

=== SIC (2011) ===
Season	Name	Episodes	Start	Finish	Prize	Winner	Presenter	Judges		
1	Portugal Tem Talento	13	January 30, 2011	April 24, 2011	€100,000	Filipe Santos	Bárbara Guimarães	Ricardo Pais	Conceição Lino	José Diogo Quintela

== Audiences ==
Season	Channel	Time	Episodes	Transmission		Audience		Average
Season	Channel	Time	Episodes	Start	Finish	Start	Finish	Average
Portugal tem Talento	SIC	Sundays at 9:30 pm	13	January 30, 2011	April 24, 2011	16.1% 38.4% market share	8.3% 37% market share	10.5% (30.9% market share)
Got Talent Portugal 1.ª season	RTP1	Sundays at 9:00 pm	13	January 18, 2015	April 12, 2015	9.7% 20.4% market share	10.1% 22.5% market share	
Got Talent Portugal 2.ª season	RTP1	Sundays at 9:00 pm	13	February 7, 2016	May 1, 2016	12.1% 24.1% market share	10.8% 26.3% market share	
Got Talent Portugal 3.ª season	RTP1	Sundays at 9:00 pm	10	March 19, 2017	May 28, 2017	10.1% 20.8% market share	9.8% 21.6% market share	
Got Talent Portugal 4.ª season	RTP1	Sundays at 9:00 pm	to be determined	March 18, 2018	2018	to be determined	to be determined	to be determined
