= Musical theatre =

Stage work that combines songs, music, spoken dialogue, acting, and dance

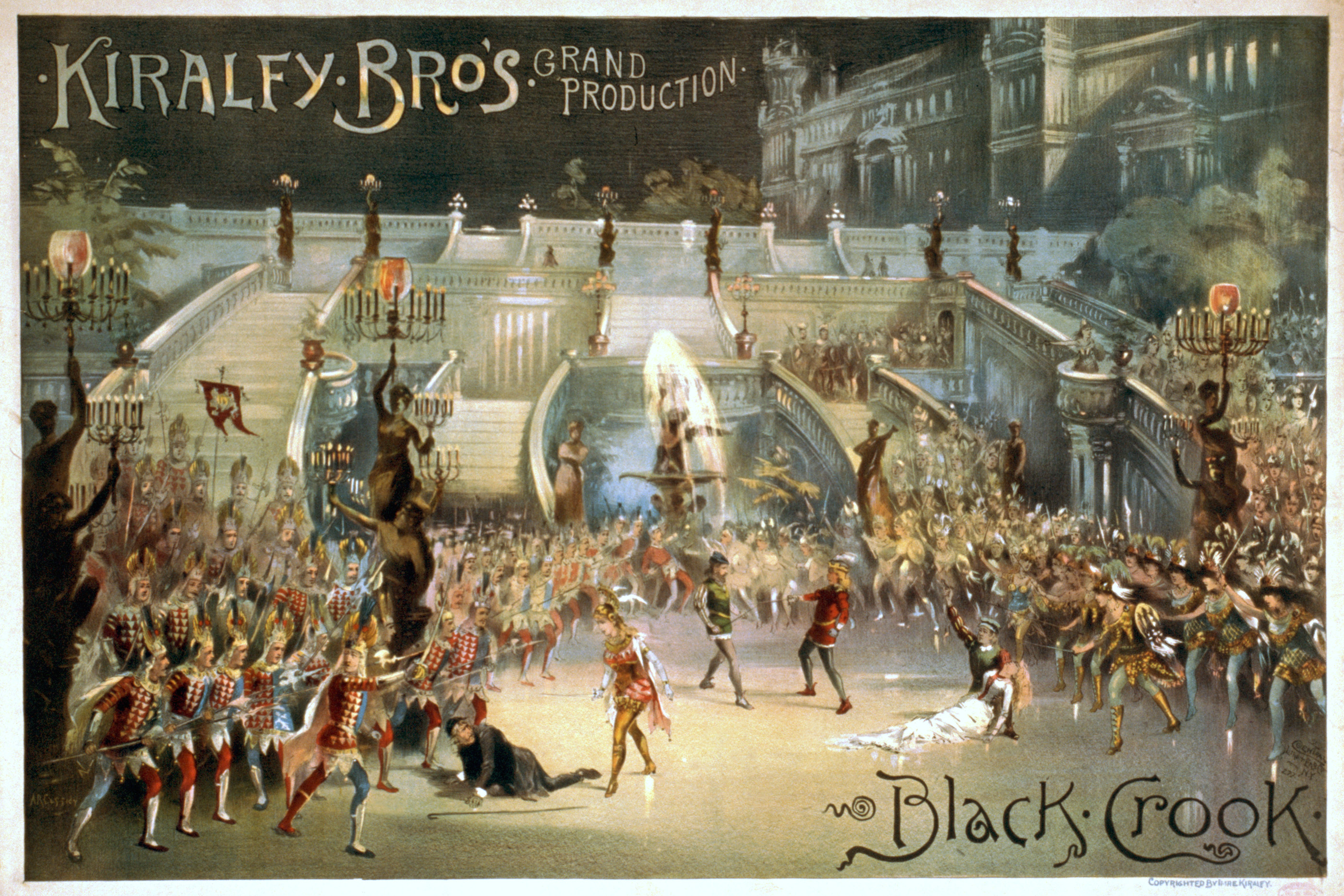
The Black Crook was a long-running musical on Broadway in 1866.

Musical theatre is a form of theatrical performance that combines songs, spoken dialogue, acting and dance. The story and emotional content of a musical – humor, pathos, love, anger – are communicated through words, music, movement and technical aspects of the entertainment as an integrated whole. Although musical theatre overlaps with other theatrical forms like opera and dance, it may be distinguished by the equal importance given to the music as compared with the dialogue, movement and other elements. Since the early 20th century, musical theatre stage works have generally been called, simply, musicals.

Although music has been a part of dramatic presentations since ancient times, modern Western musical theatre emerged during the 19th century, with many structural elements established by the light opera works of Jacques Offenbach in France, Gilbert and Sullivan in Britain and the works of Harrigan and Hart in America. These were followed by Edwardian musical comedies, which emerged in Britain, and the musical theatre works of American creators like George M. Cohan at the turn of the 20th century. The Princess Theatre musicals (1915–1918) were artistic steps forward beyond the revues and other frothy entertainments of the early 20th century and led to such groundbreaking works as Show Boat (1927), Of Thee I Sing (1931) and Oklahoma! (1943). Some of the best-known musicals through the decades that followed include My Fair Lady (1956), The Fantasticks (1960), Hair (1967), A Chorus Line (1975), Les Misérables (1985), The Phantom of the Opera (1986), Rent (1996), Wicked (2003) and Hamilton (2015).

Musicals are performed around the world. They may be presented in large venues, such as big-budget Broadway or West End productions in New York City or London. Alternatively, musicals may be staged in smaller venues, such as off-Broadway, off West End, regional theatre, fringe theatre or community theatre productions, or on tour. Musicals are often presented by amateur and school groups in churches, schools and other performance spaces. In addition to the United States and Britain, there are vibrant musical theatre scenes in continental Europe, Scandinavia, Asia, Australasia, Canada and Latin America.

== Definitions and scope ==
=== Book musicals ===
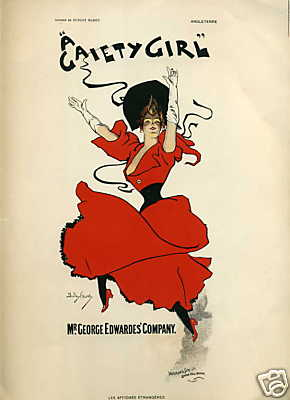
A Gaiety Girl (1893) was one of the first hit musicals.

Since the 20th century, the "book musical" has been defined as a musical play where songs and dances are fully integrated into a well-made story with serious dramatic goals and which is able to evoke genuine emotions other than laughter. The three main components of a book musical are its music, lyrics and book. The book or script of a musical refers to the story, character development and dramatic structure, including the spoken dialogue and stage directions, but it can also refer to the dialogue and lyrics together, which are sometimes referred to as the libretto (Italian for "small book"). The music and lyrics together form the score of a musical and include songs, incidental music and musical scenes, which are "theatrical sequence[s] set to music, often combining song with spoken dialogue". The interpretation of a musical is the responsibility of its creative team, which includes a director, a musical director, usually a choreographer and sometimes an orchestrator. A musical's production is also creatively characterized by technical aspects, such as set design, costumes, stage properties (props), lighting and sound. The creative team, designs and interpretations generally change from the original production to succeeding productions. Some production elements, however, may be retained from the original production, for example, Bob Fosse's choreography in Chicago.

There is no fixed length for a musical. While it can range from a short one-act entertainment to several acts and several hours in length (or even a multi-evening presentation), most musicals range from one and a half to three hours. Musicals are usually presented in two acts, with one short intermission, and the first act is frequently longer than the second. The first act generally introduces nearly all of the characters and most of the music and often ends with the introduction of a dramatic conflict or plot complication while the second act may introduce a few new songs but usually contains reprises of important musical themes and resolves the conflict or complication. A book musical is usually built around four to six main theme tunes that are reprised later in the show, although it sometimes consists of a series of songs not directly musically related. Spoken dialogue is generally interspersed between musical numbers, although "sung dialogue" or recitative may be used, especially in so-called "sung-through" musicals such as Jesus Christ Superstar, Falsettos, Les Misérables, Evita and Hamilton. Several shorter musicals on Broadway and in the West End in the 21st century have been presented in one act.

Moments of greatest dramatic intensity in a book musical are often performed in song. Proverbially, "when the emotion becomes too strong for speech, you sing; when it becomes too strong for song, you dance." In a book musical, a song is ideally crafted to suit the character (or characters) and their situation within the story; although there have been times in the history of the musical (e.g. from the 1890s to the 1920s) when this integration between music and story has been tenuous. As The New York Times critic Ben Brantley described the ideal of song in theatre when reviewing the 2008 revival of Gypsy: "There is no separation at all between song and character, which is what happens in those uncommon moments when musicals reach upward to achieve their ideal reasons to be." Typically, many fewer words are sung in a five-minute song than are spoken in a five-minute block of dialogue. Therefore, there is less time to develop drama in a musical than in a straight play of equivalent length, since a musical usually devotes more time to music than to dialogue. Within the compressed nature of a musical, the writers must develop the characters and the plot.

The material presented in a musical may be original, or it may be adapted from novels (Wicked and Man of La Mancha), plays (Hello, Dolly! and Carousel), classic legends (Camelot), historical events (Evita and Hamilton) or films (The Producers and Billy Elliot). On the other hand, many successful musical theatre works have been adapted for musical films, such as West Side Story, My Fair Lady, The Sound of Music, Oliver! and Chicago.

=== Comparisons with opera ===
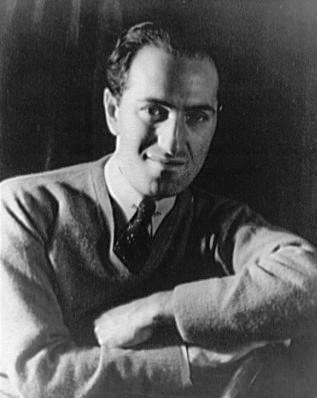
George Gershwin

Musical theatre is closely related to the theatrical form of opera, but the two are usually distinguished by weighing a number of factors. First, musicals generally have a greater focus on spoken dialogue. Some musicals, however, are entirely accompanied and sung-through, while some operas, such as Die Zauberflöte, and most operettas, have some unaccompanied dialogue. Second, musicals usually include more dancing as an essential part of the storytelling, particularly by the principal performers as well as the chorus. Third, musicals often use various genres of popular music or at least popular singing and musical styles.

Finally, musicals usually avoid certain operatic conventions. In particular, a musical is almost always performed in the language of its audience. Musicals produced on Broadway or in the West End, for instance, are invariably sung in English, even if they were originally written in another language. While an opera singer is primarily a singer and only secondarily an actor (and rarely needs to dance), a musical theatre performer is often an actor first but must also be a singer and dancer. Someone who is equally accomplished at all three is referred to as a "triple threat". Composers of music for musicals often consider the vocal demands of roles with musical theatre performers in mind. Today, large theatres that stage musicals generally use microphones and amplification of the actors' singing voices in a way that would generally be disapproved of in an operatic context.

Some works, including those by George Gershwin, Leonard Bernstein and Stephen Sondheim, have been made into both musical theatre and operatic productions. Similarly, some older operettas or light operas (such as The Pirates of Penzance by Gilbert and Sullivan) have been produced in modern adaptations that treat them as musicals. For some works, production styles are almost as important as the work's musical or dramatic content in defining into which art form the piece falls. Sondheim said, "I really think that when something plays Broadway it's a musical, and when it plays in an opera house it's opera. That's it. It's the terrain, the countryside, the expectations of the audience that make it one thing or another." There remains an overlap in form between lighter operatic forms and more musically complex or ambitious musicals. In practice, it is often difficult to distinguish among the various kinds of musical theatre, including "musical play", "musical comedy", "operetta" and "light opera".

Like opera, the singing in musical theatre is generally accompanied by an instrumental ensemble called a pit orchestra, located in a lowered area in front of the stage. While opera typically uses a conventional symphony orchestra, musicals are generally orchestrated for ensembles ranging from 27 players down to only a few players. Rock musicals usually employ a small group of mostly rock instruments, and some musicals may call for only a piano or two instruments. The music in musicals uses a range of "styles and influences including operetta, classical techniques, folk music, jazz [and] local or historical styles [that] are appropriate to the setting". Musicals may begin with an overture played by the orchestra that "weav[es] together excerpts of the score's famous melodies".

=== Eastern traditions and other forms ===
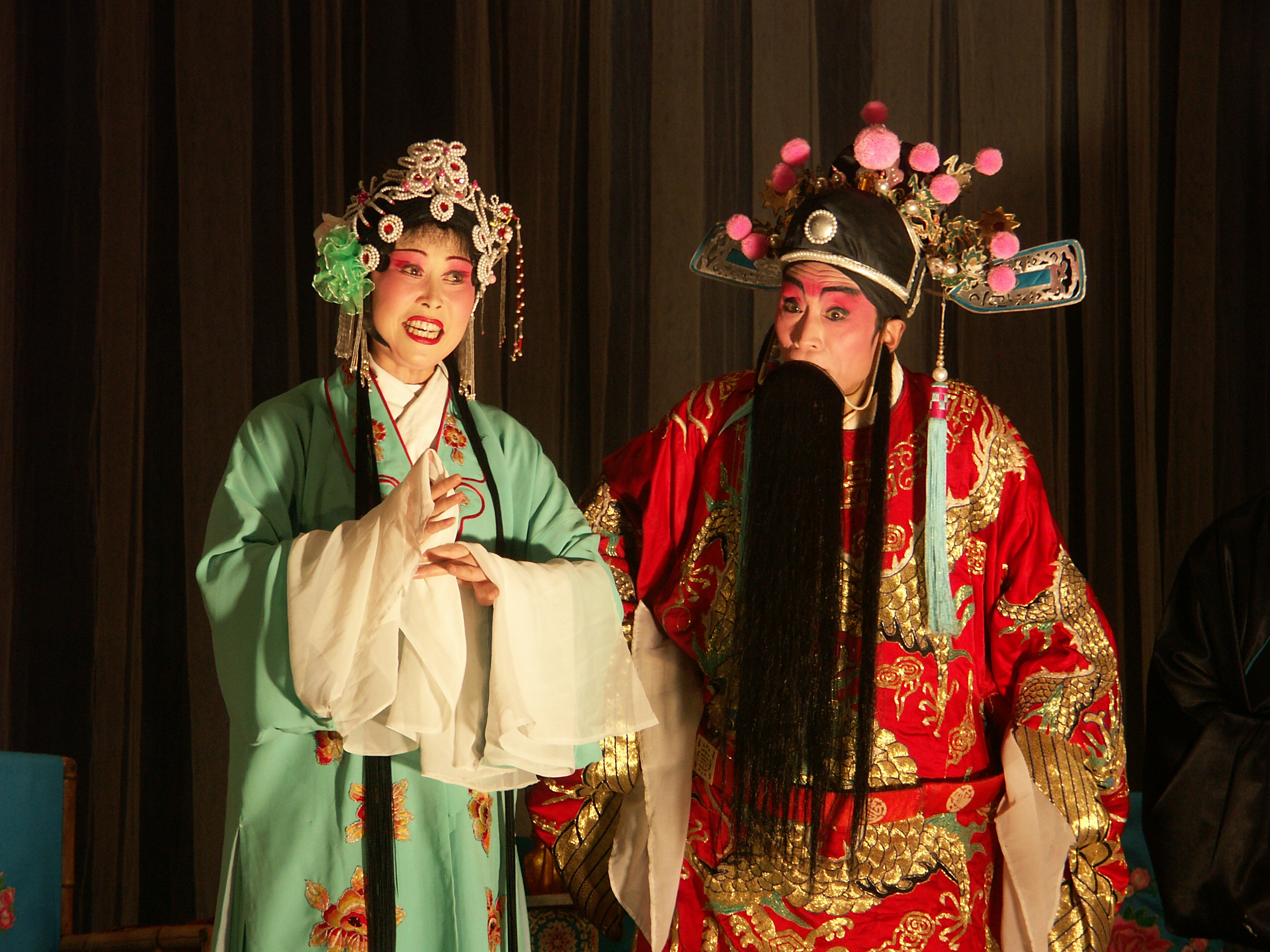
Chinese opera performers

There are various Eastern traditions of theatre that include music, such as Chinese opera, Taiwanese opera, Japanese Noh and Indian musical theatre, including Sanskrit drama, Indian classical dance, Parsi theatre and Yakshagana. India has, since the 20th century, produced numerous musical films, referred to as "Bollywood" musicals, and in Japan a series of 2.5D musicals based on popular anime and manga comics has developed in recent decades.

Shorter or simplified "junior" versions of many musicals are available for schools and youth groups, and very short works created or adapted for performance by children are sometimes called minimusicals.

== History ==
=== Early antecedents ===
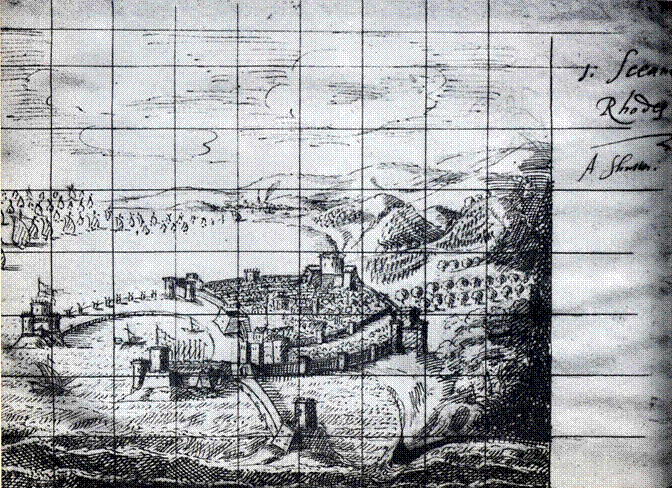
A view of Rhodes by John Webb, which was painted on a backshutter for the first performance of The Siege of Rhodes (1656)

The antecedents of musical theatre in Europe can be traced back to the theatre of ancient Greece, where music and dance were included in stage comedies and tragedies during the 5th century BCE. The music from the ancient forms is lost, however, and they had little influence on later development of musical theatre. In the 12th and 13th centuries, religious dramas taught the liturgy. Groups of actors would use outdoor Pageant wagons (stages on wheels) to tell each part of the story. Poetic forms sometimes alternated with the prose dialogues, and liturgical chants gave way to new melodies.

The European Renaissance saw older forms evolve into two antecedents of musical theatre: commedia dell'arte, where raucous clowns improvised familiar stories, and later, opera buffa. In England, Elizabethan and Jacobean plays frequently included music, and short musical plays began to be included in an evenings' dramatic entertainments. Court masques developed during the Tudor period that involved music, dancing, singing and acting, often with expensive costumes and a complex stage design. These developed into sung plays that are recognizable as English operas, the first usually being thought of as The Siege of Rhodes (1656). In France, meanwhile, Molière turned several of his farcical comedies into musical entertainments with songs (music provided by Jean-Baptiste Lully) and dance in the late 17th century. These influenced a brief period of English opera by composers such as John Blow and Henry Purcell.

From the 18th century, the most popular forms of musical theatre in Britain were ballad operas, like John Gay's The Beggar's Opera, that included lyrics written to the tunes of popular songs of the day (often spoofing opera), and later pantomime, which developed from commedia dell'arte, and comic opera with mostly romantic plot lines, like Michael Balfe's The Bohemian Girl (1845). Meanwhile, on the continent, singspiel, comédie en vaudeville, opéra comique, zarzuela and other forms of light musical entertainment were emerging. The Beggar's Opera was the first recorded long-running play of any kind, running for 62 successive performances in 1728. It would take almost a century afterwards before any play broke 100 performances, but the record soon reached 150 in the late 1820s. Other musical theatre forms developed in England by the 19th century, such as music hall, melodrama and burletta, which were popularized partly because most London theatres were licensed only as music halls and not allowed to present plays without music.

Colonial America did not have a significant theatre presence until 1752, when London entrepreneur William Hallam sent a company of actors to the colonies managed by his brother Lewis. In New York in the summer of 1753, they performed ballad-operas, such as The Beggar's Opera, and ballad-farces. By the 1840s, P. T. Barnum was operating an entertainment complex in lower Manhattan. Other early musical theatre in America consisted of British forms, such as burletta and pantomime, but what a piece was called did not necessarily define what it was. The 1852 Broadway extravaganza The Magic Deer advertised itself as "A Serio Comico Tragico Operatical Historical Extravaganzical Burletical Tale of Enchantment". Theatre in New York moved from downtown gradually to midtown from around 1850 and did not arrive in the Times Square area until the 1920s and 1930s. New York runs lagged far behind those in London, but Laura Keene's "musical burletta" Seven Sisters (1860) shattered previous New York musical theatre record, with a run of 253 performances.

=== 1850s to 1880s ===
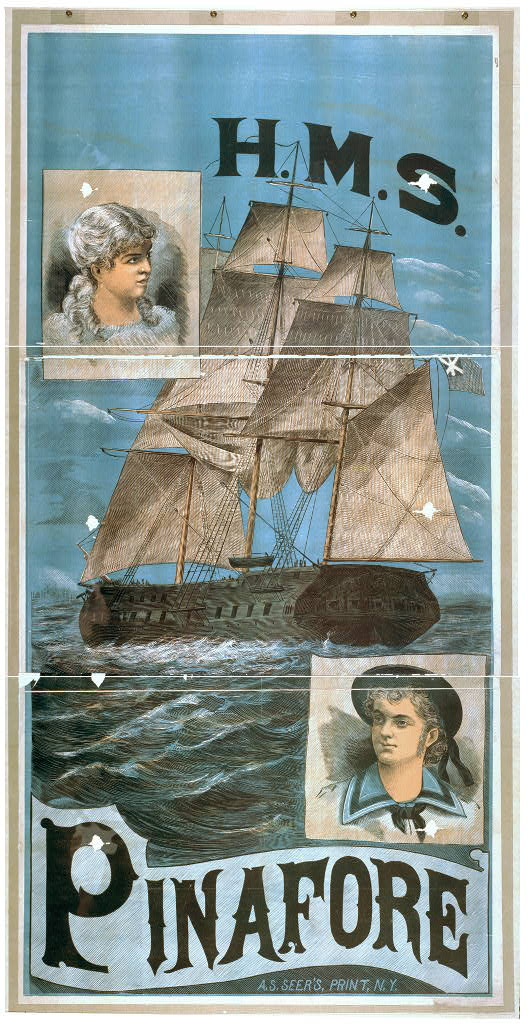
Poster, c. 1879

Around 1850, the French composer Hervé was experimenting with a form of comic musical theatre he called opérette. The best known composers of operetta were Jacques Offenbach from the 1850s to the 1870s and Johann Strauss II in the 1870s and 1880s. Offenbach's fertile melodies, combined with his librettists' witty satire, formed a model for the musical theatre that followed. Adaptations of the French operettas (played in mostly bad, risqué translations), musical burlesques, music hall, pantomime and burletta dominated the London musical stage into the 1870s.

In America, mid-19th century musical theatre entertainments included crude variety revue, which eventually developed into vaudeville, minstrel shows, which soon crossed the Atlantic to Britain, and Victorian burlesque, first popularized in the US by British troupes. Kurt Gänzl considers The Doctor of Alcantara (1862), with music composed by Julius Eichberg and a book and lyrics by Benjamin E Woolf, to be the "first American musical", though he also points to even earlier works. A hugely successful musical entertainment that premiered in New York in 1866, The Black Crook, combined dance and some original music that helped to tell the story. The spectacular production, famous for its skimpy costumes, ran for a record-breaking 474 performances. The same year, The Black Domino/Between You, Me and the Post was the first show to call itself a "musical comedy". In 1874, Evangeline or The Belle of Arcadia, by Edward E. Rice and J. Cheever Goodwin, based loosely on Longfellow's Evangeline, with an original American story and music, opened successfully in New York and was revived in Boston, New York, and in repeated tours. Comedians Edward Harrigan and Tony Hart produced and starred in musicals on Broadway between 1878 (The Mulligan Guard Picnic) and 1885. These musical comedies featured characters and situations taken from the everyday life of New York's lower classes. They starred high quality singers (Lillian Russell, Vivienne Segal and Fay Templeton) instead of the ladies of questionable repute who had starred in earlier musical forms. In 1879, The Brook by Nate Salsbury was another national success with contemporary American dance styles and an American story about "members of an acting company taking a trip down a river ... with lots of obstacles and mishaps along the way".

As transportation improved, poverty in London and New York diminished, and street lighting made for safer travel at night, the number of patrons for the growing number of theatres increased enormously. Plays ran longer, leading to better profits and improved production values, and men began to bring their families to the theatre. The first musical theatre piece to exceed 500 consecutive performances was the French operetta The Chimes of Normandy in 1878 (705 performances). English comic opera adopted many of the successful ideas of European operetta, none more successfully than the series of more than a dozen long-running Gilbert and Sullivan comic operas, including H.M.S. Pinafore (1878) and The Mikado (1885). These were sensations on both sides of the Atlantic and in Australia and helped to raise the standard for what was considered a successful show. These shows were designed for family audiences, a marked contrast from the risqué burlesques, bawdy music hall shows and French operettas that sometimes drew a crowd seeking less wholesome entertainment. Only a few 19th-century musical pieces exceeded the run of The Mikado, such as Dorothy, which opened in 1886 and set a new record with a run of 931 performances. Gilbert and Sullivan's influence on later musical theatre was profound, creating examples of how to "integrate" musicals so that the lyrics and dialogue advanced a coherent story. Their works were admired and copied by early authors and composers of musicals in Britain and America.

=== 1890s to the new century ===
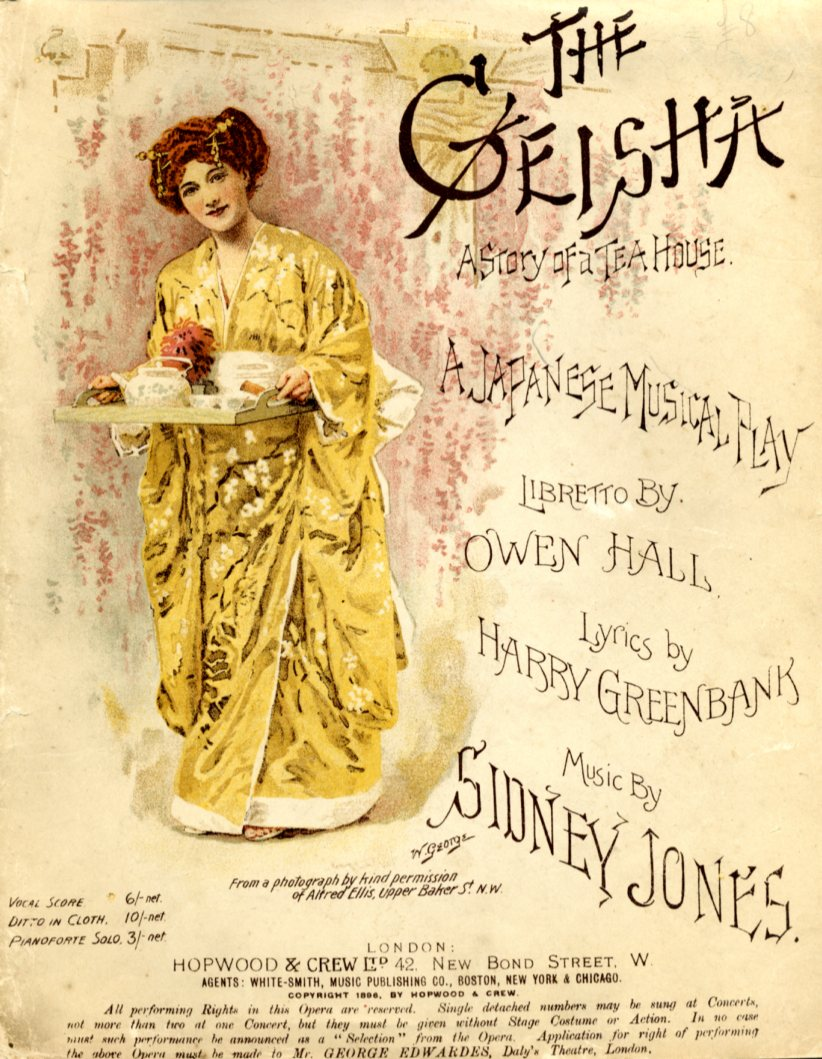
Cover of the Vocal Score of Sidney Jones' The Geisha

A Trip to Chinatown (1891) was Broadway's long-run champion (until Irene in 1919), running for 657 performances, but New York runs continued to be relatively short, with a few exceptions, compared with London runs, until the 1920s. Gilbert and Sullivan were widely pirated and also were imitated in New York by productions such as Reginald De Koven's Robin Hood (1891) and John Philip Sousa's El Capitan (1896). A Trip to Coontown (1898) was the first musical comedy entirely produced and performed by African Americans on Broadway (largely inspired by the routines of the minstrel shows), followed by ragtime-tinged shows. Hundreds of musical comedies were staged on Broadway in the 1890s and early 20th century, composed of songs written in New York's Tin Pan Alley, including those by George M. Cohan, who worked to create an American style distinct from the Gilbert and Sullivan works. The most successful New York shows were often followed by extensive national tours.

Meanwhile, musicals took over the London stage in the Gay Nineties, led by producer George Edwardes, who perceived that audiences wanted a new alternative to the Savoy-style comic operas and their intellectual, political, absurdist satire. He experimented with a modern-dress, family-friendly musical theatre style, with breezy, popular songs, snappy, romantic banter, and stylish spectacle at the Gaiety and his other theatres. These drew on the traditions of comic opera and used elements of burlesque and of the Harrigan and Hart pieces. He replaced the bawdy women of burlesque with his "respectable" corps of Gaiety Girls to complete the musical and visual fun. The success of the first of these, In Town (1892) and A Gaiety Girl (1893) set the style for the next three decades. The plots were generally light, romantic "poor maiden loves aristocrat and wins him against all odds" shows, with music by Ivan Caryll, Sidney Jones and Lionel Monckton. These shows were immediately widely copied in America, and Edwardian musical comedy swept away the earlier musical forms of comic opera and operetta. The Geisha (1896) was one of the most successful in the 1890s, running for more than two years and achieving great international success.

The Belle of New York (1898) became the first American musical to run for over a year in London. The British musical comedy Florodora (1899) was a popular success on both sides of the Atlantic, as was A Chinese Honeymoon (1901), which ran for a record-setting 1,074 performances in London and 376 in New York. After the turn of the 20th century, Seymour Hicks joined forces with Edwardes and American producer Charles Frohman to create another decade of popular shows. Other enduring Edwardian musical comedy hits included The Arcadians (1909) and The Quaker Girl (1910).

=== Early 20th century ===
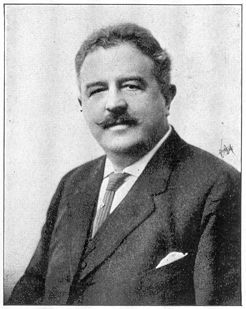
Victor Herbert

Virtually eliminated from the English-speaking stage by competition from the ubiquitous Edwardian musical comedies, operettas returned to London and Broadway in 1907 with The Merry Widow, and adaptations of continental operettas became direct competitors with musicals. Franz Lehár and Oscar Straus composed new operettas that were popular in English until World War I. In America, Victor Herbert produced a string of enduring operettas including The Fortune Teller (1898), Babes in Toyland (1903), Mlle. Modiste (1905), The Red Mill (1906) and Naughty Marietta (1910).

In the 1910s, the team of P. G. Wodehouse, Guy Bolton and Jerome Kern, following in the footsteps of Gilbert and Sullivan, created the "Princess Theatre shows" and paved the way for Kern's later work by showing that a musical could combine light, popular entertainment with continuity between its story and songs. Historian Gerald Bordman wrote:

These shows built and polished the mold from which almost all later major musical comedies evolved. ... The characters and situations were, within the limitations of musical comedy license, believable and the humor came from the situations or the nature of the characters. Kern's exquisitely flowing melodies were employed to further the action or develop characterization. ... [Edwardian] musical comedy was often guilty of inserting songs in a hit-or-miss fashion. The Princess Theatre musicals brought about a change in approach. P. G. Wodehouse, the most observant, literate and witty lyricist of his day, and the team of Bolton, Wodehouse and Kern had an influence felt to this day.

The theatre-going public needed escapist entertainment during the dark times of World War I, and they flocked to the theatre. The 1919 hit musical Irene ran for 670 performances, a Broadway record that held until 1938. The British theatre public supported far longer runs like that of The Maid of the Mountains (1,352 performances) and especially Chu Chin Chow. Its run of 2,238 performances was more than twice as long as any previous musical, setting a record that stood for nearly forty years. Even a revival of The Beggar's Opera held the stage for 1,463 performances. Revues like The Bing Boys Are Here in Britain, and those of Florenz Ziegfeld and his imitators in America, were also extraordinarily popular.

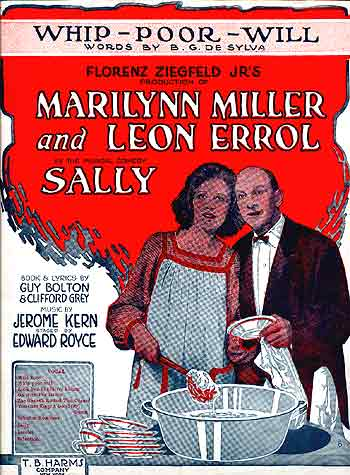
Sheet music from Sally, 1920

The musicals of the Roaring Twenties, borrowing from vaudeville, music hall and other light entertainments, tended to emphasize big dance routines and popular songs at the expense of plot. Typical of the decade were lighthearted productions like Sally; Lady, Be Good; No, No, Nanette; Oh, Kay!; and Funny Face. Despite forgettable stories, these musicals featured stars such as Marilyn Miller and Fred Astaire and produced dozens of enduring popular songs by Kern, George and Ira Gershwin, Irving Berlin, Cole Porter and Rodgers and Hart. Popular music was dominated by musical theatre standards, such as "Fascinating Rhythm", "Tea for Two" and "Someone to Watch Over Me". Many shows were revues, series of sketches and songs with little or no connection between them. The best-known of these were the annual Ziegfeld Follies, spectacular song-and-dance revues on Broadway featuring extravagant sets, elaborate costumes and beautiful chorus girls. These spectacles also raised production values, and mounting a musical generally became more expensive. Shuffle Along (1921), an all-African American show, was a hit on Broadway. A new generation of composers of operettas also emerged in the 1920s, such as Rudolf Friml and Sigmund Romberg, to create a series of popular Broadway hits.

In London, writer-stars such as Ivor Novello and Noël Coward became popular, but the primacy of British musical theatre from the 19th century through 1920 was gradually replaced by American innovation, especially after World War I, as Kern and other Tin Pan Alley composers began to bring new musical styles such as ragtime and jazz to the theatres, and the Shubert Brothers took control of the Broadway theatres. Musical theatre writer Andrew Lamb notes, "The operatic and theatrical styles of nineteenth-century social structures were replaced by a musical style more aptly suited to twentieth-century society and its vernacular idiom. It was from America that the more direct style emerged, and in America that it was able to flourish in a developing society less hidebound by nineteenth-century tradition." In France, comédie musicale was written between in the early decades of the century for such stars as Yvonne Printemps.

=== Show Boat and the Great Depression ===
Progressing far beyond the comparatively frivolous musicals and sentimental operettas of the decade, Broadway's Show Boat (1927) represented an even more complete integration of book and score than the Princess Theatre musicals, with dramatic themes told through the music, dialogue, setting and movement. This was accomplished by combining the lyricism of Kern's music with the skillful libretto of Oscar Hammerstein II. One historian wrote, "Here we come to a completely new genre – the musical play as distinguished from musical comedy. Now ... everything else was subservient to that play. Now ... came complete integration of song, humor and production numbers into a single and inextricable artistic entity."

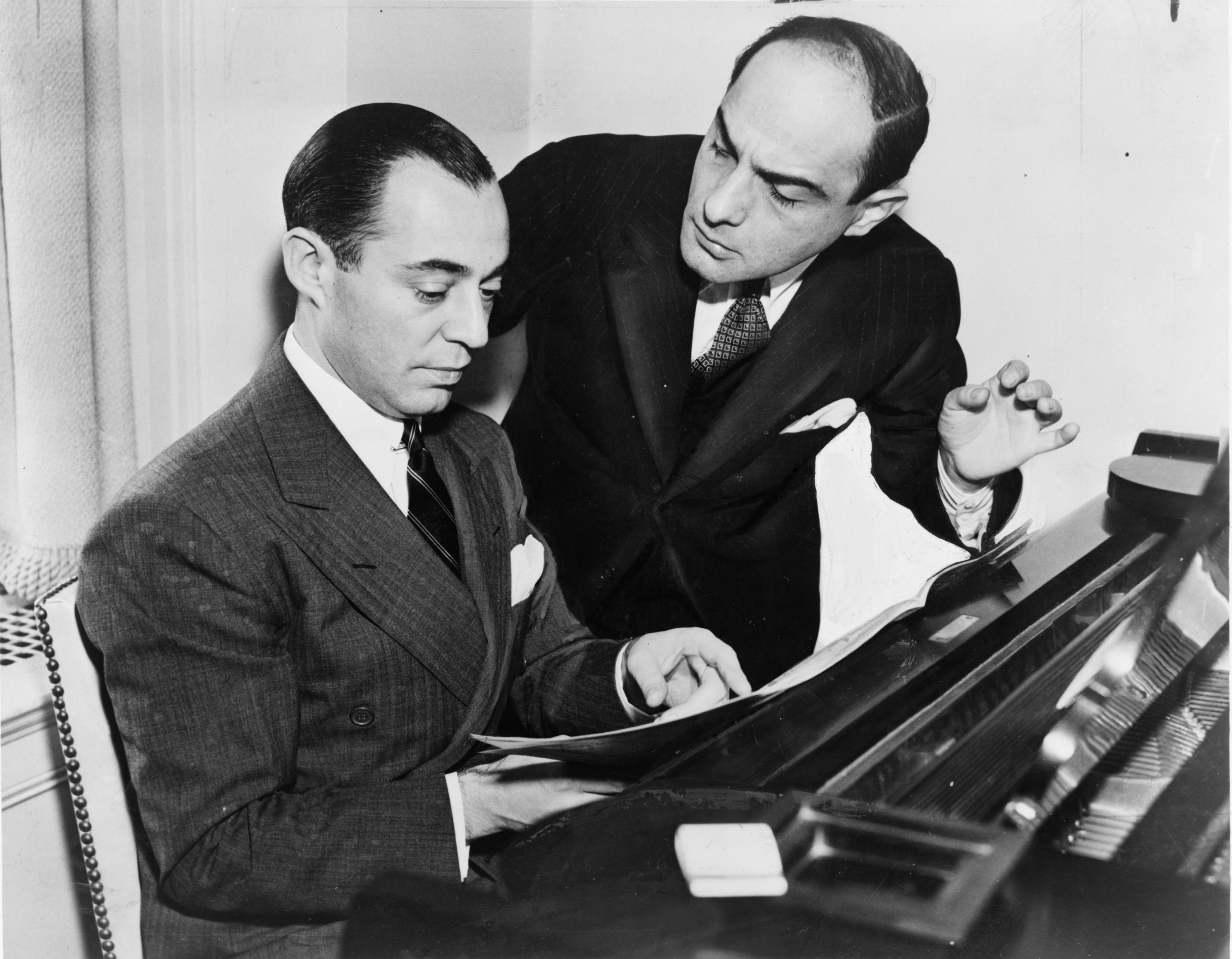
Rodgers and Hart

As the Great Depression set in during the post-Broadway national tour of Show Boat, the public turned back to mostly light, escapist song-and-dance entertainment. Audiences on both sides of the Atlantic had little money to spend on entertainment, and only a few stage shows anywhere exceeded a run of 500 performances during the decade. The revue The Band Wagon (1931) starred dancing partners Fred Astaire and his sister Adele, while Porter's Anything Goes (1934) confirmed Ethel Merman's position as the First Lady of musical theatre, a title she maintained for many years. Coward and Novello continued to deliver old fashioned, sentimental musicals, such as The Dancing Years, while Rodgers and Hart returned from Hollywood to create a series of successful Broadway shows, including On Your Toes (1936, with Ray Bolger, the first Broadway musical to make dramatic use of classical dance), Babes in Arms (1937) and The Boys from Syracuse (1938). Porter added Du Barry Was a Lady (1939). The longest-running piece of musical theatre of the 1930s in the US was Hellzapoppin (1938), a revue with audience participation, which played for 1,404 performances, setting a new Broadway record. In Britain, Me and My Girl ran for 1,646 performances.

Still, a few creative teams began to build on Show Boat's innovations. Of Thee I Sing (1931), a political satire by the Gershwins, was the first musical awarded the Pulitzer Prize. As Thousands Cheer (1933), a revue by Irving Berlin and Moss Hart in which each song or sketch was based on a newspaper headline, marked the first Broadway show in which an African-American, Ethel Waters, starred alongside white actors. Waters' numbers included "Supper Time", a woman's lament for her husband who has been lynched. The Gershwins' Porgy and Bess (1935) featured an all African-American cast and blended operatic, folk and jazz idioms. The Cradle Will Rock (1937), directed by Orson Welles, was a highly political pro-union piece that, despite the controversy surrounding it, ran for 108 performances. Rodgers and Hart's I'd Rather Be Right (1937) was a political satire with George M. Cohan as President Franklin D. Roosevelt, and Kurt Weill's Knickerbocker Holiday depicted New York City's early history while good-naturedly satirizing Roosevelt's good intentions.

The motion picture mounted a challenge to the stage. Silent films had presented only limited competition, but by the end of the 1920s, films like The Jazz Singer could be presented with synchronized sound. "Talkie" films at low prices effectively killed off vaudeville by the early 1930s. Despite the economic woes of the 1930s and the competition from film, the musical survived. In fact, it continued to evolve thematically beyond the gags and showgirls musicals of the Gay Nineties and Roaring Twenties and the sentimental romance of operetta, adding technical expertise and the fast-paced staging and naturalistic dialogue style led by director George Abbott.

=== The Golden Age (1940s to 1960s) ===
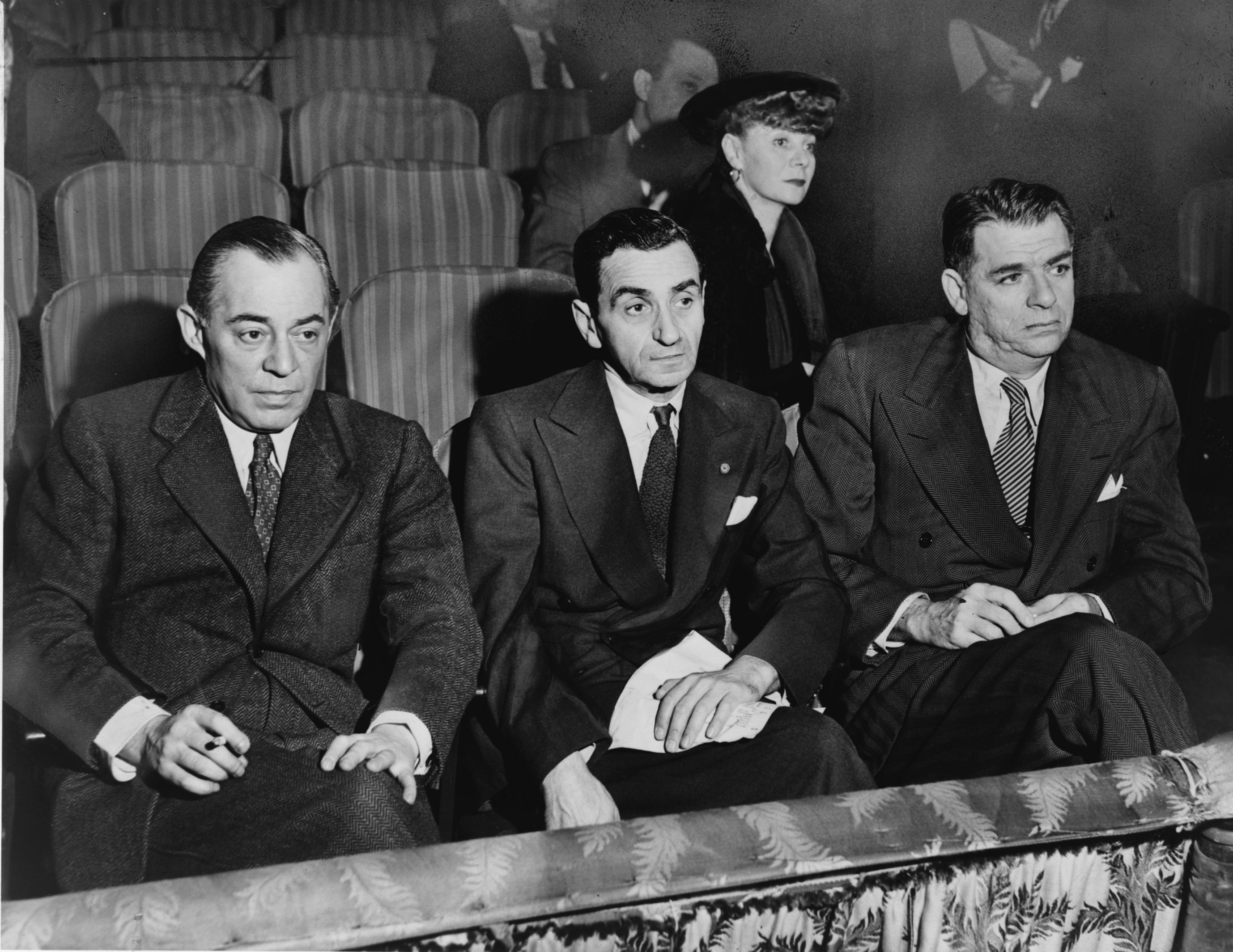
Rodgers and Hammerstein (left and right) and Irving Berlin (center) at the St. James Theatre in 1948

==== 1940s ====
The 1940s began with more hits from Porter, Irving Berlin, Rodgers and Hart, Weill and Gershwin, some with runs over 500 performances as the economy rebounded, but artistic change was in the air. Rodgers and Hammerstein's Oklahoma! (1943) completed the revolution begun by Show Boat, by tightly integrating all the aspects of musical theatre, with a cohesive plot, songs that furthered the action of the story, and featured dream ballets and other dances that advanced the plot and developed the characters, rather than using dance as an excuse to parade scantily clad women across the stage. Rodgers and Hammerstein hired ballet choreographer Agnes de Mille, who used everyday motions to help the characters express their ideas. It defied musical conventions by raising its first act curtain not on a bevy of chorus girls, but rather on a woman churning butter, with an off-stage voice singing the opening lines of "Oh, What a Beautiful Mornin'" unaccompanied. It drew rave reviews, set off a box-office frenzy and received a Pulitzer Prize. Brooks Atkinson wrote in The New York Times that the show's opening number changed the history of musical theatre: "After a verse like that, sung to a buoyant melody, the banalities of the old musical stage became intolerable." It was the first "blockbuster" Broadway show, running a total of 2,212 performances, and was made into a hit film. It remains one of the most frequently produced of the team's projects. William A. Everett and Paul R. Laird wrote that this was a "show, that, like Show Boat, became a milestone, so that later historians writing about important moments in twentieth-century theatre would begin to identify eras according to their relationship to Oklahoma!".

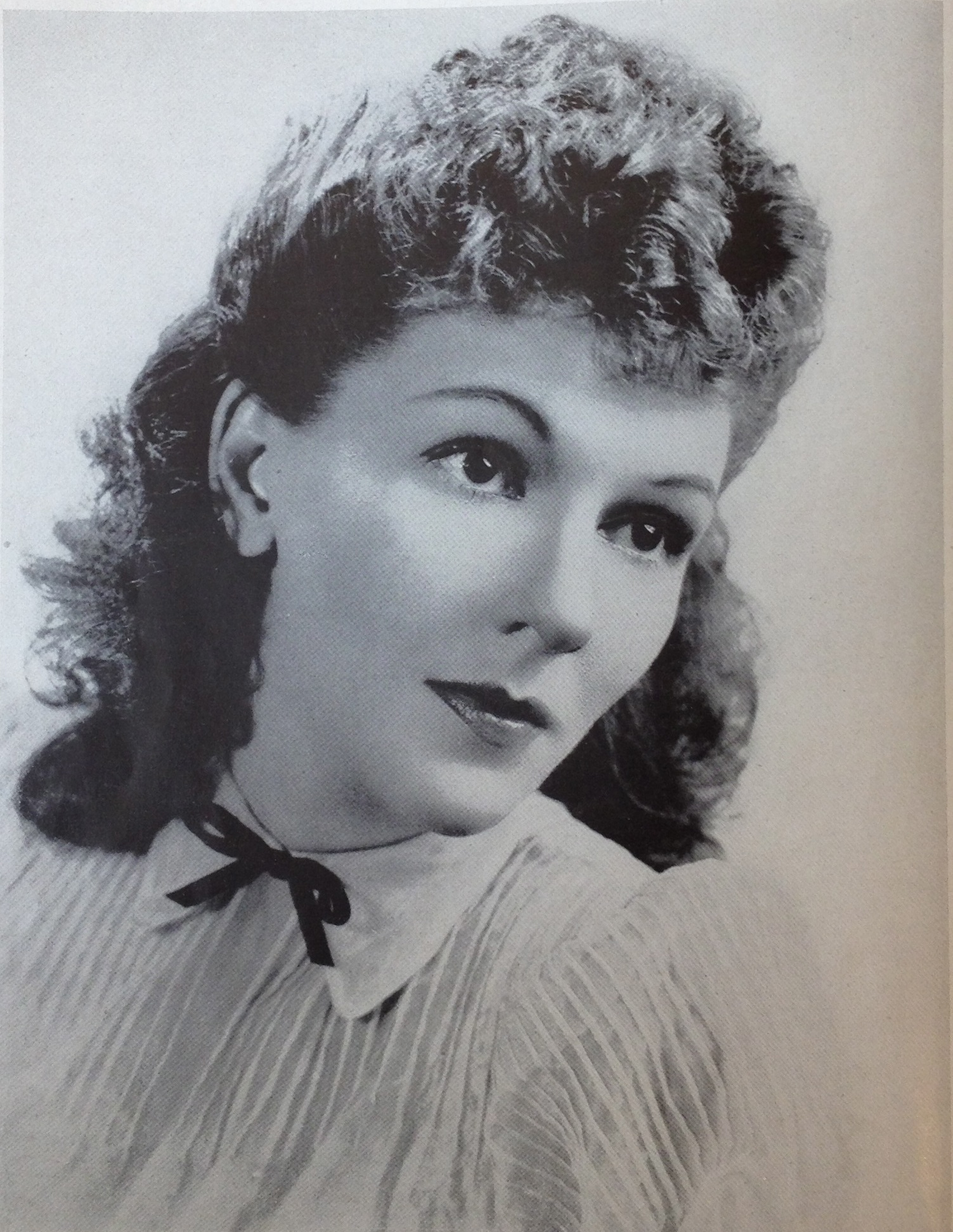
Mary Martin starred in several Broadway hits of this era

According to composer Mark Lubbock, "After Oklahoma!, Rodgers and Hammerstein were the most important contributors to the musical-play form... The examples they set in creating vital plays, often rich with social thought, provided the necessary encouragement for other gifted writers to create musical plays of their own". The two collaborators created a collection of some of musical theatre's best loved and most enduring classics, including Carousel (1945), South Pacific (1949), The King and I (1951) and The Sound of Music (1959). Some of these musicals treat more serious subject matter than most earlier shows: the antagonist in Oklahoma! is suspected of murder; Carousel deals with spousal abuse, thievery, suicide and the afterlife; South Pacific explores miscegenation; the main character of The King and I dies onstage; and the backdrop of The Sound of Music is the annexation of Austria by Nazi Germany in 1938.

The show's creativity stimulated Rodgers and Hammerstein's contemporaries and ushered in the "Golden Age" of American musical theatre. Americana was displayed on Broadway during the "Golden Age", as the wartime cycle of shows began to arrive. An example of this is On the Town (1944), written by Betty Comden and Adolph Green, composed by Leonard Bernstein and choreographed by Jerome Robbins. The story is set during wartime and concerns three sailors who are on a 24-hour shore leave in New York City, during which each falls in love. The show also gives the impression of a country with an uncertain future, as the sailors and their women also have. Irving Berlin used sharpshooter Annie Oakley's career as a basis for his Annie Get Your Gun (1946, 1,147 performances); Burton Lane, E. Y. Harburg and Fred Saidy combined political satire with Irish whimsy for their fantasy Finian's Rainbow (1947, 725 performances); and Cole Porter found inspiration in William Shakespeare's The Taming of the Shrew for Kiss Me, Kate (1948, 1,077 performances). The American musicals overwhelmed the old-fashioned British Coward/Novello-style shows, one of the last big successes of which was Novello's Perchance to Dream (1945, 1,021 performances). The formula for the Golden Age musicals reflected one or more of four widely held perceptions of the "American dream": That stability and worth derives from a love relationship sanctioned and restricted by Protestant ideals of marriage; that a married couple should make a moral home with children away from the city in a suburb or small town; that the woman's function was as homemaker and mother; and that Americans incorporate an independent and pioneering spirit or that their success is self-made.

==== 1950s ====
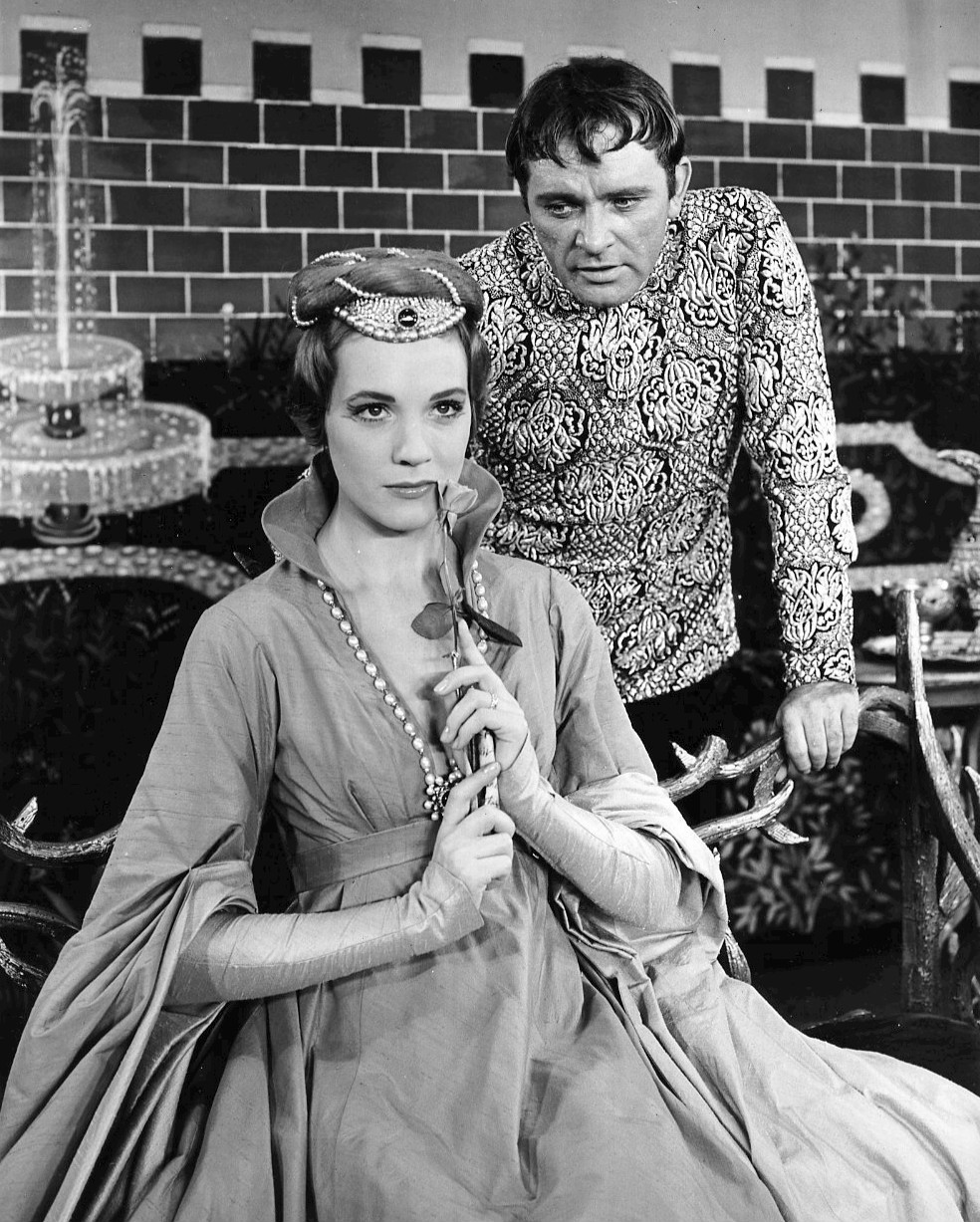
Julie Andrews with Richard Burton in Camelot (1960)

The 1950s were crucial to the development of the American musical. Damon Runyon's eclectic characters were at the core of Frank Loesser's and Abe Burrows' Guys and Dolls, (1950, 1,200 performances); and the Gold Rush was the setting for Alan Jay Lerner and Frederick Loewe's Paint Your Wagon (1951). The relatively brief seven-month run of that show did not discourage Lerner and Loewe from collaborating again, this time on My Fair Lady (1956), an adaptation of George Bernard Shaw's Pygmalion starring Rex Harrison and Julie Andrews, which at 2,717 performances held the long-run record for many years. Popular Hollywood films were made of all of these musicals. Two hits by British creators in this decade were The Boy Friend (1954), which ran for 2,078 performances in London and marked Andrews' American debut, and Salad Days (1954), which broke the British long-run record with a run of 2,283 performances.

Another record was set by The Threepenny Opera, which ran for 2,707 performances, becoming the longest-running off-Broadway musical until The Fantasticks. The production also broke ground by showing that musicals could be profitable off-Broadway in a small-scale, small orchestra format. This was confirmed in 1959 when a revival of Jerome Kern and P. G. Wodehouse's Leave It to Jane ran for more than two years. The 1959–1960 off-Broadway season included a dozen musicals and revues including Little Mary Sunshine, The Fantasticks and Ernest in Love, a musical adaptation of Oscar Wilde's 1895 hit The Importance of Being Earnest.

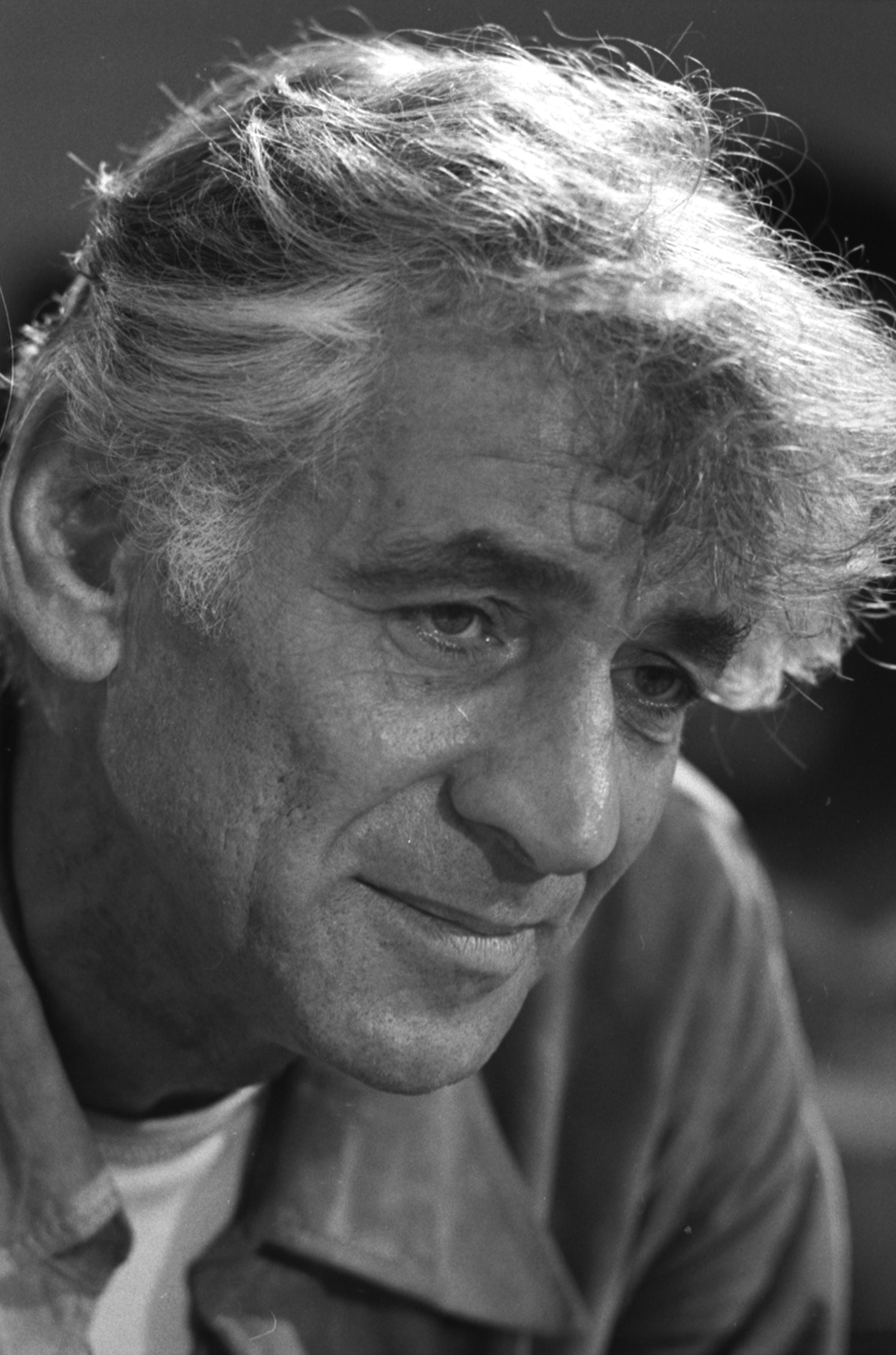
Leonard Bernstein, 1971

West Side Story (1957) transported Romeo and Juliet to modern day New York City and converted the feuding Montague and Capulet families into opposing ethnic gangs, the Jets and the Sharks. The book was adapted by Arthur Laurents, with music by Leonard Bernstein and lyrics by newcomer Stephen Sondheim. It was praised by critics for its innovations in music and choreography but was less commercially successful than the same year's The Music Man, written and composed by Meredith Willson, which won the Tony Award for Best Musical that year. West Side Story would get a film adaptation in 1961, which proved successful both critically and commercially. Laurents and Sondheim teamed up again for Gypsy (1959), with Jule Styne providing the music for a story about Rose Thompson Hovick, the mother of the titular stripper Gypsy Rose Lee.

Although directors and choreographers have had a major influence on musical theatre style since at least the 19th century, George Abbott and his collaborators and successors took a central role in integrating movement and dance fully into musical theatre productions in the Golden Age. Abbott introduced ballet as a story-telling device in On Your Toes in 1936, which was followed by Agnes de Mille's ballet and choreography in Oklahoma!. After Abbott collaborated with Jerome Robbins in On the Town and other shows, Robbins combined the roles of director and choreographer, emphasizing the story-telling power of dance in West Side Story, A Funny Thing Happened on the Way to the Forum (1962) and Fiddler on the Roof (1964). Bob Fosse choreographed for Abbott in The Pajama Game (1956) and Damn Yankees (1957), injecting playful sexuality into those hits. He was later the director-choreographer for Sweet Charity (1968), Pippin (1972) and Chicago (1975). Other notable director-choreographers have included Gower Champion, Tommy Tune, Michael Bennett, Gillian Lynne and Susan Stroman. Prominent directors have included Hal Prince, who also got his start with Abbott, and Trevor Nunn.

During the Golden Age, automotive companies and other large corporations began to hire Broadway talent to write corporate musicals, private shows only seen by their employees or customers. The 1950s ended with Rodgers and Hammerstein's last hit, The Sound of Music, which also became another hit for Mary Martin. It ran for 1,443 performances and shared the Tony Award for Best Musical. Together with its extremely successful 1965 film version, it has become one of the most popular musicals in history.

==== 1960s ====
In 1960, The Fantasticks was first produced off-Broadway. This intimate allegorical show would quietly run for over 40 years at the Sullivan Street Theatre in Greenwich Village, becoming by far the longest-running musical in history. Its authors produced other innovative works in the 1960s, such as Celebration and I Do! I Do!, the first two-character Broadway musical. The 1960s would see a number of blockbusters, like Fiddler on the Roof (1964; 3,242 performances), Hello, Dolly! (1964; 2,844 performances), Funny Girl (1964; 1,348 performances) and Man of La Mancha (1965; 2,328 performances), and some more risqué pieces like Cabaret, before ending with the emergence of the rock musical. In Britain, Oliver! (1960) ran for 2,618 performances, but the long-run champion of the decade was The Black and White Minstrel Show (1962), which played for 4,344 performances. Two men had considerable impact on musical theatre history beginning in this decade: Stephen Sondheim and Jerry Herman.

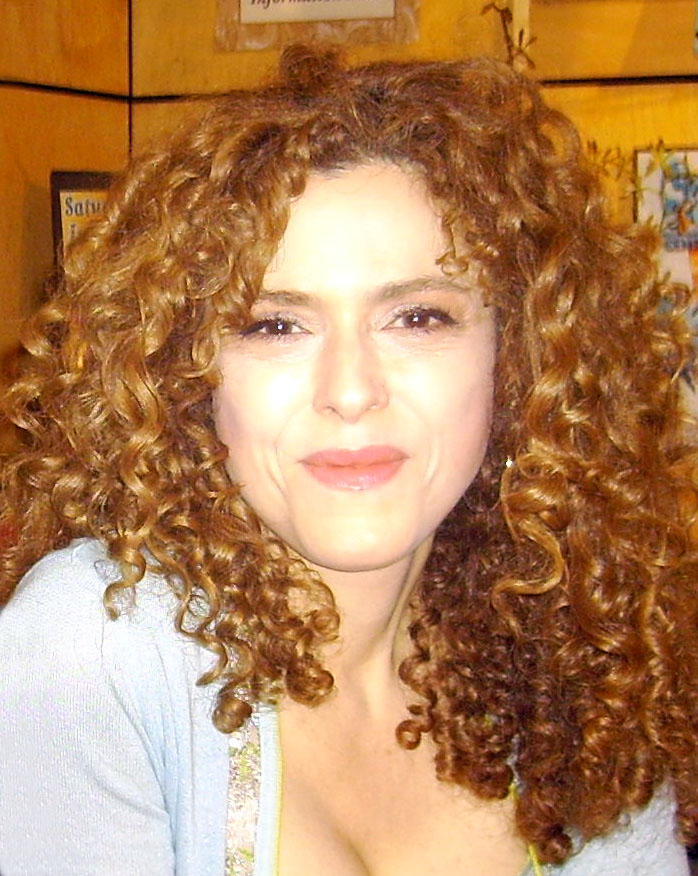
Bernadette Peters (shown in 2008) has starred in five Sondheim musicals

The first project for which Sondheim wrote both music and lyrics was A Funny Thing Happened on the Way to the Forum (1962, 964 performances), with a book based on the works of Plautus by Burt Shevelove and Larry Gelbart, starring Zero Mostel. Sondheim moved the musical beyond its concentration on the romantic plots typical of earlier eras; his work tended to be darker, exploring the grittier sides of life both present and past. Other early Sondheim works include Anyone Can Whistle (1964, which ran only nine performances, despite having stars Lee Remick and Angela Lansbury), and the successful Company (1970), Follies (1971) and A Little Night Music (1973). Later, Sondheim found inspiration in unlikely sources: the opening of Japan to Western trade for Pacific Overtures (1976), a legendary murderous barber seeking revenge in the Industrial Age of London for Sweeney Todd (1979), the paintings of Georges Seurat for Sunday in the Park with George (1984), fairy tales for Into the Woods (1987), and a collection of presidential assassins in Assassins (1990).

While some critics have argued that some of Sondheim's musicals lack commercial appeal, others have praised their lyrical sophistication and musical complexity, as well as the interplay of lyrics and music in his shows. Some of Sondheim's notable innovations include a show presented in reverse (Merrily We Roll Along) and the above-mentioned Anyone Can Whistle, in which the first act ends with the cast informing the audience that they are mad.

Jerry Herman played a significant role in American musical theatre, beginning with his first Broadway production, Milk and Honey (1961, 563 performances), about the founding of the state of Israel, and continuing with the blockbuster hits Hello, Dolly! (1964, 2,844 performances), Mame (1966, 1,508 performances), and La Cage aux Folles (1983, 1,761 performances). Even his less successful shows like Dear World (1969) and Mack and Mabel (1974) have had memorable scores (Mack and Mabel was later reworked into a London hit). Writing both words and music, many of Herman's show tunes have become popular standards, including "Hello, Dolly!", "We Need a Little Christmas", "I Am What I Am", "Mame", "The Best of Times", "Before the Parade Passes By", "Put On Your Sunday Clothes", "It Only Takes a Moment", "Bosom Buddies" and "I Won't Send Roses", recorded by such artists as Louis Armstrong, Eydie Gormé, Barbra Streisand, Petula Clark and Bernadette Peters. Herman's songbook has been the subject of two popular musical revues, Jerry's Girls (Broadway, 1985) and Showtune (off-Broadway, 2003).

The musical started to diverge from the relatively narrow confines of the 1950s. Rock music would be used in several Broadway musicals, beginning with Hair, which featured not only rock music but also nudity and controversial opinions about the Vietnam War, race relations and other social issues.

=== Social themes ===
After Show Boat and Porgy and Bess, and as the struggle in America and elsewhere for minorities' civil rights progressed, Hammerstein, Harold Arlen, Yip Harburg and others were emboldened to write more musicals and operas that aimed to normalize societal toleration of minorities and urged racial harmony. Early Golden Age works that focused on racial tolerance included Finian's Rainbow and South Pacific. Towards the end of the Golden Age, several shows tackled Jewish subjects and issues, such as Fiddler on the Roof, Milk and Honey, Blitz! and later Rags. The original concept that became West Side Story was set on the Lower East Side during Easter-Passover celebrations; the rival gangs were to be Jewish and Italian Catholic. The creative team later decided that the Polish (white) vs. Puerto Rican conflict was fresher.

Tolerance as an important theme in musicals has continued in recent decades. The final expression of West Side Story left a message of racial tolerance. By the end of the 1960s, musicals became racially integrated, with black and white cast members even covering each other's roles, as they did in Hair. Homosexuality has also been explored in musicals, starting with Hair, and even more overtly in La Cage aux Folles, Falsettos, Rent, Hedwig and the Angry Inch and other shows in recent decades. Parade is a sensitive exploration of both antisemitism and historical American racism, and Ragtime similarly explores the experience of immigrants and minorities in America.

=== 1970s to 1990s ===
==== 1970s ====
After the success of Hair, rock musicals flourished in the 1970s, with Jesus Christ Superstar, Godspell, The Rocky Horror Show, Evita and Two Gentlemen of Verona. Some of those began as "concept albums" which were then adapted to the stage, most notably Jesus Christ Superstar and Evita. Others had no dialogue or were otherwise reminiscent of opera, with dramatic, emotional themes; these sometimes started as concept albums and were referred to as rock operas. Shows like Raisin, Dreamgirls, Purlie and The Wiz brought a significant African-American influence to Broadway. More varied musical genres and styles were incorporated into musicals both on and especially off-Broadway. At the same time, Stephen Sondheim found success with some of his musicals, as mentioned above.

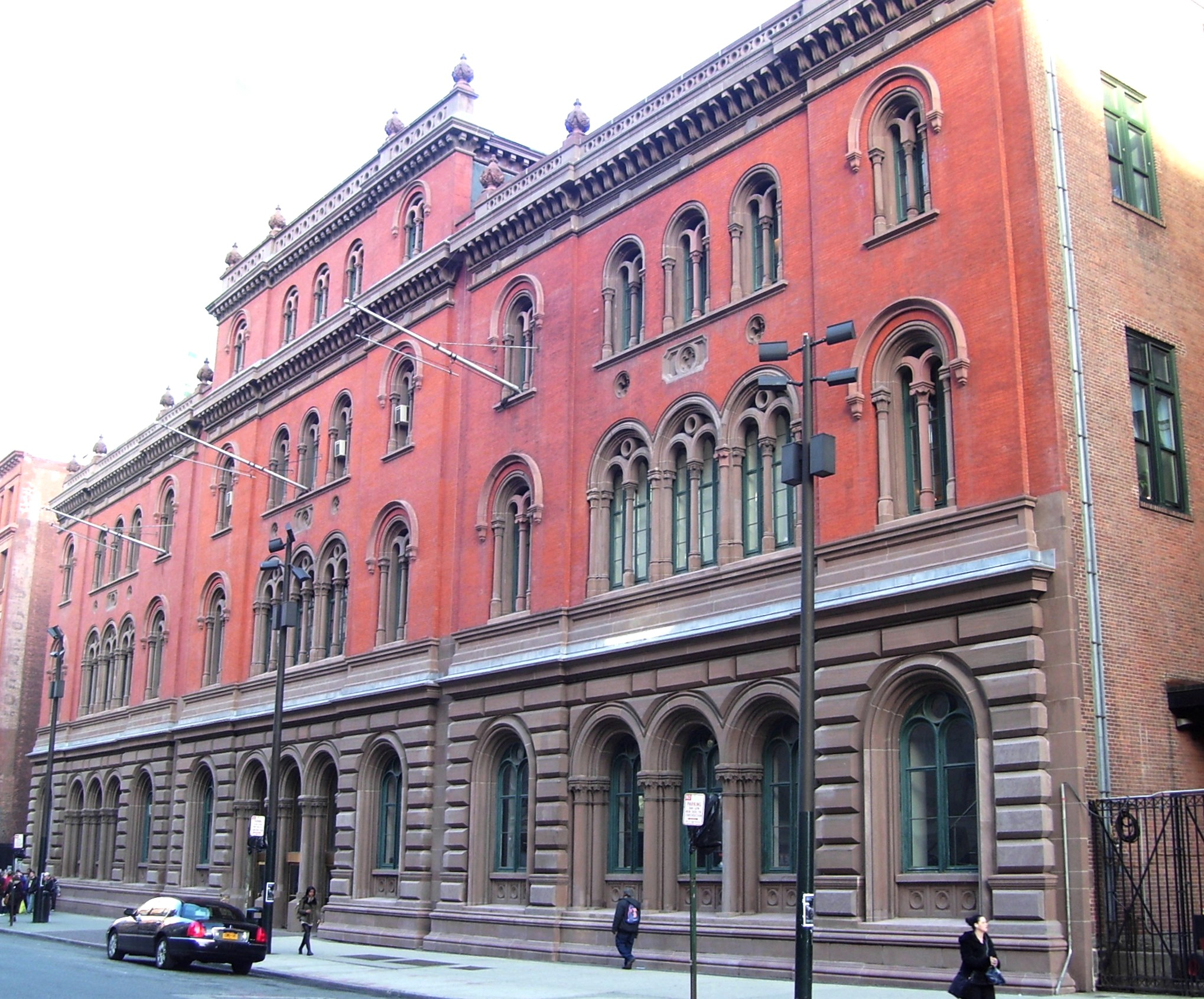
A Chorus Line was one of 55 productions that Joseph Papp's Public Theatre (building pictured) has brought to Broadway

In 1975, the dance musical A Chorus Line emerged from recorded group therapy-style sessions Michael Bennett conducted with "gypsies" – those who sing and dance in support of the leading players – from the Broadway community. From hundreds of hours of tapes, James Kirkwood Jr. and Nick Dante fashioned a book about an audition for a musical, incorporating many real-life stories from the sessions; some who attended the sessions eventually played variations of themselves or each other in the show. With music by Marvin Hamlisch and lyrics by Edward Kleban, A Chorus Line first opened at Joseph Papp's Public Theater in lower Manhattan. What initially had been planned as a limited engagement eventually moved to the Shubert Theatre on Broadway for a run of 6,137 performances, becoming the longest-running production in Broadway history up to that time. The show swept the Tony Awards and won the Pulitzer Prize, and its hit song, "What I Did for Love", became a standard.

Broadway audiences welcomed musicals that varied from the golden age style and substance. John Kander and Fred Ebb explored the rise of Nazism in Germany in Cabaret, and murder and the media in Prohibition-era Chicago, which relied on old vaudeville techniques. Pippin, by Stephen Schwartz, was set in the days of Charlemagne. Federico Fellini's autobiographical film 8½ became Maury Yeston's Nine. At the end of the decade, Evita and Sweeney Todd were precursors of the darker, big budget musicals of the 1980s that depended on dramatic stories, sweeping scores and spectacular effects. At the same time, old-fashioned values were still embraced in such hits as Annie, 42nd Street, My One and Only, and popular revivals of No, No, Nanette and Irene. Although many film versions of musicals were made in the 1970s, few were critical or box office successes, with the notable exceptions of Fiddler on the Roof, Cabaret and Grease.

==== 1980s ====
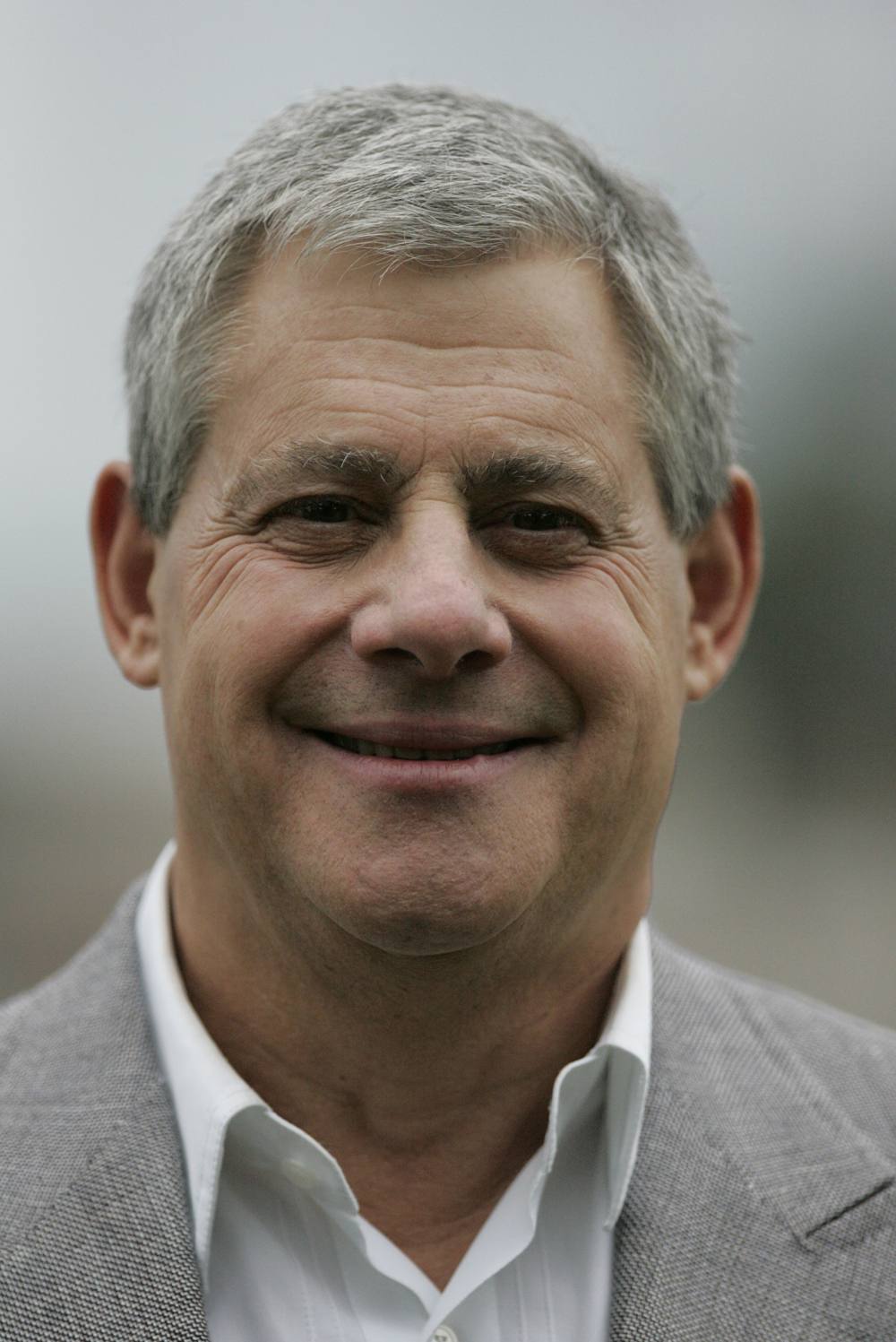
Cameron Mackintosh

The 1980s saw the influence of European "megamusicals" on Broadway, in the West End and elsewhere. These typically feature a pop-influenced score, large casts and spectacular sets and special effects – a falling chandelier (in The Phantom of the Opera); a helicopter landing on stage (in Miss Saigon) – and big budgets. Some were based on novels or other works of literature. The British team of composer Andrew Lloyd Webber and producer Cameron Mackintosh started the megamusical phenomenon with their 1981 musical Cats, based on the poems of T. S. Eliot, which overtook A Chorus Line to become the longest-running Broadway show. Lloyd Webber followed up with Starlight Express (1984), performed on roller skates; The Phantom of the Opera (1986; also with Mackintosh), derived from the novel of the same name; and Sunset Boulevard (1993), from the 1950 film of the same name. Phantom would surpass Cats to become the longest-running show in Broadway history, a record it still holds. The French team of Claude-Michel Schönberg and Alain Boublil wrote Les Misérables, based on the 1862 novel; the Mackintosh London production opened in 1985 and became, and still is, the longest-running musical in West End and Broadway history. The team produced another hit with Miss Saigon (1989), which was inspired by the Puccini opera Madama Butterfly.

The megamusicals' huge budgets redefined expectations for financial success on Broadway and in the West End. In earlier years, it was possible for a show to be considered a hit after a run of several hundred performances, but with multimillion-dollar production costs, a show must run for years simply to turn a profit. Megamusicals were also reproduced in productions around the world, multiplying their profit potential while expanding the global audience for musical theatre.

==== 1990s ====
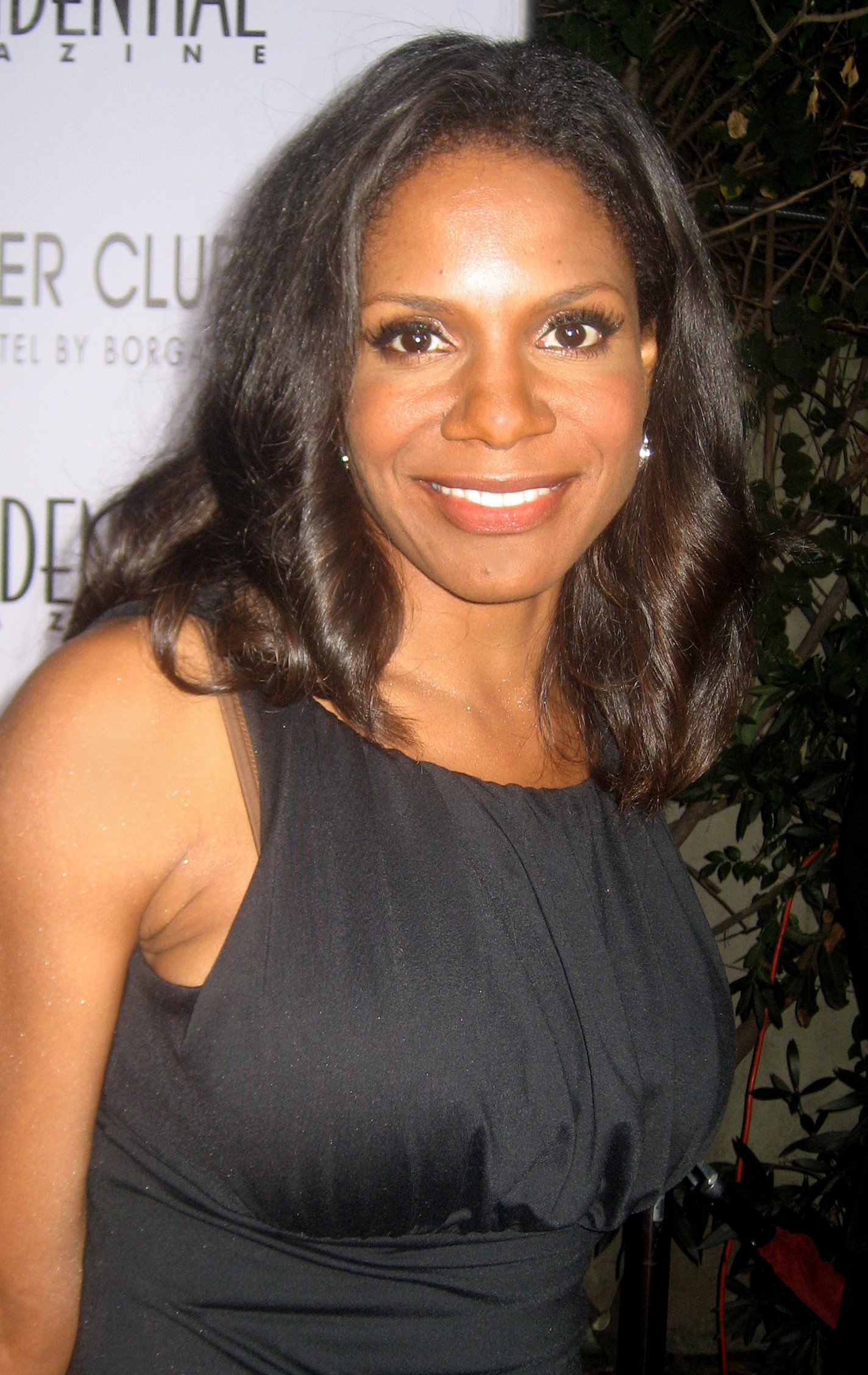
Audra McDonald

In the 1990s, a new generation of theatrical composers emerged, including Jason Robert Brown and Michael John LaChiusa, who began with productions off-Broadway. The most conspicuous success of these artists was Jonathan Larson's show Rent (1996), a rock musical (based on the opera La bohème) about a struggling community of artists in Manhattan. While the cost of tickets to Broadway and West End musicals was escalating beyond the budget of many theatregoers, Rent was marketed to increase the popularity of musicals among a younger audience. It featured a young cast and a heavily rock-influenced score; the musical became a hit. Its young fans, many of them students, calling themselves RENTheads, camped out at the Nederlander Theatre in hopes of winning the lottery for $20 front row tickets, and some saw the show dozens of times. Other shows on Broadway followed Rent's lead by offering heavily discounted day-of-performance or standing-room tickets, although often the discounts are offered only to students.

The 1990s also saw the influence of large corporations on the production of musicals. The most important has been Disney Theatrical Productions, which began adapting some of Disney's animated film musicals for the stage, starting with Beauty and the Beast (1994), The Lion King (1997) and Aida (2000), the latter two with music by Elton John. The Lion King is the highest-grossing musical in Broadway history. The Who's Tommy (1993), a theatrical adaptation of the rock opera Tommy, achieved a healthy run of 899 performances but was criticized for sanitizing the story and "musical theatre-izing" the rock music.

Despite the growing number of large-scale musicals in the 1980s and 1990s, a number of lower-budget, smaller-scale musicals managed to find critical and financial success, such as Falsettoland, Little Shop of Horrors, Bat Boy: The Musical and Blood Brothers, which ran for 10,013 performances. The topics of these pieces vary widely, and the music ranges from rock to pop, but they often are produced off-Broadway, or for smaller London theatres, and some of these stagings have been regarded as imaginative and innovative.

=== 21st century ===
==== Trends ====
In the new century, familiarity has been embraced by producers and investors anxious to guarantee that they recoup their considerable investments. Some took (usually modest-budget) chances on new and creative material, such as Urinetown (2001), Avenue Q (2003), The Light in the Piazza (2005), Spring Awakening (2006), In the Heights (2008), Next to Normal (2009), American Idiot (2010) and The Book of Mormon (2011). Hamilton (2015), transformed "under-dramatized American history" into an unusual hip-hop inflected hit. In 2011, Sondheim argued that of all forms of "contemporary pop music", rap was "the closest to traditional musical theatre" and was "one pathway to the future".

However, most major-market 21st-century productions have taken a safe route, with revivals of familiar fare, such as Fiddler on the Roof, A Chorus Line, South Pacific, Gypsy, Hair, West Side Story and Grease, or with adaptations of other proven material, such as literature (The Scarlet Pimpernel, Wicked and Fun Home), hoping that the shows would have a built-in audience as a result. This trend is especially persistent with film adaptations, including The Producers, Spamalot, Hairspray, Legally Blonde, The Color Purple, Xanadu, Billy Elliot, Shrek, Waitress and Groundhog Day. Some critics have argued that the reuse of film plots, especially those from Disney (such as Mary Poppins and The Little Mermaid), equate the Broadway and West End musical to a tourist attraction, rather than a creative outlet.

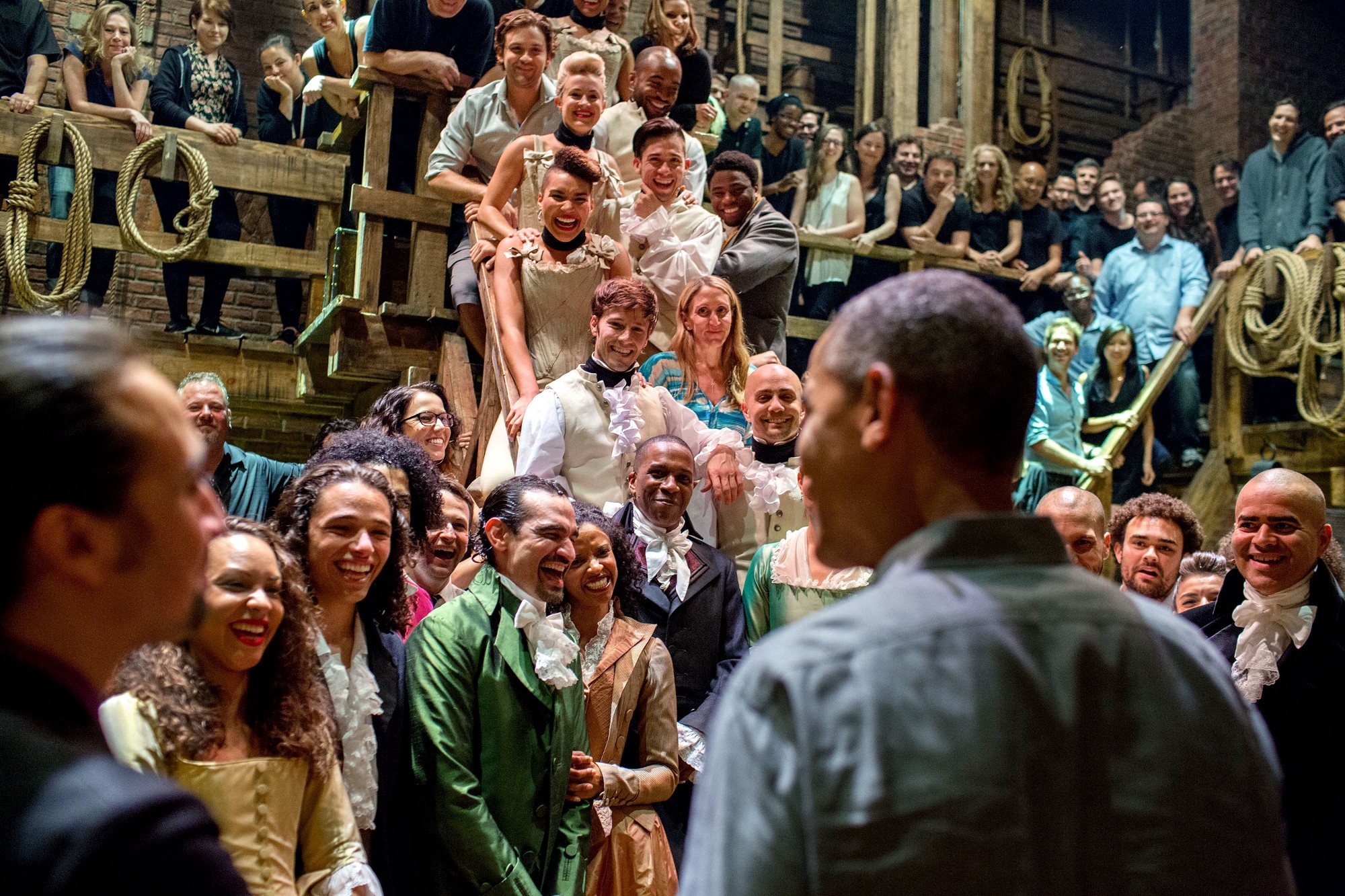
The cast and crew of Hamilton meet President Obama in 2015

Today, it is less likely that a sole producer, such as David Merrick or Cameron Mackintosh, backs a production. Corporate sponsors dominate Broadway, and often alliances are formed to stage musicals, which require an investment of $10 million or more. In 2002, the credits for Thoroughly Modern Millie listed ten producers, and among those names were entities composed of several individuals. Typically, off-Broadway and regional theatres tend to produce smaller and therefore less expensive musicals, and development of new musicals has increasingly taken place outside of New York and London or in smaller venues. For example, Spring Awakening, Fun Home and Hamilton were developed off-Broadway before being launched on Broadway.

Several musicals returned to the spectacle format that was so successful in the 1980s, recalling extravaganzas that have been presented at times, throughout theatre history, since the ancient Romans staged mock sea battles. Examples include the musical adaptations of Lord of the Rings (2007), Gone with the Wind (2008) and Spider-Man: Turn Off the Dark (2011). These musicals involved songwriters with little theatrical experience, and the expensive productions generally lost money. Conversely, The Drowsy Chaperone, Avenue Q, The 25th Annual Putnam County Spelling Bee, Xanadu and Fun Home, among others, have been presented in smaller-scale productions, mostly uninterrupted by an intermission, with short running times, and enjoyed financial success. In 2013, Time magazine reported that a trend off-Broadway has been "immersive" theatre, citing shows such as Natasha, Pierre & The Great Comet of 1812 (2012) and Here Lies Love (2013) in which the staging takes place around and within the audience. The shows set a joint record, each receiving 11 nominations for Lucille Lortel Awards, and feature contemporary scores.

In 2013, Cyndi Lauper was the "first female composer to win the [Tony for] Best Score without a male collaborator" for writing the music and lyrics for Kinky Boots. In 2015, for the first time, an all-female writing team, Lisa Kron and Jeanine Tesori, won the Tony Award for Best Original Score (and Best Book for Kron) for Fun Home, although work by male songwriters continues to be produced more often.

==== Jukebox musicals ====
Another trend has been to create a minimal plot to fit a collection of songs that have already been hits. Following the earlier success of Buddy – The Buddy Holly Story, these have included Movin' Out (2002, based on the tunes of Billy Joel), Jersey Boys (2006, The Four Seasons), Rock of Ages (2009, featuring classic rock of the 1980s), Thriller – Live (2009, Michael Jackson), and many others. This style is often referred to as the "jukebox musical". Similar but more plot-driven musicals have been built around the canon of a particular pop group including Mamma Mia! (1999, based on the songs of ABBA), Our House (2002, based on the songs of Madness), We Will Rock You (2002, based on the songs of Queen) and & Juliet (2022, based on the songs of Max Martin).

==== Film and TV musicals ====
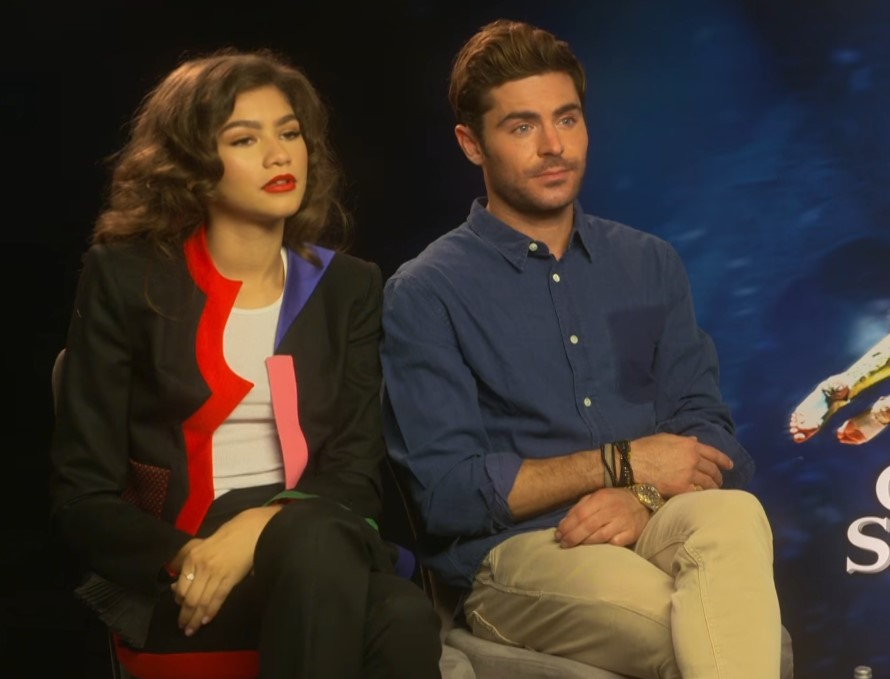
Zac Efron and Zendaya starred with Hugh Jackman in The Greatest Showman

Live-action film musicals were nearly dead in the 1980s and early 1990s, with exceptions of Victor/Victoria, Little Shop of Horrors and Evita. In the new century, Baz Luhrmann began a revival of the film musical with Moulin Rouge! (2001). This was followed by Chicago (2002); Phantom of the Opera (2004); Rent (2005); Dreamgirls (2006); Hairspray, Enchanted and Sweeney Todd (all in 2007); Mamma Mia! (2008); Nine (2009); Les Misérables and Pitch Perfect (both in 2012), Into The Woods, The Last Five Years (2014), La La Land (2016), The Greatest Showman (2017), A Star Is Born and Mary Poppins Returns (both 2018), Rocketman (2019) and In the Heights and Steven Spielberg's version of West Side Story (both in 2021), among others. Dr. Seuss's How the Grinch Stole Christmas! (2000) and The Cat in the Hat (2003), turned children's books into live-action film musicals. After the immense success of Disney and other houses with animated film musicals beginning with The Little Mermaid in 1989 and running throughout the 1990s (including some more adult-themed films, like South Park: Bigger, Longer & Uncut (1999)), fewer animated film musicals were released in the first decade of the 21st century. The genre made a comeback beginning in 2010 with Tangled (2010), Rio (2011) and Frozen (2013). In Asia, India continues to produce numerous "Bollywood" film musicals, and Japan produces anime and manga film musicals.

Made for TV musical films were popular in the 1990s, such as Gypsy (1993), Cinderella (1997) and Annie (1999). Several made for TV musicals in the first decade of the 21st century were adaptations of the stage version, such as South Pacific (2001), The Music Man (2003) and Once Upon a Mattress (2005), and a televised version of the stage musical Legally Blonde in 2007. Additionally, several musicals were filmed on stage and broadcast on Public Television, for example Contact in 2002 and Kiss Me, Kate and Oklahoma! in 2003. The made-for-TV musical High School Musical (2006), and its several sequels, enjoyed particular success and were adapted for stage musicals and other media.

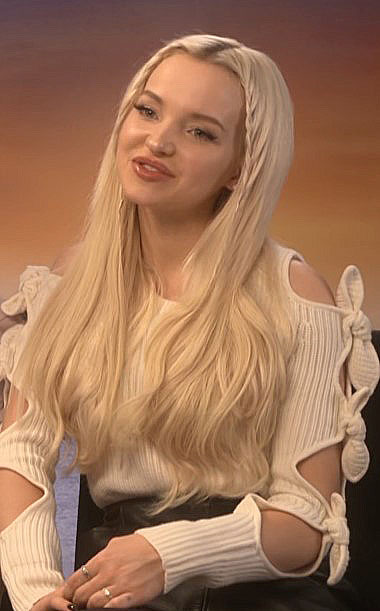
Dove Cameron has starred in such TV musicals as Descendants, Hairspray Live! and Schmigadoon!

In 2013, NBC began a series of live television broadcasts of musicals with The Sound of Music Live! Although the production received mixed reviews, it was a ratings success. Further broadcasts have included Peter Pan Live! (NBC 2014), The Wiz Live! (NBC 2015), a UK broadcast, The Sound of Music Live (ITV 2015) Grease: Live (Fox 2016), Hairspray Live! (NBC, 2016), A Christmas Story Live! (Fox, 2017), and Rent: Live (Fox 2019).

Some television shows have set episodes as a musical. Examples include episodes of Ally McBeal, Xena: Warrior Princess ("The Bitter Suite" and "Lyre, Lyre, Heart's On Fire"), Psych ("Psych: The Musical"), Buffy the Vampire Slayer ("Once More, with Feeling"), That's So Raven, Daria, Dexter's Laboratory, The Powerpuff Girls, The Flash, Once Upon a Time, Oz, Scrubs (one episode was written by the creators of Avenue Q), Batman: The Brave and the Bold and That '70s Show (the 100th episode, "That '70s Musical"). Others have included scenes where characters suddenly begin singing and dancing in a musical-theatre style during an episode, such as in several episodes of The Simpsons, 30 Rock, Hannah Montana, South Park, Bob's Burgers and Family Guy. Television series that have extensively used the musical format have included Cop Rock, Flight of the Conchords, Glee, Smash, Eli Stone and Crazy Ex-Girlfriend.

There have also been musicals made for the internet, including Dr. Horrible's Sing-Along Blog, about a low-rent super-villain played by Neil Patrick Harris. It was written during the WGA writer's strike. Since 2006, reality TV shows have been used to help market musical revivals by holding a talent competition to cast (usually female) leads. Examples of these are How Do You Solve a Problem like Maria?, Grease: You're the One That I Want!, Any Dream Will Do, Legally Blonde: The Musical – The Search for Elle Woods, I'd Do Anything and Over the Rainbow. In 2021, Schmigadoon! was a parody of, and homage to, Golden Age musicals of the 1940s and 1950s.

==== 2020–2021 theatre shutdown ====
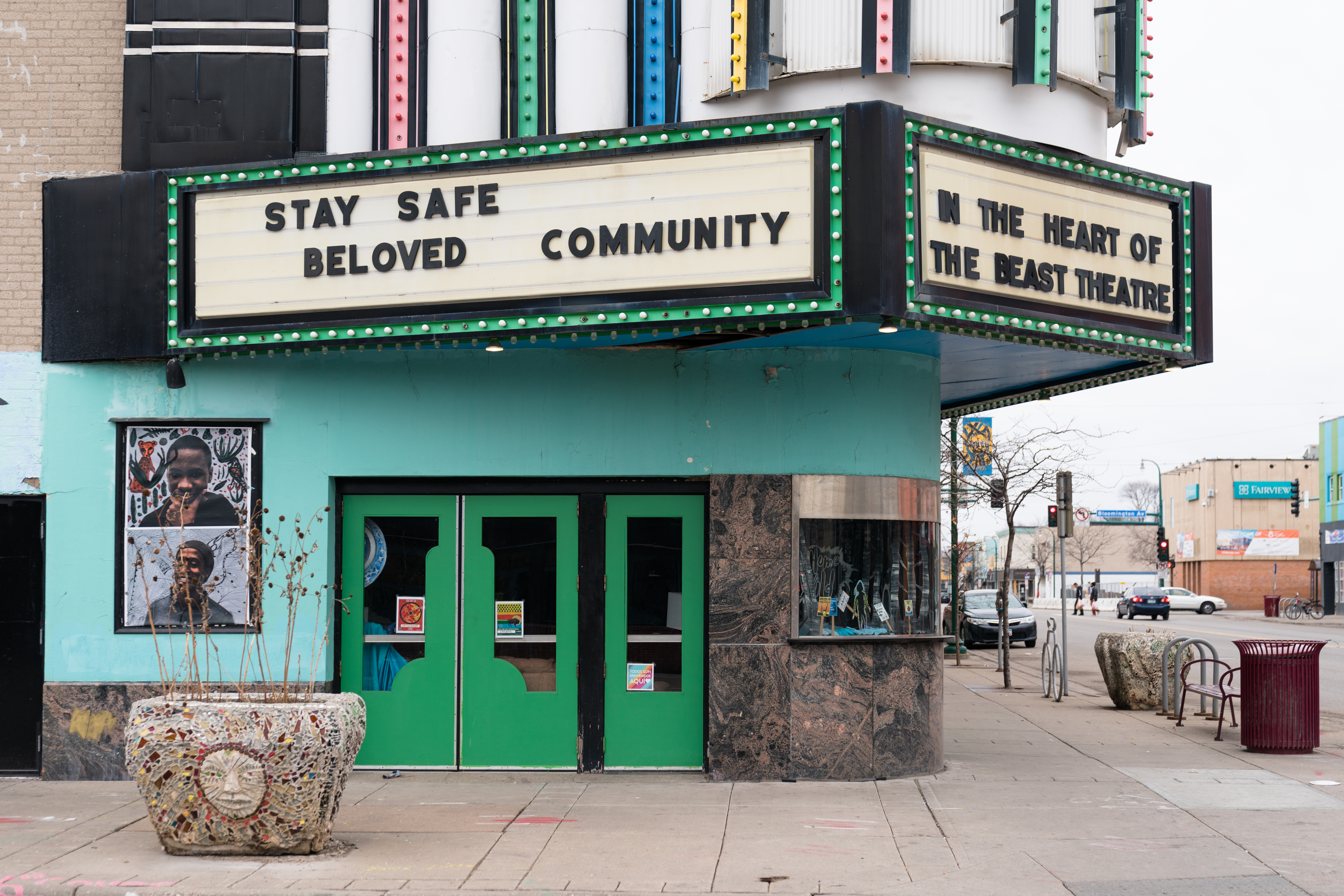
Marquee of the In the Heart of the Beast Theatre in Minneapolis, Minnesota, during the COVID-19 pandemic

The COVID-19 pandemic caused the closure of theatres and theatre festivals around the world in early 2020, including all Broadway and West End theatres. Many performing arts institutions attempted to adapt, or reduce their losses, by offering new (or expanded) digital services. In particular this resulted in the online streaming of previously recorded performances of many companies, as well as bespoke crowdsourcing projects. For example, The Sydney Theatre Company commissioned actors to film themselves at home discussing, then performing, a monologue from one of the characters they had previously played on stage. The casts of musicals, such as Hamilton and Mamma Mia! united on Zoom calls to entertain individuals and the public. Some performances were streamed live, or presented outdoors or in other "socially distanced" ways, sometimes allowing audience members to interact with the cast. Radio theatre festivals were broadcast. Virtual, and even crowd-sourced musicals were created, such as Ratatouille the Musical. Filmed versions of major musicals, like Hamilton, were released on streaming platforms. Andrew Lloyd Webber released recordings of his musicals on YouTube.

Due to the closures and loss of ticket sales, many theatre companies were placed in financial peril. Some governments offered emergency aid to the arts. Some musical theatre markets began to reopen in fits and starts by early 2021, with West End theatres postponing their reopening from June to July, and Broadway starting in September. Throughout 2021, however, spikes in the pandemic caused some closures even after markets reopened.

==== Post-Covid ====
Theatres have struggled for several years since the shutdown; West End and then Broadway audiences and grosses mostly recovered, but regional and local theatres continued to face challenges as costs rose and ticket sales remained low.

== International musicals ==
The U.S. and Britain were the most active sources of book musicals from the 19th century through much of the 20th century (although Europe produced various forms of popular light opera and operetta, for example Spanish Zarzuela, during that period and even earlier). However, the light musical stage in other countries has become more active in recent decades.

Musicals from other English-speaking countries (notably Australia and Canada) often do well locally and occasionally even reach Broadway or the West End (e.g., The Boy from Oz and The Drowsy Chaperone). South Africa has an active musical theatre scene, with revues like African Footprint and Umoja and book musicals, such as Kat and the Kings and Sarafina! touring internationally. Locally, musicals like Vere, Love and Green Onions, Over the Rainbow: the all-new all-gay... extravaganza and Bangbroek Mountain and In Briefs – a queer little Musical have been produced successfully.

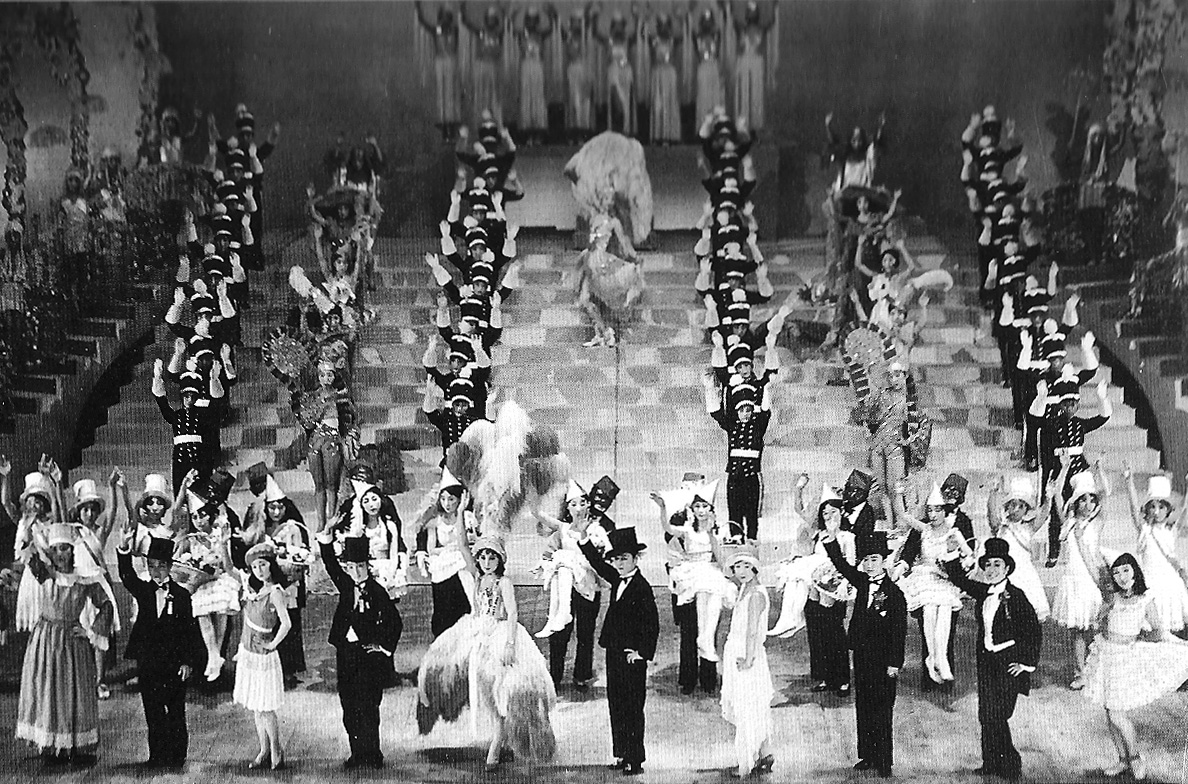
Japan's all-female Takarazuka Revue in a 1930 performance of "Parisette"

Successful musicals from continental Europe include shows from (among other countries) Germany (Elixier and Ludwig II), Austria (Tanz der Vampire, Elisabeth, Mozart! and Rebecca), Czech Republic (Dracula), France (Starmania, Notre-Dame de Paris, Les Misérables, Roméo et Juliette and Mozart, l'opéra rock) and Spain (Hoy no me puedo levantar, El médico and The Musical Sancho Panza).

Japan has recently seen the growth of an indigenous form of musical theatre, both animated and live action, mostly based on Anime and Manga, such as Kiki's Delivery Service and Tenimyu. The popular Sailor Moon metaseries has had twenty-nine Sailor Moon musicals, spanning thirteen years. Beginning in 1914, a series of popular revues have been performed by the all-female Takarazuka Revue, which currently fields five performing troupes. Elsewhere in Asia, the Indian Bollywood musical, mostly in the form of motion pictures, is tremendously successful.

Beginning with a 2002 tour of Les Misérables, various Western musicals have been imported to mainland China and staged in English. Attempts at localizing Western productions in China began in 2008 when Fame was produced in Mandarin with a full Chinese cast at the Central Academy of Drama in Beijing. Since then, other western productions have been staged in China in Mandarin with a Chinese cast. The first Chinese production in the style of Western musical theatre was The Gold Sand in 2005. In addition, Li Dun, a well-known Chinese producer, produced Butterflies, based on a classic Chinese love tragedy, in 2007 as well as Love U Teresa in 2011.

== Amateur and school productions ==
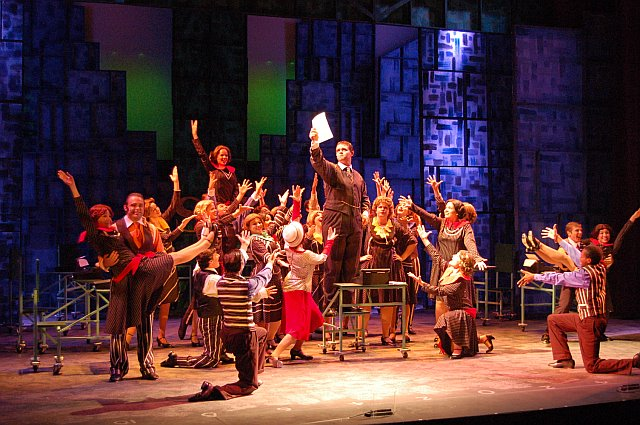
Naples Players' teen Thoroughly Modern Millie, 2009

Musicals are often presented by amateur and school groups in churches, schools and other performance spaces. Although amateur theatre has existed for centuries, even in the New World, François Cellier and Cunningham Bridgeman wrote, in 1914, that prior to the late 19th century, amateur actors were treated with contempt by professionals. After the formation of amateur Gilbert and Sullivan companies licensed to perform the Savoy operas, professionals recognized that the amateur societies "support the culture of music and the drama. They are now accepted as useful training schools for the legitimate stage, and from the volunteer ranks have sprung many present-day favourites." The National Operatic and Dramatic Association was founded in the UK in 1899. It reported, in 1914, that nearly 200 amateur dramatic societies were producing Gilbert and Sullivan works in Britain that year. Similarly, more than 100 amateur theatres were founded in the US in the early 20th century. This number has grown to an estimated 18,000 in the US. The Educational Theater Association in the US has nearly 5,000 member schools.

== Relevance ==
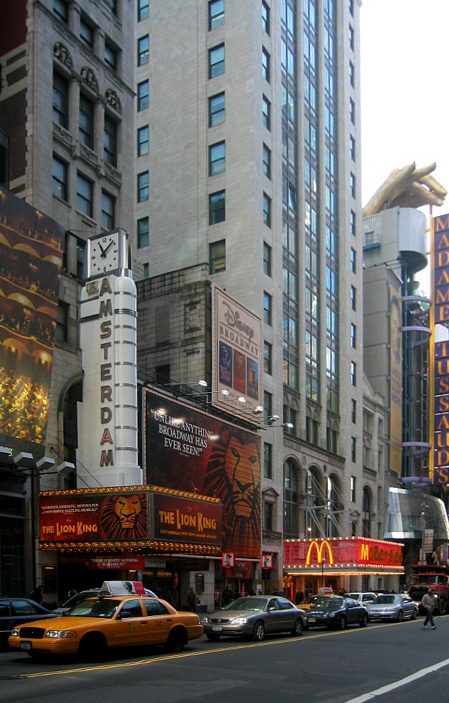
The Lion King on Broadway

The Broadway League announced that in the 2007–08 season, 12.27 million tickets were purchased for Broadway shows for a gross sale amount of almost a billion dollars. The League further reported that during the 2006–07 season, approximately 65% of Broadway tickets were purchased by tourists, and that foreign tourists were 16% of attendees. The Society of London Theatre reported that 2007 set a record for attendance in London. Total attendees in the major commercial and grant-aided theatres in Central London were 13.6 million, and total ticket revenues were £469.7 million. The international musicals scene has been increasingly active in recent decades. Nevertheless, Stephen Sondheim commented in the year 2000:

You have two kinds of shows on Broadway – revivals and the same kind of musicals over and over again, all spectacles. You get your tickets for The Lion King a year in advance, and essentially a family ... pass on to their children the idea that that's what the theater is – a spectacular musical you see once a year, a stage version of a movie. It has nothing to do with theater at all. It has to do with seeing what is familiar. ... I don't think the theatre will die per se, but it's never going to be what it was. ... It's a tourist attraction."

However, noting the success in recent decades of original material, and creative re-imaginings of film, plays and literature, theatre historian John Kenrick countered:

Is the Musical dead? ... Absolutely not! Changing? Always! The musical has been changing ever since Offenbach did his first rewrite in the 1850s. And change is the clearest sign that the musical is still a living, growing genre. Will we ever return to the so-called 'golden age', with musicals at the center of popular culture? Probably not. Public taste has undergone fundamental changes, and the commercial arts can only flow where the paying public allows.

== See also ==
- Cast recording
- Lists of musicals
- List of musicals filmed live on stage
- Long-running musical theatre productions
- Music theatre
- Parsi theatre
- 2.5D musical

== Notes and references ==
=== Cited books ===
- Allain, Paul; Harvie, Jen (2014). The Routledge Companion to Theatre and Performance. Routledge. ISBN 978-0-4156-3631-5.
- Allen, Robert C. (c. 1991). Horrible Prettiness: Burlesque and American Culture. University of North Carolina. ISBN 978-0-8078-1960-9.
- Bradley, Ian (2005). Oh Joy! Oh Rapture! The Enduring Phenomenon of Gilbert and Sullivan. Oxford University Press. ISBN 0-19-516700-7.
- Buelow, George J. (2004). A History of Baroque Music. Bloomington, Indiana: Indiana University Press. ISBN 978-0-253-34365-9.
- Carter, Tim; Butt, John, eds. (2005). The Cambridge History of Seventeenth-Century Music. The Cambridge History of Music. Vol. 1. Cambridge University Press. p. 591. ISBN 978-0-521-79273-8.
- Cohen, Robert; Sherman, Donovan (2020). Theatre: Brief (Twelfth ed.). New York City: McGraw-Hill Education. ISBN 978-1-260-05738-6. OCLC 1073038874.
- Everett, William A.; Laird, Paul R., eds. (2002). The Cambridge Companion to the Musical. Cambridge Companions to Music. Cambridge University Press. ISBN 978-0-521-79189-2.
- Gänzl, Kurt; Andrew Lamb (1988). Gänzl's Book of the Musical Theatre. London: The Bodley Head. OCLC 966051934.
- Gokulsing, K. Moti; Dissanayake, Wimal (2004) [1998]. Indian popular cinema : a narrative of cultural change (Revised and updated ed.). Stoke-on-Trent: Trentham. p. 161. ISBN 978-1-85856-329-9.
- Herbert, Ian, ed. (1972). Who's Who in the Theatre (fifteenth ed.). London: Sir Isaac Pitman and Sons. ISBN 978-0-273-31528-5.
- Hoppin, Richard H., ed. (1978). Anthology of Medieval Music. Norton introduction to music history. New York: Norton. ISBN 978-0-393-09080-2.
- Horn, Barbara Lee (1991). The Age of Hair: Evolution and Impact of Broadway's First Rock Musical. New York: Greenwood Press. p. 166. ISBN 978-0-313-27564-7.
- Jha, Subhash K. (2005). The Essential Guide to Bollywood. Roli Books. ISBN 81-7436-378-5.
- Jones, John B. (2003). Our Musicals, Ourselves. Hanover: University Press of New England. ISBN 978-0-87451-904-4.
- Lord, Suzanne (2003). Brinkman, David (ed.). Music from the Age of Shakespeare : A Cultural History. Westport, Connecticut: Greenwood Press. ISBN 978-0-313-31713-2.
- Lubbock, Mark (2002) [1962]. "American musical theatre: an introduction". The Complete Book of Light Opera (1st ed.). London: Putnam. pp. 753–756.
- Morley, Sheridan (1987). Spread a little happiness: the first hundred years of the British musical. London: Thames and Hudson. ISBN 978-0-500-01398-4.
- Parker, John, ed. (1925). Who's Who in the Theatre (fifth ed.). London: Sir Isaac Pitman and Sons. OCLC 10013159.
- Parker, Roger, ed. (2001). The Oxford Illustrated History of Opera. Oxford Illustrated Histories (illustrated ed.). Oxford University Press. p. 541. ISBN 978-0-19-285445-2.
- Rubin, Don; Solórzano, Carlos, eds. (2000). The World Encyclopedia of Contemporary Theatre: The Americas. New York City: Routledge. ISBN 0-415-05929-1.
- Shakespeare, William (1998) [1623]. Orgel, Stephen (ed.). The Tempest. The Oxford Shakespeare. Oxford University Press. p. 248. ISBN 978-0-19-283414-0.
- Wilmeth, Don B.; Miller, Tice L., eds. (1996). Cambridge Guide to American Theatre (2nd ed.). Cambridge University Press. ISBN 978-0-521-56444-1.
- Wollman, E. L. (2006). The Theater Will Rock: a History of the Rock Musical: From Hair to Hedwig. Michigan: University of Michigan Press. ISBN 0-472-11576-6.
