= Póvoa de Cós =

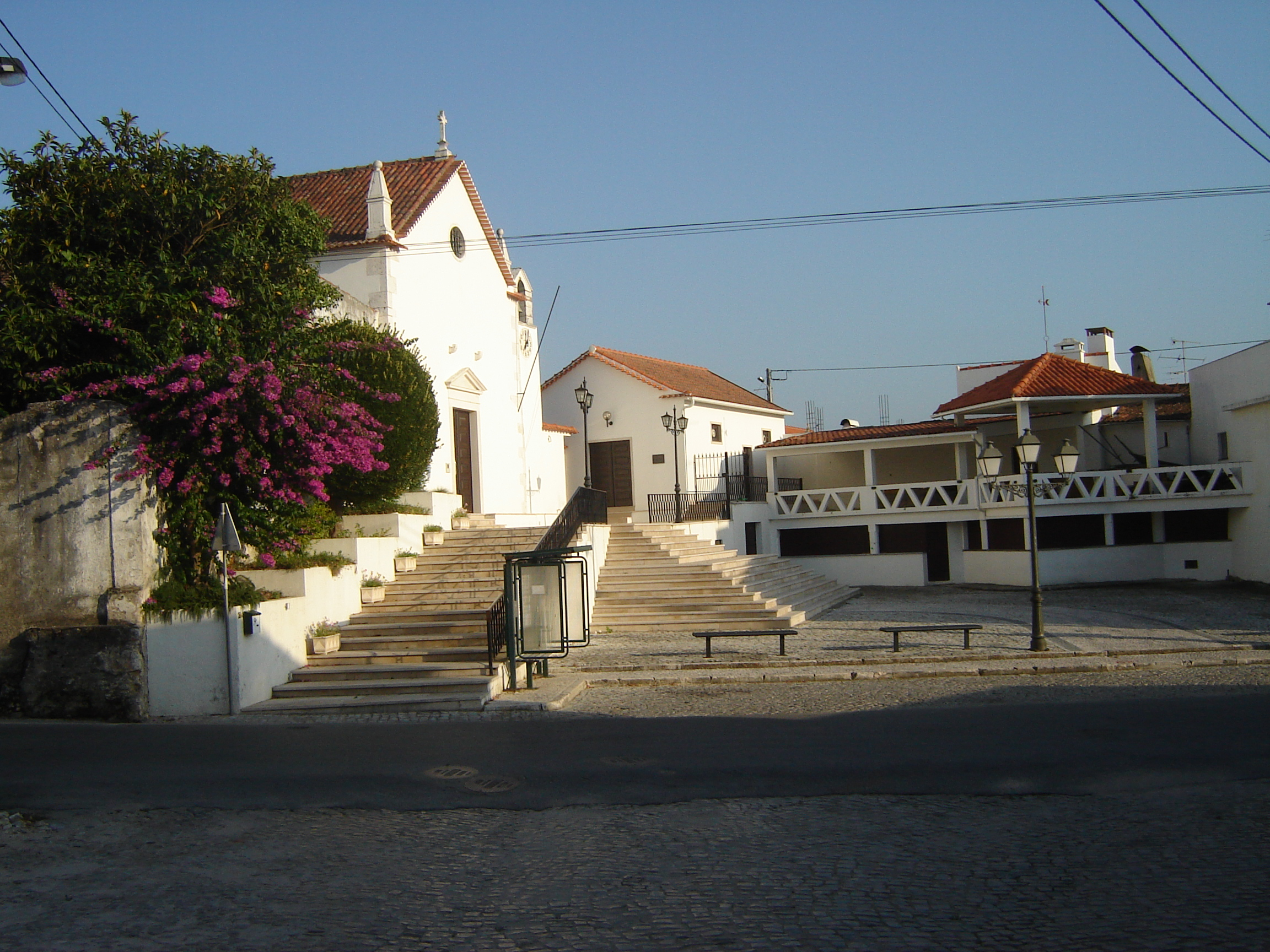
Church on the main square of the village

Póvoa de Cós is a place located in the center of Portugal. It is part of the district of Leiria. Belonging to the county of Alcobaça, it depends on the civil parish of Cós. Significant archaeological discoveries were made there, including a Roman villa which was discovered a Mosaic now exposed in The National Archaeology Museum in Lisbon.

== Other places of the civil parish of Cós ==
Cós, Castanheira, Casal de Areia, Casalinho, Varatojo, Alto Varatojo, Alqueidão, Pomarinho, Casal Resoneiro, Porto Linhares, Vale do Amieiro.
