= El médico =

Spanish musical

El Médico is a Spanish musical based on the 1986 English-language novel The Physician by Noah Gordon, with book and lyrics by Félix Amador, and music by Iván Macías. The story follows Rob J. Cole, a young orphan in 11th-century England, who has the ability to sense death with his hands. Taken in as an apprentice by a traveling barber-surgeon, he journeys across the country, learning the trade and its secrets. At 19, he hears about Avicenna and his renowned medical school in distant Persia. Determined to become a doctor, Rob embarks on an epic journey into the unknown, traveling halfway across the world in pursuit of his dream.

The show officially premiered on October 17, 2018, at the Teatro Nuevo Apolo in Madrid, where it ran for two seasons. Since then, it has toured across Spain and has also been performed in countries including the Czech Republic and Germany.

== Development ==
The idea of adapting Noah Gordon's novel was Iván Macías's idea. He and producer Pablo Martínez contacted Michael Gordon, the son and agent of the author, to propose the project. After listening to some pieces, Gordon organized a meeting with his father in Boston, Massachusetts, in June 2016. The novelist not only granted the rights to develop the show but also became actively involved in the creative process.

== Productions ==
Before its premiere as a fully-staged musical, a symphonic concert version visited some Spanish venues in the 2017–2018 season, directed and choreographed by Michael Ashcroft.

The musical premiered on October 17, 2018, at the Nuevo Apolo Theater in Madrid and was attended by Noah Gordon. He wrote, "the emotion of the novel has managed to transfer to the music so that readers can now experience the adventures of Rob J. Cole in a new and wonderful way". José Luis Sixto directed, with choreography by Francesc Abós, set design by Alfons Flores, costume design by Lorenzo Caprile, lighting design by Luis Perdiguero, sound design by Olly Steel, special effects by Jorge Blass, and musical direction by Iván Macías. After two seasons, El médico closed in Madrid on January 12, 2020. A planned 2020 a national tour was cancelled due to the COVID-19 pandemic.

Beon Entertainment produced a tour of the main Spanish cities directed by Ignasi Vidal, with choreography by Amaya Galeote, set design by Josep Simón and Eduardo Díaz, costume design by Lorenzo Caprile, lighting design by Felipe Ramos, sound design by Alejandro Martín. It premiered on December 22, 2021, at the Cartuja Center in Seville and toured until February 26, 2023, closing at the Teatro Principal in Zaragoza. The cast was led by Guido Balzaretti as Rob J. Cole, Cristina Picos as Mary Cullen, Joseán Moreno as Barber, Enrique Ferrer as Sha and Alberto Vázquez as Avicenna.

From October 29, 2024, to March 2, 2025, the Beon Entertainment production ran at the Teatre Apolo in Barcelona with a cast led by Federico Salles as Rob J. Cole, Alba Cuartero as Mary Cullen, Joseán Moreno as Barber, Paco Arrojo as Sha, and Sergi Albert as Avicenna, before embarking on another tour across Spain.

== Musical numbers ==
Act I

- Prólogo: El diablo en Londres
- El barbero ya llegó
- Para hacerte mayor
- El viaje
- Hoy por fin
- El barbero ya llegó (Reprise) ^{*}
- Hoy partiré
- La caravana
- Ai-di-di-di-dai
- Escrito en las estrellas
- Isfahán
- Final del primer acto

Act II

- Canción de los estudiantes
- Aria del Sha
- Lejos de ti
- Los cuatro amigos
- Shalom
- En la tormenta (Canción de Mary)
- Hoy por fin (Reprise) ^{*}
- Soñaba
- Final (La ciudad gris)

* Song not included on the original cast album

== Casts ==
Character	Symphonic concert	Madrid	Tour	Barcelona	Tour
Character	2017	2018	2021	2024	2025
Rob J. Cole	Adrián Salzedo	Adrián Salzedo	Guido Balzaretti	Federico Salles	Federico Salles
Mary Cullen	Talía del Val	Sofia Escobar	Cristina Picos	Alba Cuartero	Alba Cuartero
Barber	Joseán Moreno	Joseán Moreno	Joseán Moreno	Joseán Moreno	Joseán Moreno
Sha	Alain Damas	Alain Damas	Enrique Ferrer	Paco Arrojo	Paco Arrojo
Avicena	Ricardo Truchado	Ricardo Truchado	Alberto Vázquez	Sergi Albert	Sergi Albert
Agnes	Angels Jiménez	Noemí Mazoy	Irene Barrios	María Jaraiz	María Jaraiz
Mirdin	Alberto Aliaga	Raúl Ortiz	Daniel Galán	Laureano Ramírez	Laureano Ramírez
Karim	Juan Delgado	Juan Delgado	Jordi Garreta	Adrián de Vicente	Adrián de Vicente
Fritta	Héctor Otones	Álvaro Puertas	Jordi Garreta	Miguel Ferrer	Miguel Ferrer
Qandrasseh	Beltrán Iraburu	Beltrán Iraburu	Miquel Mars	Fernando Samper	Fernando Samper
Merlin	Javier Navares	Fernando Samper	Miquel Mars	Fernando Samper	Fernando Samper
Meir	Raúl Ortiz	Alberto Aliaga	Fran León	Franc de Luna	Franc de Luna
Young Rob J. Cole	Victoria Galán	Victoria Galán; Diego Poch; Paula González; Noelia Rincón	Beatriz de Teresa	Beatriz de Teresa	Beatriz de Teresa

== Cast recording ==
In July 2018, part of the team of El médico traveled to the AIR Studios in London to record the musical's album with the London Symphony Orchestra. The double disc, which was produced by Kevin Killen, includes virtually the entire score, leaving out only a few brief excerpts. Several of the voices that can be heard on the album were performers who had participated in the symphony concert but who were not in the cast that premiered the show in Madrid.

== Awards ==
Year	Award	Category	Nominee	Result
2019	Premio Max	Best Musical		Nominated
