= Paul Laird =

American musicologist

Paul Robert Laird (born October 26, 1958) is an American musicologist at the University of Kansas born in Louisville, Kentucky.

== Education ==
Raised in Bridgewater Township, New Jersey, Laird graduated in 1976 from Bridgewater-Raritan High School East, where he participated in the New Jersey All-State Orchestra.

Laird holds a Ph.D. in music from the University of North Carolina at Chapel Hill. His research interests include the Spanish and Latin American villancico, Leonard Bernstein, the Broadway musical, and Baroque cello. He has taught at Pennsylvania State University, Binghamton University and the University of Denver. Reviewer Alvaro Torrente described Laird's book Towards a History of the Spanish Villancico as "a milestone in the study of the villancico."

== Publications ==
He directs the Instrumental Collegium Musicum and is active as a Baroque cellist, performing with the Spencer Consort. In August 2002, he won a University of Kansas W. T. Kemper Fellowship for Teaching Excellence.

His 2004 book The Baroque Cello Revival: An Oral History features interviews with more than 40 cellists and instrument makers. His current project include two studies of the musical theater of Stephen Schwartz and the publication of the orchestral score of the Broadway show Gypsy.

Laird was the director of the Division of Musicology at the University of Kansas from 2000 until 2009. He has taught at the University of Kansas since 1994 and has taught four courses on music research in Ecuador for the Universidad de Cuenca.

== Publications ==
- Towards a History of the Spanish Villancico (Harmonie Park Press, 1997)
- Leonard Bernstein: A Guide to Research (Routledge, 2002)
- The Baroque Cello Revival: An Oral History (Scarecrow Press, 2004)
- Res musicae: Essays in Honor of James W. Pruett (Harmonie Park Press, 2001; co-editor)
- Historical Dictionary of the Broadway Musical (Scarecrow Press, 2007)
- On Bunker's Hill: Essays in Honor of J. Bunker Clark (Harmonie Park Press, 2007)
- The Cambridge Companion to the Musical (Cambridge University Press, 2002; co-editor with William A. Everett, second edition, 2008)
- Leonard Bernstein's Chichester Psalms (Pendragon Press, 2010)
- WICKED: A Musical Biography (Scarecrow Press, 2011)

== Other literary works ==
Laird has contributed to:

- The New Grove Dictionary of Music and Musicians (2nd ed.)
- Anuario musical
- Nassarre
- Revista de Musicología
- Early Music
- Australian Journal of Musicology
- CMS Symposium
- MLA Notes
- Historical Performance
- American Music
- American Record Guide
- Continuo Magazine
