= Sofia Escobar =

Portuguese soprano singer and actress

- Born: Sofia Alexandra Cepa Escobar Ferreira da Silva; 29 November 1984 (age 41); Guimarães, Portugal
- Education: Conservatório de Música do Porto
- Occupations: Actress and singer
- Years active: 2003–present
- Spouse: Gonzalo Ramos (m. 2013)

Sofia Alexandra Cepa Escobar Ferreira da Silva (born 29 November 1984) is a Portuguese soprano singer and actress. She is best known for being part of the cast in West End musicals, in London. She performed the role of Maria in West Side Story. Her most acclaimed role was Christine Daaé, the lead character in Andrew Lloyd Webber's Phantom of the Opera.

== Early life ==
Sofia Alexandra Cepa Escobar Ferreira da Silva was born on 29 November 1984 in Guimarães, Portugal.

She studied at Conservatório de Música do Porto in Porto, Portugal, and continued her studies at the Guildhall School of Music and Drama.

She had a scholarship that paid for her tuition. Her parents could not afford her studies in London, and took out a mortgage on their house to pay for her studies. Sofía worked as a waitress in a restaurant near the school after classes for 5 pounds an hour, until 2 am.

== Career ==
=== Television ===
She was on the Portuguese TV series Morangos com Açúcar in 2003, as Professor Olívia Matos for 42 episodes. In 2009 Escobar was a judge on the Portuguese TV show Quem é o Melhor?.

Between 2015 and 2016, she was a jury member on Got Talent Portugal.

=== Theatre ===
Escobar's first experience in the West End musicals was with The Phantom of the Opera, after having been the lead understudy actress in 2007 and 2008.

She played the lead Hanna Gzelak character in the Portuguese musical Scents of Light.

She performed in the West Side Story at Sadler's Wells, playing the role of Maria.

From 2010 to 2013 she played the role of Christine Daaé, the leading character in The Phantom of the Opera at Her Majesty's Theatre in Haymarket, London. She is one very few non-native English speakers to have portrayed Daaé in an English-language production.

In 2016 she was part of the cast in the new Portuguese musical Eusébio, a tribute to the Portuguese footballer, that made it to the stage on April 6. She subsequently was in the play Entre o Céu e a Terra.

In 2018 she played Mary Cullen in El médico.

=== Music ===
On 6 October 2012 she performed a duet with Spanish tenor José Carreras in her hometown, invited by him.

== Personal life ==
On 21 September 2013, she married the Spanish actor, Gonzalo Ramos in an intimate ceremony in Guimarães, Portugal. On 6 March 2014, she gave birth to the couple's first child, a boy, whom they called Gabriel Ramos Escobar.

== Awards and nominations ==
Escobar won the Best Actress in a Musical award at the Whatsonstage Theatregoer's Choice Awards for her performance as Maria in West Side Story. She was also nominated for the Laurence Olivier Award for Best Actress in a Musical at the 2009 Laurence Olivier Awards for the same role.

She received a Portuguese Golden Globe nomination for Revelation of the Year 2010, where she sang "Think of Me" from The Phantom of the Opera.
