= Rui Massena =

Portuguese conductor

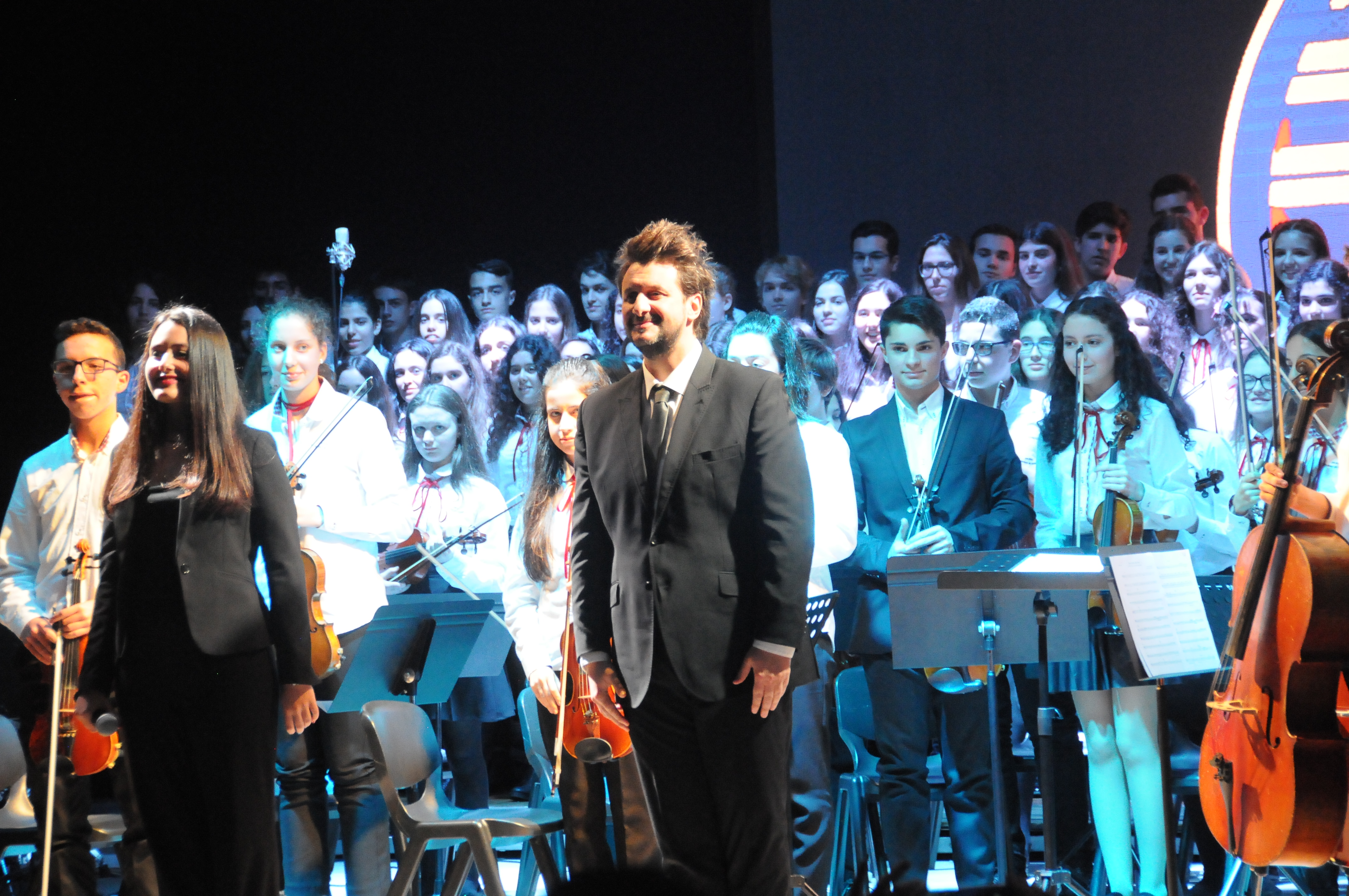
Rui Massena in Colégio Dom Diogo de Sousa, Braga, Portugal, 2017

Rui Manuel Massena da Silva Pereira (born 26 December 1972) is a Portuguese conductor, composer and pianist. He has also worked on television.

== Life and career ==
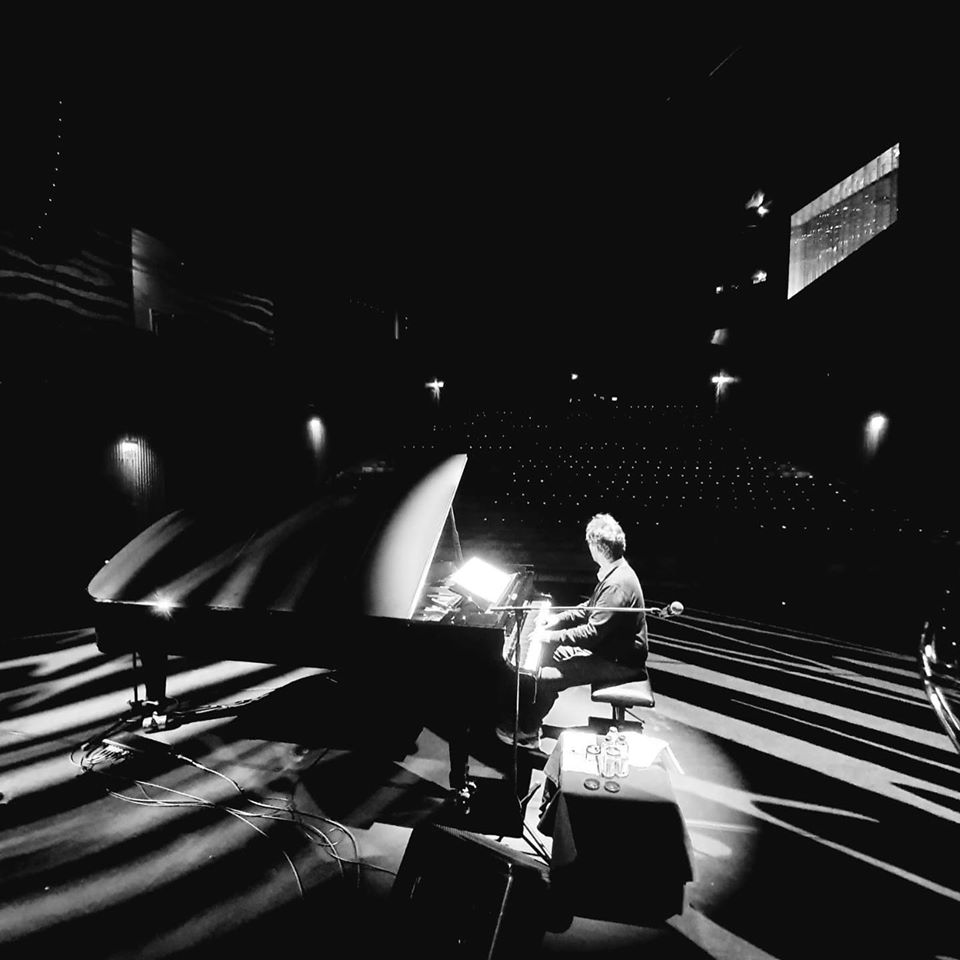
Rui Massena at a concert in Casa da Musica concert hall, Porto, 2019

Rui Massena was born on 26 December 1972 in Vila Nova de Gaia, Porto District, Portugal. His maternal grandfather played the Coimbra guitar, his mother sang and his father played the piano. In his musical education Rui Massena learned to play the piano and the violin, studied at the Vilar de Paraíso Academy and graduated in Orchestra Conducting in the class of conductor Jean-Marc Burfin at the National Superior Academy of Orchestra in Lisbon. After completing his degree, he perfected his training in Italy with Gianluigi Gelmetti and in France with Cristhian Manem. He also studied with Robert Delecroix, Pascal Rophé and Jean Sébestian Béreau. He studied piano with Hugo Berto Coelho, Teresa Monteiro, Maria José Morais and violin with Bogumila Burfin. Since 2000, Rui Massena, the artistic name by which he is known, has been artistic director and titular maestro of the Orquestra Clássica da Madeira, in Funchal; and since 2005 he has been the pedagogic director of the Conservatório Escola Profissional das Artes da Madeira (CEPAM) and artistic director of the International Competition Madeira Music.

In 2007, Massena performed as a conductor at Carnegie Hall, one of New York's most prestigious venues, in a performance with the New England Symphonic Ensemble. He has adapted various symphonic and other musical styles, fused symphonic music with the music of Da Weasel, Rui Veloso and Ala dos Namorados, he has also composed for theatre, especially for musicals. His published work includes five CDs with Mozart pieces for EMI Classics and several recordings and other works for RTP, RDP, TVI, Austria Rundfunk, RAI 1 and Mexican Television. He had a participation as guest conductor for the Presidency of the Portuguese Republic in the commemorative concert for Portugal Day, celebrated on June 10, 2008; and conducting in concerts of José Carreras, José Cura, Mark Zeltser, Eva Maria Zuk and Svetla Vassileva.

== Personal life ==
Rui Massena lives in Porto and is married to Clara, a physician, with whom he has children. The French Marshal André Masséna who during the Peninsular War was appointed by Napoleon as Commander of the Army of Portugal in 1810 after the French Invasion of Portugal, is his ancestor.
