= António Casalinho =

Portuguese dancer

- Born: António Casalinho; June 14, 2003 (age 23); Leiria, Portugal
- Occupation: Dancer
- Years active: 2011–present
- Known for: Youth America Grand Prix, Got Talent Portugal, A Batalha dos Jurados
- Dancing career
- Current group: the Vienna State Ballet
- Former groups: the Bavarian State Ballet
- Website: http://antoniocasalinho.com

António Casalinho (born June 14, 2003) is a Portuguese ballet dancer. He has been a principal dancer with the Bavarian State Ballet, and currently is a principal dancer at the Vienna State Ballet.

== Early life ==
Casalinho won the Youth America Grand Prix prize for his age category. In April 2017 he won the 3rd edition of the Portuguese TV show Got Talent Portugal getting a golden buzzer on every act he made. On July 26, 2020, António Casalinho won the 1st edition of A Batalha dos Jurados, on RTP 1. In July 2018 he won the gold medal at the 2018 Varna International Ballet Competition on the juniors age category.

== Career ==
In 2021, Casalinho won the Prix de Lausanne. He joined the Bayerisches Staatsballett in 2021/22 season and was promoted as First Soloist in 2023. On November 29, 2024, he was promoted to Principal Dancer.
