= Billy Waters (busker) =

Beggar, actor and musician (c. 1778–1823)

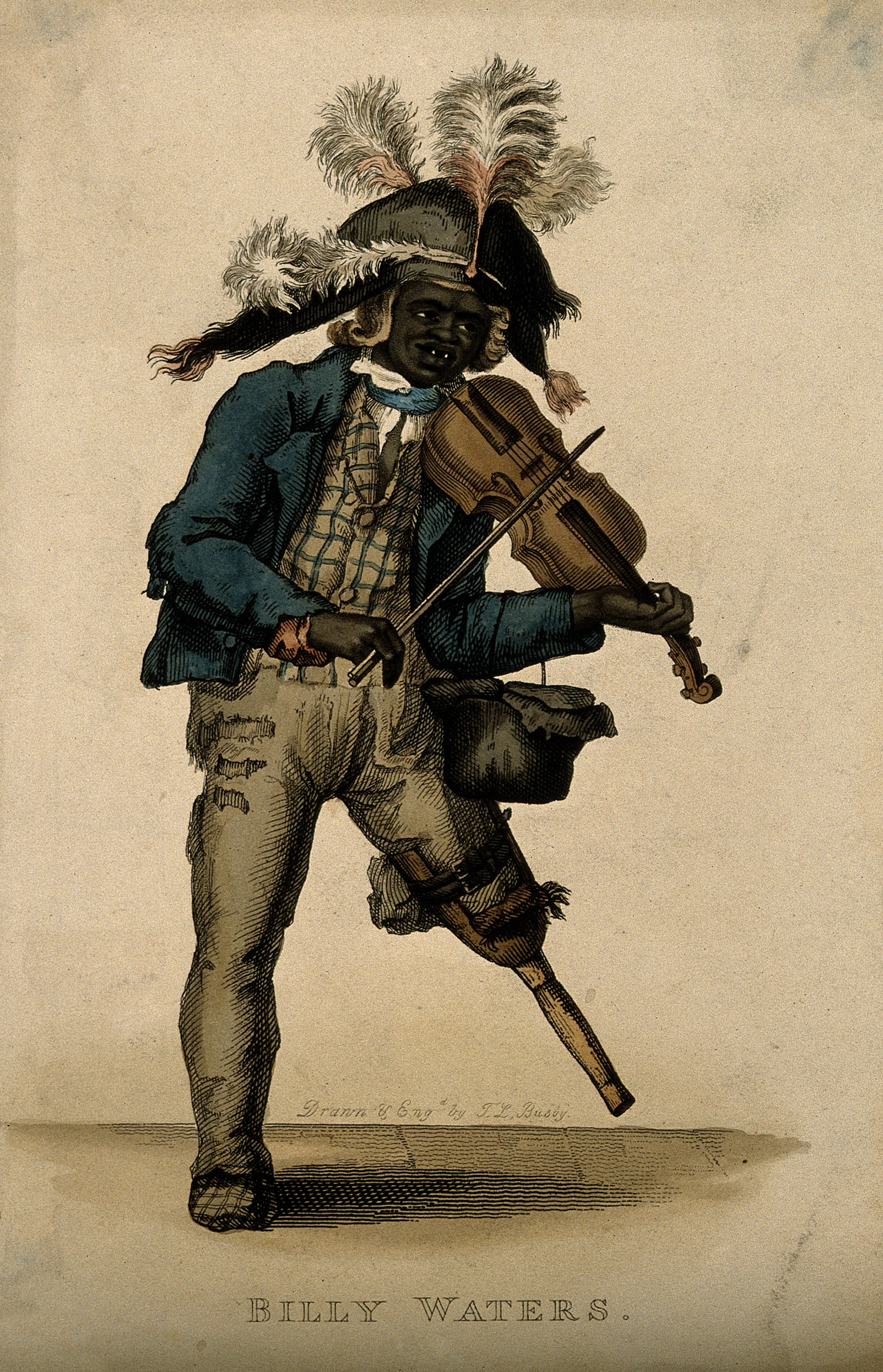
- Waters by Thomas Lord Busby
- Born: c. 1778 New York
- Died: 1823 (aged 44–45); St Giles Workhouse, London
- Occupations: Beggar, performer

Billy Waters (c. 1778–1823) was a black man who busked in London in the nineteenth century by singing, playing the violin and entertaining theatre goers with his "peculiar antics". He became famous when he appeared as a character in William Thomas Moncrieff's Tom and Jerry, or Life in London in 1821.

== Biography ==
Billy Waters became notable as a beggar on the streets of London where he played the violin to entertain theatre-goers in exchange for halfpennies. It is said that he was formerly enslaved in America but that he traded his servitude to be a British sailor. His striking image was established by his African ancestry, a naval uniform, his peg leg, his violin and the addition of a feathered hat. Waters had lost his leg as a sailor in the navy when he fell from the rigging. He had a wife and two children to support, and in the 1810s and 1820s he would busk outside the Adelphi Theatre. Waters and his "peculiar antics" became so famous that he was asked to appear on stage as himself.

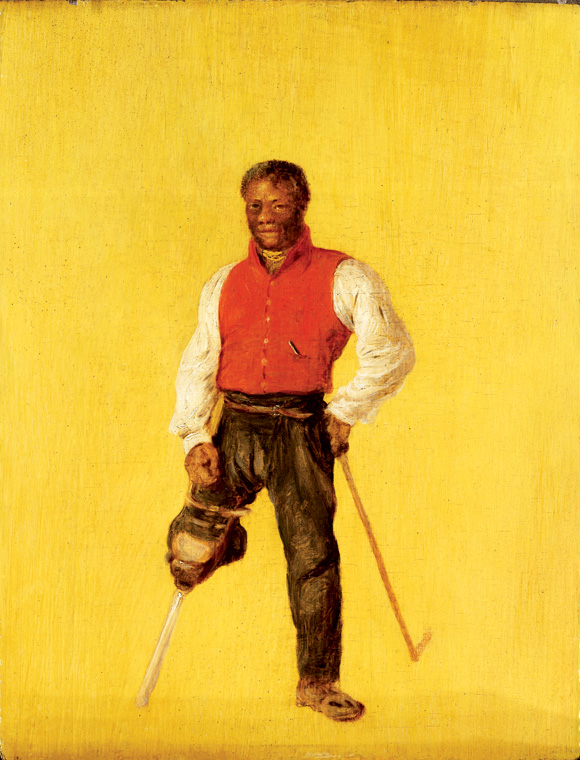
Waters, c. 1815, attributed to Sir David Wilkie

Waters was one of the London characters depicted in William Thomas Moncrieff's Tom and Jerry, or Life in London, an unauthorised stage adaptation of Pierce Egan's Life in London, or Days and Nights of Jerry Hawthorne and his elegant friend Corinthian Tom, in 1821. Waters was one of the estimated 10,000 people of African heritage who were making a living at this time in England. He was very poor and it is said that he was twice saved from the punishment of the treadmill due to his peg leg.

At the end of his life, Waters was popularly elected as the "King of the Beggars" in the parish of St Giles because of his fame and the regard of his peers. His small naval pension had left him so poor that he had to sell his violin and it was said that he would have also sold his wooden leg but it was worthless with wear. Waters became ill and had to enter the St Giles' workhouse where he died in 1823 after ten days.

Billy Waters' will was in verse and one section read:

Thus poor Black Billy's made his Will,
His Property was small good lack,
For till the day death did him kill
His house he carried on his back.
The Adelphi now may say alas!
And to his memory raise a stone:
Their gold will be exchanged for brass,
Since poor Black Billy's dead and gone.

== Legacy ==
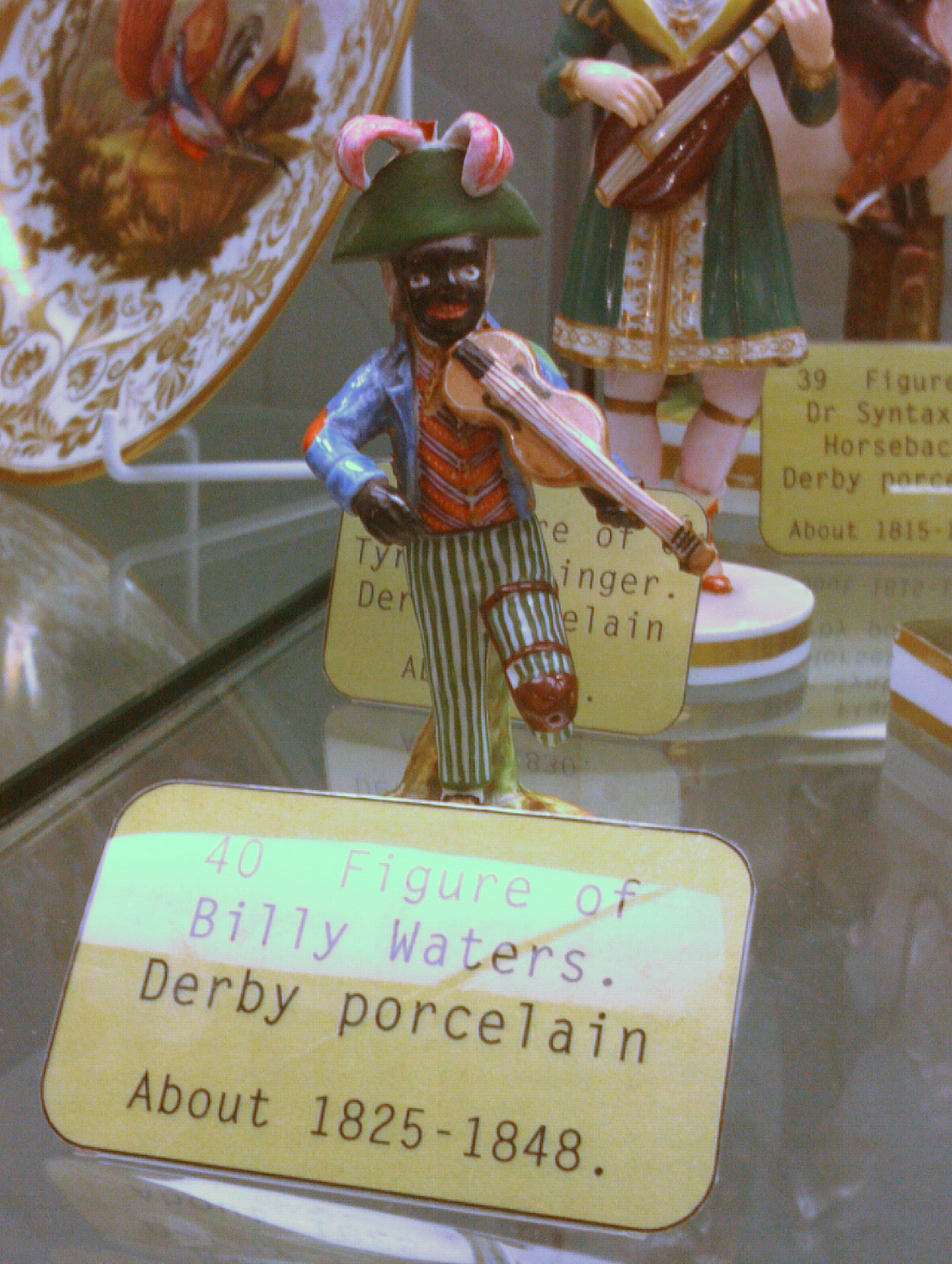
Waters in Derby Porcelain – dated 1825–1848 and now in Derby Museum

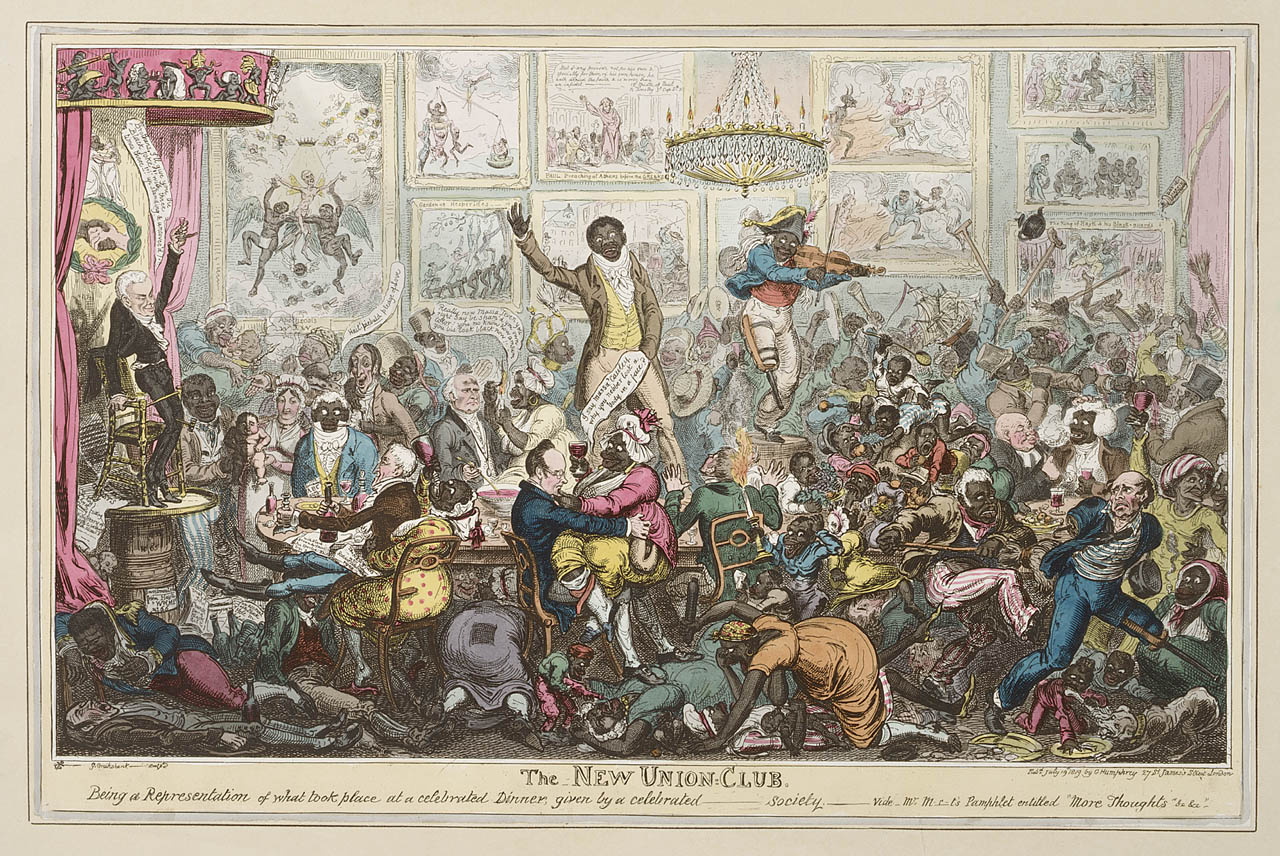
An illustration of Billy Waters entertaining "at a celebrated Dinner"

After his death, his figure was recreated in porcelain – notably by the Staffordshire potteries, but also by Derby porcelain. The figure shown is also in the Victoria and Albert Museum and this re-issue has been dated to 1862. These figures were made in Derby nearly forty years after Waters' death at the Derby factory of Stevenson & Hancock. The modelling by Edward Keys was an attempt to win away trade from cheaper Staffordshire ceramic figures. There is a sketch of Waters by Thomas Lord Busby which comes from his book Costume of the Lower Orders of London. A more realistic painting is attributed to Sir David Wilkie.

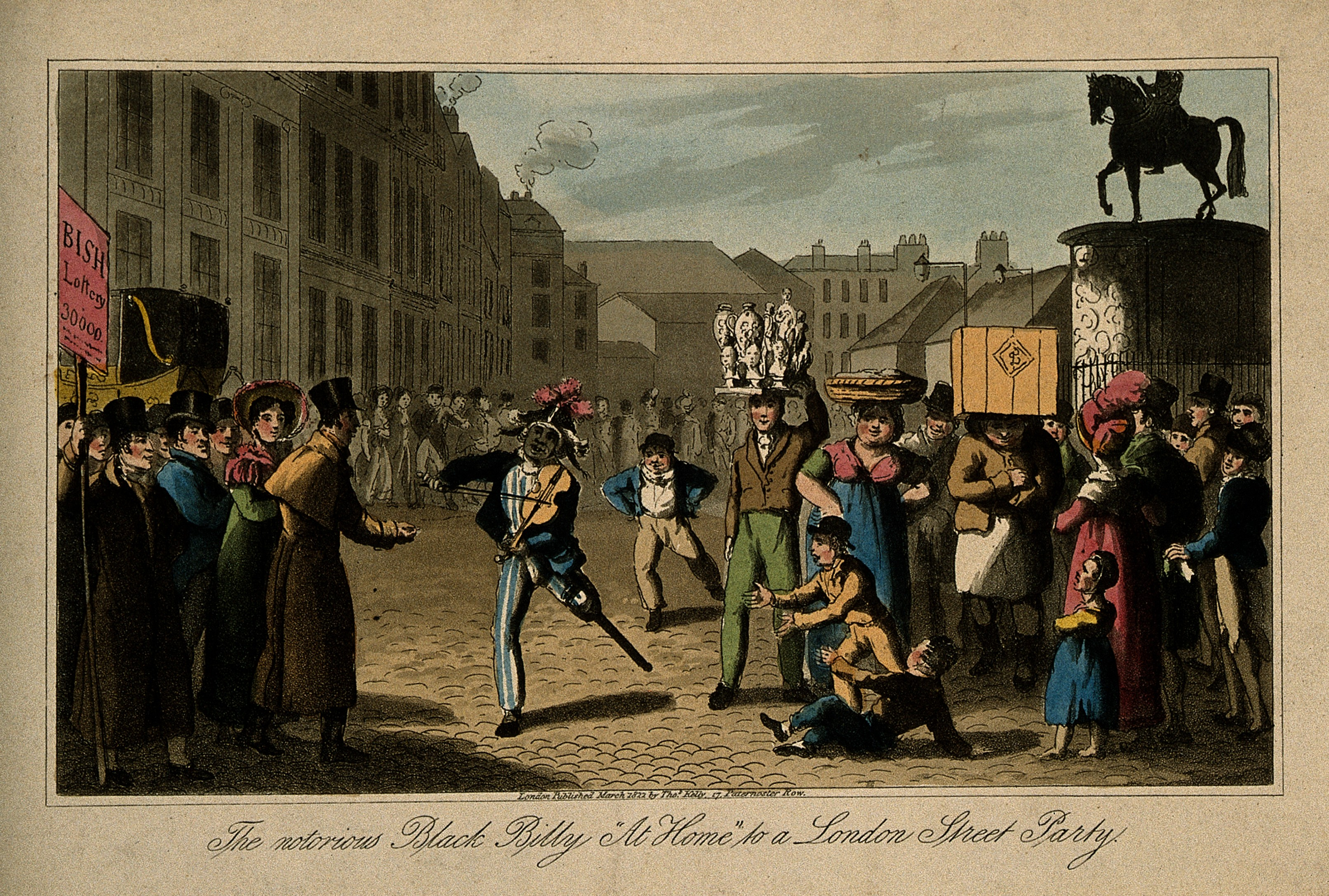
Billy Waters busking

The pottery figure, however, is similar to the print by Thomas Lord Busby in showing that Waters' left leg is the one that was amputated, as well as in the "Billy Waters busking" aquatint. This is in contrast to the engraving done by George Cruikshank in 1819 where Waters is shown providing entertainment for a fictional "celebrated dinner" of those involved in Anti-Slavery. Several notable abolitionists are lampooned in this engraving. The Cruishank engraving shows Billy Waters with a missing right leg, as shown in the Sir David Wilkie portrait. It has been argued that the printing process may reverse the image, but Billy Waters is clearly holding the body of his violin in his left arm, which would be correct for a right-handed person. Waters is shown holding his violin with his left arm in the Cruikshank engraving.
