= Long runs on the London stage since 1700 =

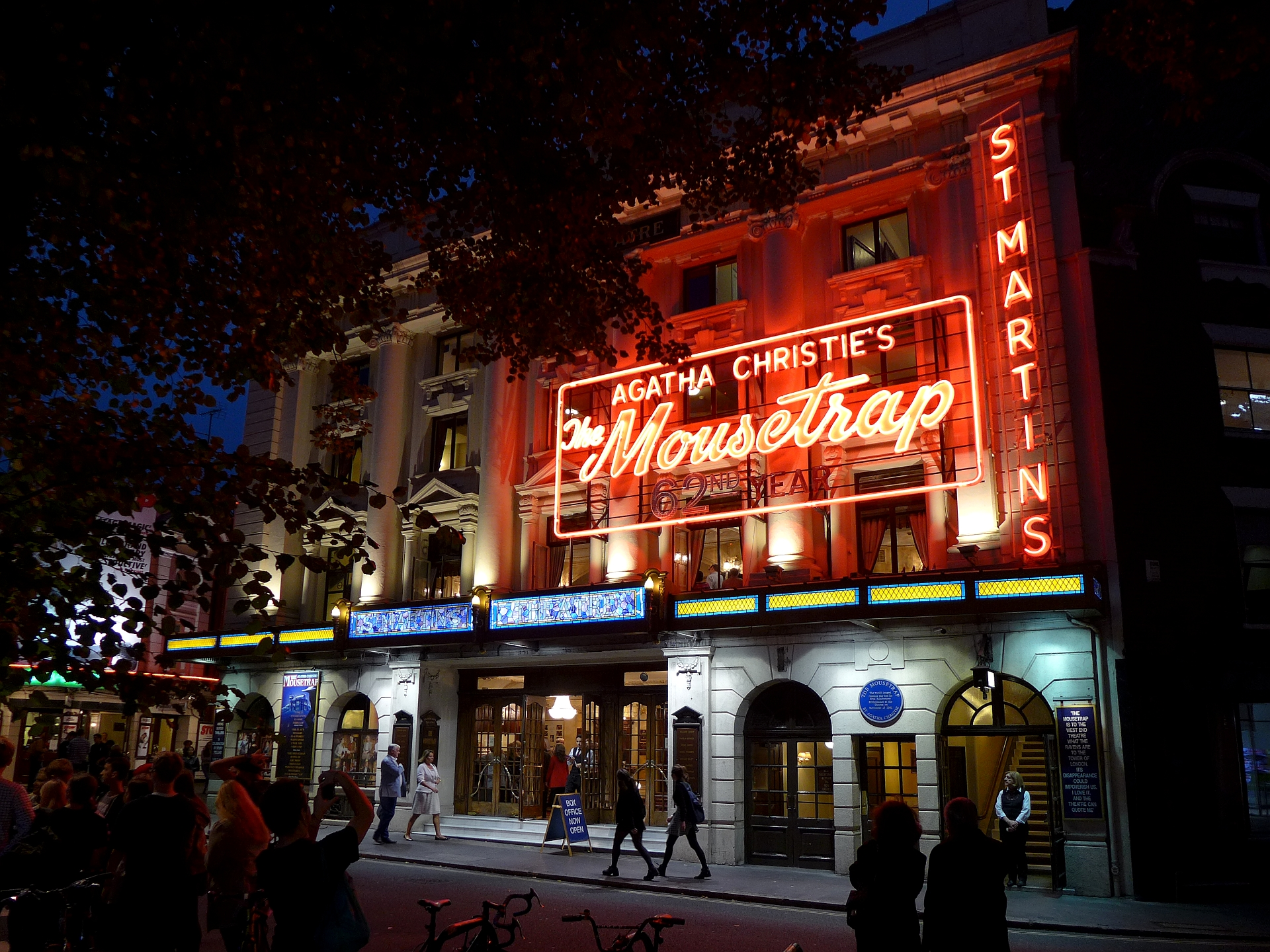
The Mousetrap at the St Martin's Theatre: London's – and the world's – longest-running play: 28,152 performances by 2020

Runs of several thousand performances were familiar in West End theatres in the 21st century. The closure of London theatres in the COVID-19 pandemic halted the continuous runs of eight shows that had been running for more than 4,000 performances. Such long runs were a phenomenon not seen before the late 20th century: in earlier years, much shorter runs were the norm, even for shows considered great successes.

The ballad opera The Beggar's Opera ran for 62 performances in 1728, and held the record for London's longest run for nearly a century. Another musical show, Tom and Jerry, or Life in London (1821), was the first production to reach 100 consecutive performances.

In the second half of the 19th century longer runs became familiar. The 1860s saw the first production to reach 300 performances, and in the 1870s came the first runs in excess of 1,000. Among them was the farce Charley's Aunt, which ran for 1,466 performances, a record that remained unbroken for 25 years. The upward trend continued in the 20th century. The first show to reach 2,000 performances was Chu Chin Chow which opened in 1916. It held the record for London's longest run until 1958.

By far the West End's longest run is that of the murder mystery The Mousetrap, by Agatha Christie. It opened in 1952 and by 1958 was the longest-running stage work seen in London; it was still running in 2020 when the theatres closed and was the first West End production to reopen. Its record of more than 28,000 continuous performances has not been rivalled by any other production. London's second-longest-running show, and longest-running musical, Les Misérables, has run for more than 14,000 performances since 1985.

== 18th and 19th centuries ==
Until 1822 no play ran in London for 100 performances. Among the reasons for this advanced by the theatre historian John Parker are that matinée performances, which typically take a show's weekly total performances from six to eight, were scarcely known, and that much of London's theatre was provided by the Patent theatres – the Theatre Royal, Drury Lane, the Theatre Royal, Covent Garden (now the Royal Opera House), and the Haymarket Theatre, which were licensed to present spoken drama. Enterprising managers found ways round the law and presented spoken plays in other London venues from time to time, but for the most part, drama was confined to the three authorised theatres. Drury Lane and Covent Garden had eight-month seasons, from October to July; the Haymarket operated during the four months when the other two were closed. All three relied mostly on Shakespeare and other classic dramatists. The familiarity of the repertoire necessitated frequent changes of programmes to attract the public.

Advertisement for a performance in the first run of The Beggar's Opera, 1828

The first stage work to obtain a run of more than fifty nights, was a musical production, The Beggar's Opera by John Gay, at Lincoln's Inn Fields Theatre, first given in January 1728, and performed 62 times successively. (Note: The work was not given every night – the theatre was used on some nights for one-off benefit performances – and the run of 62 performances took from late January to mid-June to complete. This was London's longest run at the time but only the second longest anywhere: Robert Cambert's opera Pomone ran in Paris for 146 performances in 1671.) King George II and Queen Caroline went to see a performance on 7 February. A press reporter wrote on 13 June:

Last Night the Beggars Opera was acted the 60th Time, at the Theatre in Lincoln's Inn-fields. And 'tis remarkable that the People crowded in with as much eagerness as ever they did from the Time of its being first acted.

Watkins Burroughs in Tom and Jerry, 1821

The first production to run for 100 consecutive performances in London was Tom and Jerry, or Life in London, an adaptation by W. T. Moncrieff of Pierce Egan's prodigiously successful novel Life in London. It opened at the Adelphi Theatre in November 1821 and completed its run of 100 performance on 30 March 1822. Its record stood for five years: a nautical melodrama by W. Bayle Bernard called Casco Bay, produced at the Olympic Theatre in December 1827, was played 140 times. Despite its initial success the piece does not appear to have been revived after the initial run.

The play that surpassed the record of Casco Bay – Douglas Jerrold's comedy Black-Eyed Susan – had its first run at the Surrey Theatre, starring Thomas Cooke, from June 1829. After the 84th night the theatre announced:

In consequence of the still increasing desire of the Public to witness Black-Eyed Susan, Mr T. P. Cooke has consented to give up all his Engagements, and will remain at this theatre during the unprecedented and extraordinary attraction of that popular Nautical Drama.

The run was extended to 150 performances; there followed numerous revivals in London and the provinces. Black-Eyed Susan's record was broken four years later by Edward Fitzball's Jonathan Bradford, or The Murder at the Road-Side Inn, a melodrama at the Surrey, in June 1833. It was performed 161 times in succession, and was revived several times, over many years.

=== 1840s and 1850s ===
In 1843, with the passing of the Theatres Act, new theatres were permitted to present spoken drama, with the result that more new plays were presented. Although it was another 18 years before Jonathan Bradford's record was broken, longer runs were becoming more frequent. In London (and Parisian) theatres of the mid-19th century a run of 100 performances was seen as the touchstone of success. In the 1840s and 1850s eight new plays and one revival achieved what Parker calls "the coveted 100 nights" in London:

| Production | Genre | Theatre | Opened | Performances |
|---|---|---|---|---|
| The War in China | Naval and military spectacle | Astley's Amphitheatre | 1844 | 114 |
| Martin Chuzzlewit | Adaptation of Dickens's novel | Lyceum | 1844 | 105 |
| The Island of Jewels | Extravaganza | Lyceum | 1849 | 111 |
| The Court Beauties | Comedy | Lyceum | 1851 | 104 |
| King Charming | Extravaganza | Lyceum | 1851 | 109 |
| Uncle Tom's Cabin | Adaptation of Harriet Beecher-Stowe's novel | Victoria | 1852 | 111 |
| The Chase | Equestrian drama | Astley's | 1853 | 104 |
| The Battle of Waterloo | Revival of military spectacle | Astley's | 1853 | 110 |
| The Camp at Chobham | Farce | Adelphi | 1853 | 143 |

The first Shakespeare play to run for 100 nights was Charles Kean's production of King Henry VIII at the Princess's Theatre, with Walter Lacy as the King, Ellen Kean as Queen Katherine and Kean as Cardinal Wolsey. It ran from 16 May 1855 to the end of the season on 14 September. (It opened the next season on 22 October and ran for a further 50 nights).

=== 1860s ===
The Colleen Bawn

In Parker's view, modern long runs may be said to have begun with the production of Dion Boucicault's melodrama, The Colleen Bawn, given at the Adelphi on 10 September 1860. It played for 165 successive nights in its first run, and for a further 249 performances when revived in 1861 and 1862.

The first play to run for more than 300 consecutive performances was Peep o' Day by Edmund Falconer, adapted from a novel by John Banim. It was a melodrama, in which, according to The Morning Post, "everybody betrays everybody else"; it was produced at the Lyceum on 9 November 1861, starring Hermann Vezin, and ran for 346 nights. Two days after Falconer's play opened, Our American Cousin by Tom Taylor opened at the Haymarket. The Morning Post found the play "scarcely worthy" of the talents of its star, Edward Sothern, and The Era thought it "a sort of dramatic curiosity". It closed on 21 December 1861 after 36 performances; after this inauspicious start it was revived at the same theatre on 27 January 1862 and ran uninterruptedly until 23 December for 314 successive performances.

=== 1870–1900 ===
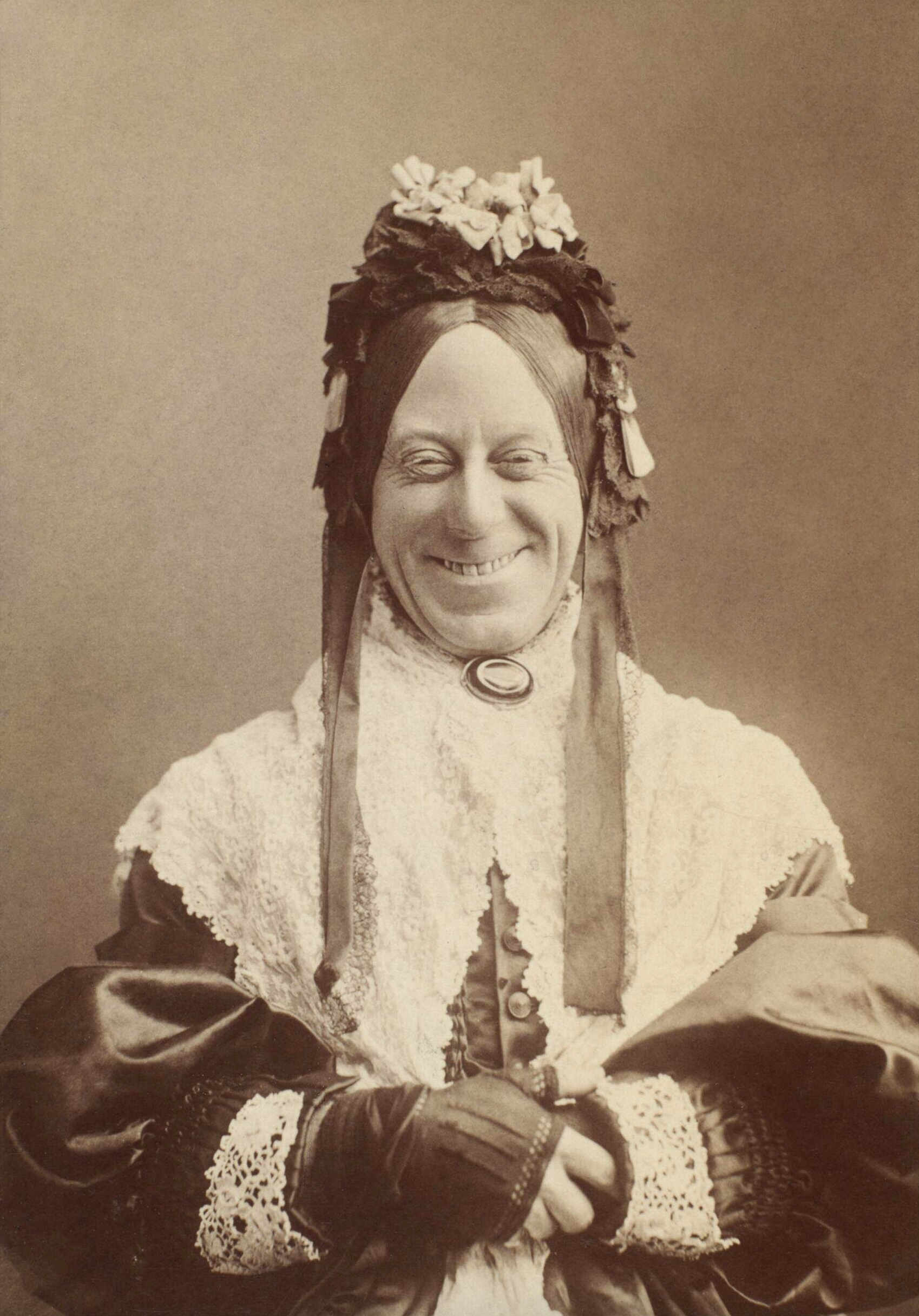
W. S. Penley as the bogus Charley's Aunt, 1892

Throughout the century, the audience for theatre was growing because of the rapidly expanding British population; improvement in education and the standard of living, especially of the middle class; improving public transport; and installation of street lighting, which made travel home from the theatre safer.

The first play to have a run of 1,000 successive performances was H. J. Byron's comedy Our Boys, which opened at the Vaudeville Theatre on 16 January 1875. It achieved two records: one for the number of performances – 1,362 – and another for the duration of its run: four years and three months, closing in April 1879. The second record lasted the longer, not broken until 1920. The initial run of Brandon Thomas's Charley's Aunt, which opened in London on 21 December 1892, totalled 1,466 performances, but because there were matinée performances as well as evening ones – something of an innovation – it broke the record in fewer weeks than Our Boys had run. Another long-running comedy of the period was Charles Hawtrey's farce The Private Secretary which opened in 1883 and ran for 785 performances.

In the musical theatre, there were substantial runs in the late 19th century for many of Gilbert and Sullivan's Savoy Operas, the longest-running of which were H.M.S. Pinafore (571 performances, 1878–1880), Patience (578 performances, 1881–1882), The Mikado (672 performances, 1885–1887), and The Gondoliers (554 performances, 1889–1891). None of the Savoy operas broke box-office records for continuous performances, and their runs were surpassed by those of two other comic operas: Robert Planquette's Les Cloches de Corneville, which opened in London in 1878 and ran for 705 performances, and Alfred Cellier and B. C. Stephenson's Dorothy, which ran for 931 performances in 1886–1889.

== 1900 to 1945 ==
Between 1900 and 1945 fourteen shows ran for more than 1,000 performances:

| Production | Genre | Theatre (Note: These are the theatres where the first performances of the runs were given. Some long-running shows moved to other theatres during their runs.) | Opened | Performances |
|---|---|---|---|---|
| A Chinese Honeymoon | Musical comedy | Strand | 1901 | 1,073 |
| A Little Bit of Fluff | Farce | Criterion | 1915 | 1,241 |
| Romance | Romantic drama | Duke of York's | 1915 | 1,049 |
| The Maid of the Mountains | Musical comedy | Daly's | 1917 | 1,352 |
| Chu Chin Chow | Musical comedy | His Majesty's | 1916 | 2,239 |
| The Beggar's Opera (revival) | Ballad opera | Lyric, Hammersmith | 1920 | 1,463 |
| The Farmer's Wife | Romantic comedy | Court | 1924 | 1,329 |
| The Wind and the Rain | Comedy | St Martin's | 1933 | 1,001 |
| French Without Tears | Comedy | Criterion | 1936 | 1,039 |
| Me and My Girl | Musical | Victoria Palace | 1937 | 1,646 |
| Blithe Spirit | Comedy | Piccadilly | 1941 | 1,997 |
| Quiet Week-end | Comedy | Wyndham's | 1941 | 1,059 |
| While the Sun Shines | Comedy | Globe | 1943 | 1,154 |
| Perchance to Dream | Musical | Hippodrome | 1945 | 1,022 |

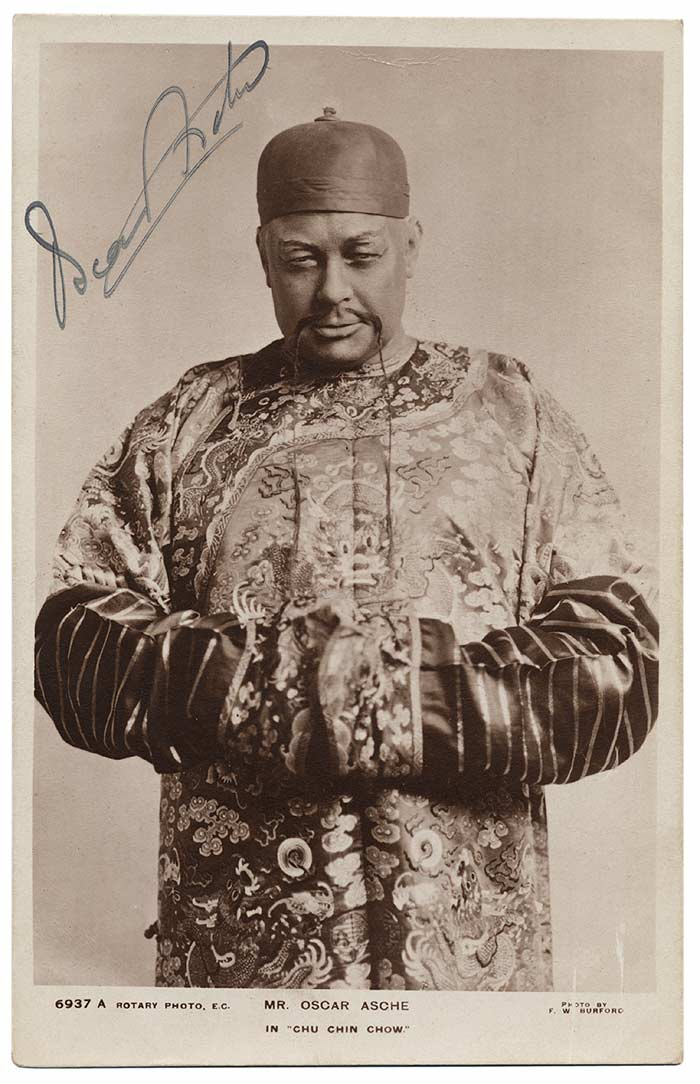
Chu Chin Chow, 1916

At around the turn of the 20th century and during the subsequent two decades musical comedies and operettas were popular. Such shows as San Toy (1899) The Arcadians (1909), The Merry Widow (1907), The Boy (1917) and The Lilac Domino (1918) ran for between 747 and 809 performances. Their runs, though considerable, broke no records, although A Chinese Honeymoon set a new record for musicals. By far the biggest success in musical – or any – theatre to that date came in October 1916 with Chu Chin Chow. It broke Charley's Aunt's record for the greatest number of consecutive performances, and in December 1920 surpassed the record of Our Boys for the longest continuous run. It ran until 22 July 1921, when it was played for the 2,239th time. No musical would surpass this record until Salad Days, which opened in 1954.

During the Second World War, after a brief shut-down in the early weeks of the war, London's theatres did good business, but only four shows that opened in the West End during the war years ran for more than 1,000 performances. Three were comedies: Noël Coward's Blithe Spirit, Esther McCracken's Quiet Week-end and Terence Rattigan's While the Sun Shines; the fourth was a musical: Ivor Novello's Perchance to Dream. Coward's comedy held the London record for the run of a non-musical play until overtaken by The Mousetrap in 1957.

== 1945 to 1970 ==
In the post-war era, several shows, mainly musicals, achieved runs of between 2,000 and 4,000 performances between 1945 and 1970:

| Production | Genre | Theatre | Opened | Performances |
|---|---|---|---|---|
| The Black and White Minstrel Show | Musical | Victoria Palace | 1962 | 4,344 |
| Oliver! | Musical | New | 1960 | 2,618 |
| The Sound of Music | Musical | Palace | 1961 | 2,386 |
| Salad Days | Musical | Vaudeville | 1954 | 2,283 |
| My Fair Lady | Musical | Drury Lane | 1958 | 2,281 |
| Charlie Girl | Musical | Adelphi | 1965 | 2,202 |
| The Boy Friend | Musical | Wyndham's | 1953 | 2,084 |
| Boeing Boeing | Farce | Apollo | 1962 | 2,035 |
| Fiddler on the Roof | Musical | Her Majesty's | 1967 | 2,030 |

=== The Mousetrap ===
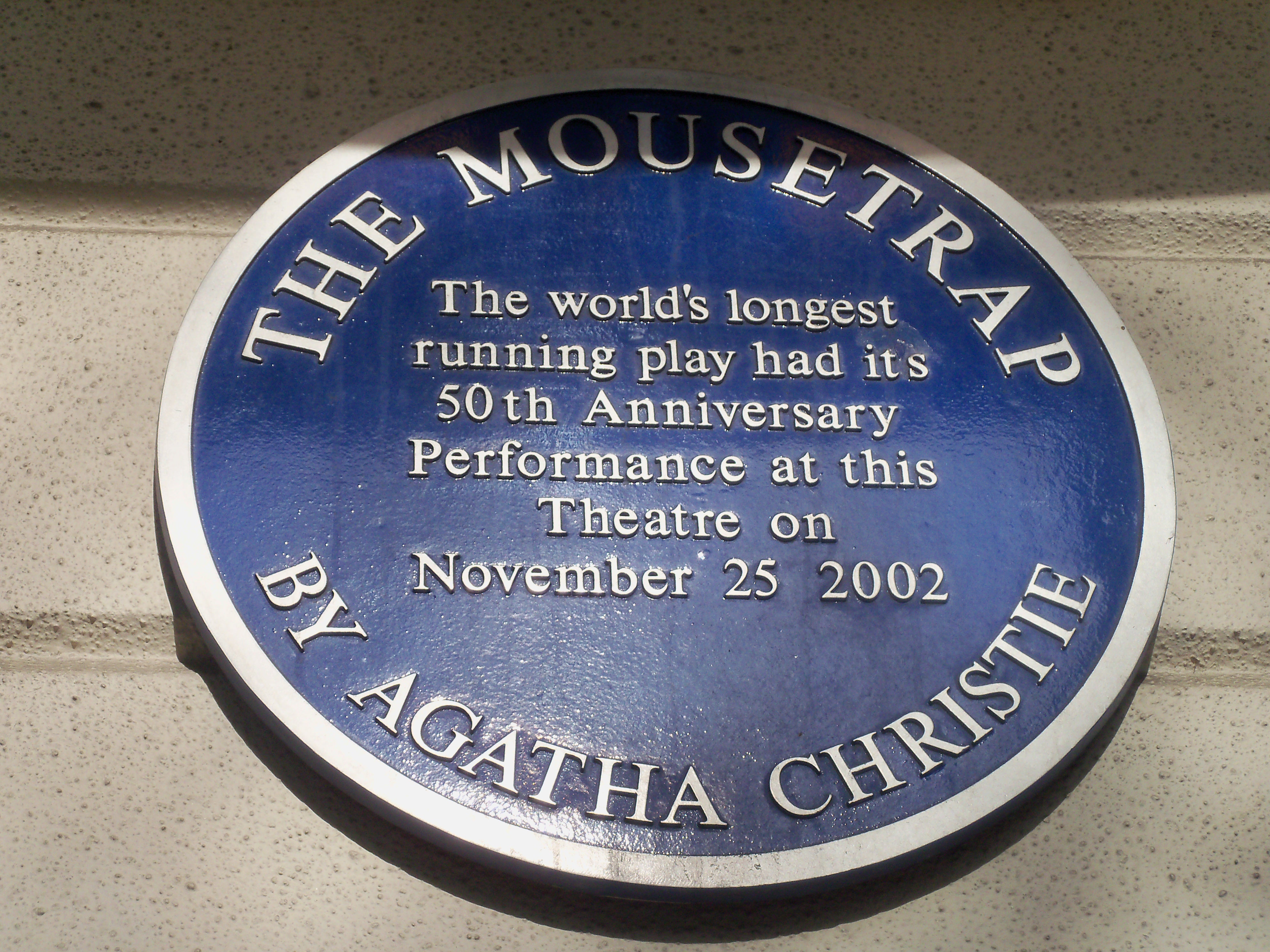
The Mousetrap: plaque at the St Martin's Theatre

None of the above productions, nor any that opened subsequently, have approached the length of the run of Agatha Christie's murder mystery The Mousetrap, which after a pre-London tour opened at the Ambassadors Theatre on 25 November 1952 and ran continuously there, and later at the larger St Martin's Theatre, until the closure of London's theatres in 2020. It broke the record for longest running non-musical play in 1957, and passed Chu-Chin-Chow's record as London's longest running show the following year. In February 2020 it had totalled 28,152 performances. A plaque (right) outside the St Martin's commemorates its status as the world's longest-running play.

=== 10,000+ performances ===
The longevity of The Mousetrap has eclipsed what would otherwise be the unprecedented run of Les Misérables and three other productions playing for more than 10,000 performances. All but the last of the four were running when the theatres shut in 2020. The list below gives performance totals as of January 2023.

| Production | Genre | Theatre | Opened | Performances |
|---|---|---|---|---|
| Les Misérables | Musical | Barbican | 1985 | 14,490 |
| The Phantom of the Opera | Musical | Her Majesty's | 1986 | 14,255 |
| The Woman in Black | Thriller | Strand | 1987 | 12,958 |
| Blood Brothers | Musical | Albery | 1986 | 10,013 |

=== Other long runs, 1970–present ===
Since 1970, the following other West End shows have run for 4,000 performances or more as of March 2020:

| Production | Genre | Theatre | Opened | Performances |
|---|---|---|---|---|
| Mamma Mia!* | Musical | Prince Edward | 1999 | 9,144 |
| Cats | Musical | New London | 1981 | 8,949 |
| The Lion King* | Musical | Lyceum | 1999 | 8,897 |
| Starlight Express | Musical | Apollo Victoria | 1984 | 7,406 |
| No Sex Please, We're British | Farce | Strand | 1971 | 6,761 |
| Stomp | Movement and percussion | Vaudeville | 2002 | 6,512 |
| Wicked* | Musical | Apollo Victoria | 2006 | 6,188 |
| Chicago | Musical | Adelphi | 1997 | 6,187 |
| Buddy | Musical | Victoria Palace | 1989 | 5,140 |
| We Will Rock You | Musical | Dominion | 2002 | 4,659 |
| Thriller – Live* | Musical | Lyric | 2009 | 4,613 |
| Billy Elliot the Musical | Musical | Victoria Palace | 2005 | 4,566 |
| Miss Saigon | Musical | Drury Lane | 1989 | 4,264 |
| Matilda the Musical* | Musical | Cambridge Theatre | 2011 | 4,000 |

The productions marked * were still running at the time of the 2020 shut-down of the theatres.

On 17 May 2021, The Mousetrap at St Martin's Theatre was the first West End show to re-open from the pandemic closures.

== Notes, references and sources ==
=== Sources ===
- Gänzl, Kurt; Andrew Lamb (1988). Gänzl's Book of the Musical Theatre. London: The Bodley Head. OCLC 966051934.
- Gaye, Freda, ed. (1967). Who's Who in the Theatre (fourteenth ed.). London: Sir Isaac Pitman and Sons. OCLC 5997224.
- Herbert, Ian, ed. (1972). Who's Who in the Theatre (fifteenth ed.). London: Sir Isaac Pitman and Sons. ISBN 978-0-273-31528-5.
- Jacobs, Arthur (1986). Arthur Sullivan – A Victorian Musician. Oxford University Press. ISBN 978-0-19-282033-4.
- Mander, Raymond; Joe Mitchenson (1975). The Theatres of London (second ed.). London: New English Library. ISBN 978-0-450-02123-7.
- Parker, John, ed. (1925). Who's Who in the Theatre (fifth ed.). London: Sir Isaac Pitman and Sons. OCLC 10013159.
- Richards, Jeffrey (2007). Sir Henry Irving: A Victorian Actor and His World. London: Bloomsbury. ISBN 978-1-85285-591-8.
- Rollins, Cyril; R. John Witts (1962). The D'Oyly Carte Opera Company in Gilbert and Sullivan Operas: A Record of Productions, 1875–1961. London: Michael Joseph. OCLC 504581419.
