= Tom and Jerry (Van Beuren) =

1930s animated characters created by the Van Beuren Studio

- Tom and Jerry characters
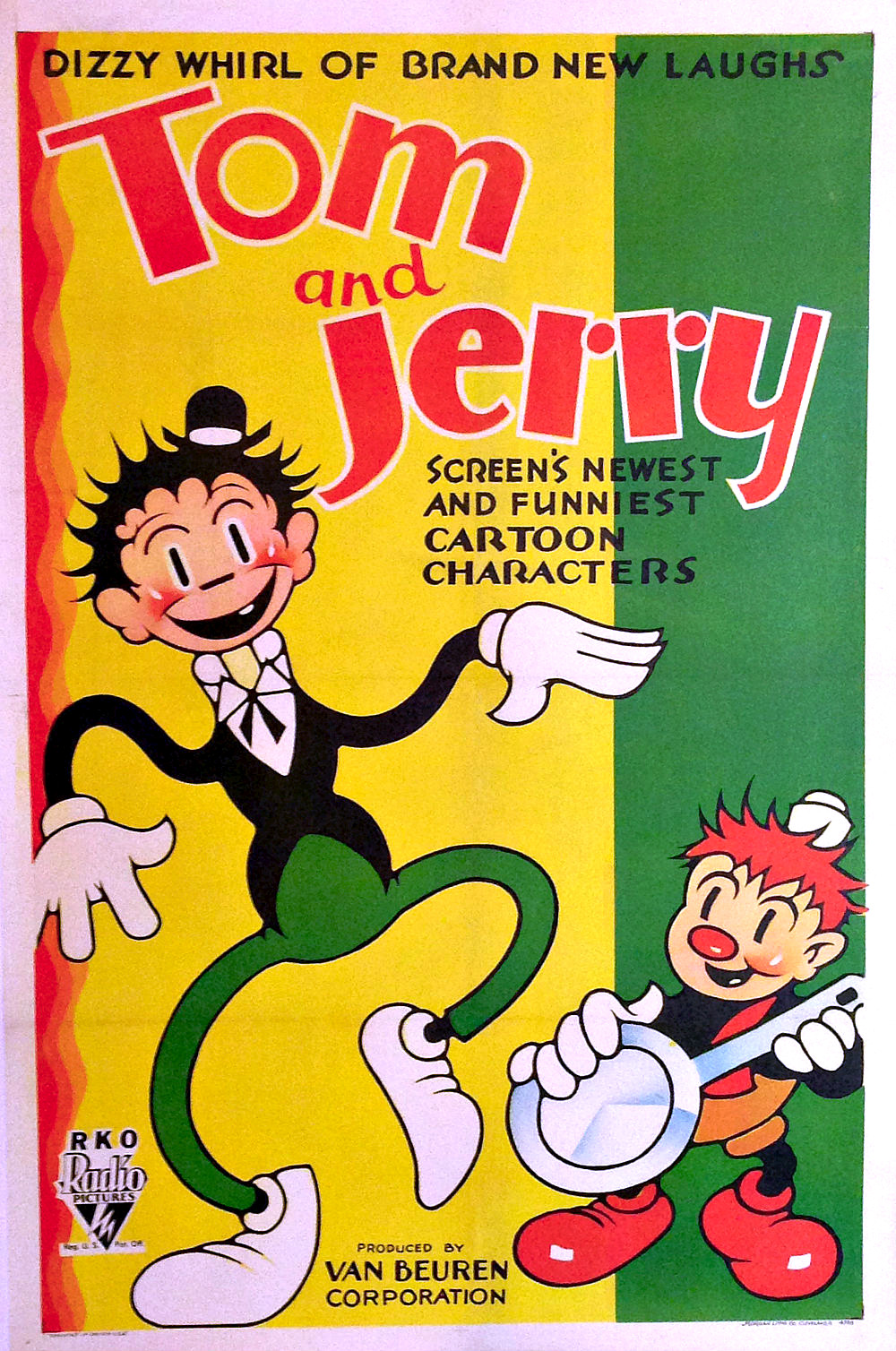
- Tom and Jerry Film Poster
- First appearance: “Wot a Night”; August 1, 1931
- Last appearance: "Galloping Fanny"; “The Phantom Rocket”; December 1, 1933 (minor), September 1, 1933 (major)
- Created by: John Foster; George Stallings

In-universe information
- Species: Human
- Gender: Male

Tom and Jerry (renamed Dick and Larry for 1940s home-movie reprints) is a series of short cartoons produced by Amedee J. Van Beuren and released by RKO Radio Pictures between 1931 and 1933. Each cartoon placed them in a new situation or occupation; the pair sang, danced and used musical effects and gags.

The characters are not related to MGM's later cat‑and‑mouse characters; instead they are a human comedy team: a tall, thin character (Tom) and his short, plump partner (Jerry) – a combination animation historians describe as “Mutt and Jeff-ish”.

== Origin and development ==
Van Beuren originally envisioned them as a cat‑and‑dog pair called “Waffles and Don” but later redesigned them as humans; the first released short was Wot a Night in 1931. Their design reflected the "rubber‑hose" animation style -- distinguished by elastic, cylindrical anatomies -- popular in New York at the time.

Although the series was notable for its early and inventive use of synchronized sound, blending musical rhythm closely with on‑screen action, and often incorporated quirky humor and pre‑Code innuendo, it nevertheless failed to rival the popularity of its competitors in the early sound era, such as Mickey Mouse or Betty Boop.

== Reception ==
Trade journals of the 1930s generally gave the Tom and Jerry cartoons good reviews. Film Daily liked Puzzled Pals: "Some novel gags, and a lively cartoon that will please."

== Voice talent ==
Few records exist of the voice actors. Animation historian Hal Erickson notes that when the characters spoke they were likely voiced by staff from the neighboring Fleischer studio. In December 1932 the trade journal Film Daily reported that singer Margie Hines – the original voice of Betty Boop – signed an exclusive contract with Van Beuren to provide cartoon voiceovers.

Erickson writes that Hines remained at the studio until 1934, after which she returned to Fleischer and became the voice of Olive Oyl. Her distinctive Betty Boop‑like singing can be heard in cartoons such as Magic Mummy (1933) and Tight Rope Tricks (1933), which features a female character very closely modeled on Betty Boop.

== Name and cultural context ==
The names “Tom” and “Jerry” were not created by Van Beuren. Pierce Egan's 1821 book Life in London featured Regency rakes named Tom and Jerry; the book spawned a successful stage adaptation and a popular Christmas cocktail called the Tom and Jerry.

The phrase entered popular vocabulary by the mid‑19th century, writers at Sea Lion Press contend that Van Beuren likely named his cartoon characters after the cocktail rather than the book.

== Management change and series decline ==
By mid‑1933, RKO had grown dissatisfied with the creative direction of the shorts, viewing them as too surreal and lacking in broad commercial appeal. According to animator Mannie Davis, RKO installed Hiram S. Brown, Jr. (nicknamed "Bunny" and the son of RKO executive Hiram Brown) as business manager in 1933. Brown clashed with Foster, and Foster's name disappeared from credits after March 1933.

Film Daily announced on September 1, 1933 that the last Tom and Jerry cartoon produced was Dough-Nuts, and that the series had been discontinued, to be replaced by Otto Soglow's character "The Little King". On September 21, 1933, supervisor Brown slashed the payroll by discharging 10 animators and assistants (from a staff of 96, according to head animator Harry Bailey). Film Daily expressed surprise: "Harry D. Bailey, one of the head animators who has been with the company 12 years, and George Rufle, another chief animator, were among the departures." Supervisor Brown went on to head the serial unit at Republic Pictures.

In the mid-1940’s, Official Films acquired many films from Van Beuren's library for home-movie distribution (and later television syndication). The Tom and Jerry characters were renamed Dick and Larry to avoid confusion with MGM's unrelated cat‑and‑mouse series of the same name. That later MGM series was co‑created by American animator and cartoonist Joseph Barbera, who had worked on the Van Beuren Tom and Jerry shorts early in his career, as an animator and scenario writer.

== Filmography ==
=== 1931 ===
#	Title	Directors	Film	Distributor	Release Date	Notes
1	Wot a Night	John Foster & George Stallings		RKO Radio Pictures	August 1, 1931	The first Van Beuren Tom and Jerry cartoon.
2	Polar Pals	John Foster & George Rufle		RKO Radio Pictures	September 5, 1931	
3	Trouble	John Foster & George Stallings		RKO Radio Pictures	October 10, 1931	
4	Jungle Jam	John Foster & George Rufle		RKO Radio Pictures	November 14, 1931	
5	A Swiss Trick	John Foster & George Stallings		RKO Radio Pictures	December 19, 1931	

==== 1932 ====
#	Title	Directors	Film	Distributor	Release Date	Notes
6	Rocketeers	John Foster & George Rufle		RKO Radio Pictures	January 30, 1932	
7	Rabid Hunters	John Foster & George Stallings		RKO Radio Pictures	February 27, 1932	
8	In the Bag	John Foster & George Rufle		RKO Radio Pictures	March 26, 1932	
9	Joint Wipers	John Foster & George Stallings		RKO Radio Pictures	April 23, 1932	
10	Pots and Pans	John Foster & George Rufle		RKO Radio Pictures	May 14, 1932	
11	The Tuba Tooter	John Foster & George Stallings		RKO Radio Pictures	June 4, 1932	
12	Plane Dumb	John Foster & George Rufle		RKO Radio Pictures	June 4, 1932	
13	Redskin Blues	John Foster & George Stallings		RKO Radio Pictures	July 23, 1932	
14	Jolly Fish	John Foster & George Stallings		RKO Radio Pictures	August 19, 1932	Later released by Official Films for home movie use.
15	Barnyard Bunk	John Foster & George Rufle		RKO Radio Pictures	September 16, 1932	Later released by Official Films for home movie use.
16	A Spanish Twist	John Foster & George Stallings		RKO Radio Pictures	October 7, 1932	The first of two Tom and Jerry cartoons which do not have the main characters animated on the title screen.
17	Piano Tooners	John Foster & George Rufle		RKO Radio Pictures	November 11, 1932	
18	Pencil Mania	John Foster & George Stallings		RKO Radio Pictures	December 9, 1932	

=== 1933 ===
#	Title	Directors	Film	Distributor	Release Date	Notes
19	Tight Rope Tricks	John Foster & George Rufle		RKO Radio Pictures	January 6, 1933	Later released by Official Films for home movie use.
20	Magic Mummy	John Foster & George Stallings		RKO Radio Pictures	February 3, 1933	
21	Happy Hoboes	John Foster & George Rufle		RKO Radio Pictures	March 31, 1933	Later released by Official Films for home movie use.
22	Puzzled Pals	George Stallings & Frank Sherman		RKO Radio Pictures	March 31, 1933	
23	Hook and Ladder Hokum	George Stallings & Tish Tash		RKO Radio Pictures	April 28, 1933	Later retitled as “Fire! Fire!” by Official Films and as “A Fireman’s Life” for television releases.
24	In the Park	John Foster & George Rufle		RKO Radio Pictures	May 26, 1933	
25	Dough Nuts	John Foster & George Rufle		RKO Radio Pictures	July 7, 1933	
26	The Phantom Rocket	John Foster & George Rufle		RKO Radio Pictures	July 28, 1933	The last Van Beuren Tom and Jerry cartoon, though the characters still appeared in cameo appearances until the end of the year. The 2nd cartoon where Tom and Jerry are not animated on the title card.

== Copyright status ==
All cartoons in the Tom and Jerry animated short films produced by Van Beuren Studios (1931–1933) have entered the public domain in the United States. All were originally released during the early 1930s and therefore fell under U.S. copyright law in force at the time, which granted an initial 28‑year term followed by the option for a renewal term extending for an additional 28 years. Renewals were required to be filed in the 28th calendar year after publication; otherwise, the works entered the public domain at the end of that year.

A review of the U.S. Copyright Office's Catalog of Copyright Entries renewal listings for 1958–1961 reveals that none of the Van Beuren Tom and Jerry shorts was renewed. This is in unusual contrast to other Van Beuren titles (non‑animated live‑action films) that were renewed during the same period.

== Home video availability ==
Several of the Van Beuren Tom and Jerry shorts have been released on home video in various collections. Thunderbean Animation issued a DVD set of the series in 2010, followed by an upgraded Blu‑ray edition in January 2024 sourced from the best surviving prints, including Piano Tooners from the original camera negative.

Mill Creek Entertainment has included 12 of the 26 shorts across multiple compilation sets, such as Giant 600 Cartoon Collection, 150 Cartoon Classics, 100 Classic Cartoons, and 200 Classic Cartoons. The shorts have also appeared in themed releases including Tom Sawyer, and Other Cartoon Treasures.

Individual titles have been issued in other collections. The Tuba Tooter was released on DVD in Tom and Jerry & Friends: The Tuba Tooter as part of Digiview Productions’ Cartoon Craze series, and also appeared in the 350 Classic Cartoons compilation. Some shorts have been restored for inclusion in volumes of the Cartoon Roots Blu‑ray series.

== See also ==
- List of animated films in the public domain in the United States
