= Michael Howe, The Terror of Van Diemen's Land =

1821 play by John H. Amherst

- State Library of Tasmania
- Original language: English
- Written by: John H. Amherst
- Based on: Statistical, historical, and political description of the colony of New South Wales by W C Wentworth
- Subject: bushranger Michael Howe
- Setting: Tasmania

Premiere
- Date: April 1821
- Place: Royal Coburg Theatre, London

Michael Howe, The Terror of Van Diemen's Land is an 1821 British play by John H. Amherst about the bushranger Michael Howe. It was the first play ever written about Tasmania.

It premiered at London's Royal Coburg Theatre in April 1821.

The play was revived in October 1821 as a benefit for the actor Henry Sloman (1793-1873). No surviving manuscript of the play is known to exist.

The play was performed in Hobart in 1845. An advertisement for this said the play ran for more than 300 performances at "The Surrey Theatre" but this may be a reference to another play about Howe, Van Dieman's Land.

== Background ==
Michael Howe was executed in 1818. That year saw publication of the book Michael Howe : the last and worst of the bushrangers of Van Diemen's Land. However the play was based on another book, Statistical, historical, and political description of the colony of New South Wales, and its Dependent Settlements in Van Diemen's Land by William Wentworth.
