= Tom and Jerry (drink) =

Christmas-time cocktail in the United States

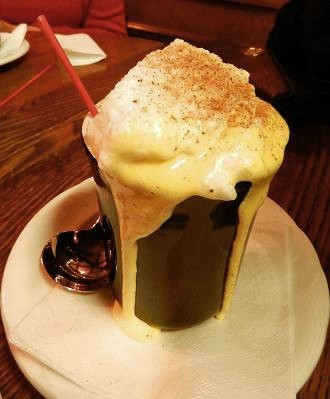
- A Tom & Jerry cocktail
- Type: Cocktail
- Ingredients: Eggs or egg whites, powdered sugar, brandy, rum
- Standard drinkware: Mug
- Served: Hot in a mug or bowl
- Preparation: Separate eggs. Beat egg whites until stiff. Mix egg yolks with powdered sugar. Put a spoonful of yolk mixture in cup, and mix with brandy and rum. Fold in some egg white, then add hot milk and top with more egg white. Stir gently to fold in the egg white. Top with Nutmeg.

A Tom and Jerry is a traditional Christmas-time cocktail in the United States, sometimes attributed to the British writer and boxing journalist Pierce Egan in the 1820s. It is a variant of eggnog with brandy and rum added and served hot, usually in a mug or a bowl.

Another method uses egg whites, beaten stiff, with the yolks and sugar folded back in, and optionally vanilla extract added. A few spoonfuls are added to a mug, then hot milk and rum are added, and it is topped with nutmeg. Pre-made Tom and Jerry batter, typically produced by manufacturers in Wisconsin, Minnesota, the Dakotas, and Montana, is sold in regional supermarkets during the Christmas season.

== Name ==
The drink's name is a reference to Egan's book Life in London, or The Day and Night Scenes of Jerry Hawthorn Esq. and his Elegant Friend Corinthian Tom (1821), and the subsequent stage play Tom and Jerry, or Life in London (also 1821). To publicize the book and the play, Egan introduced a variation of eggnog by adding 1/2 US fluid ounce (15 ml) of brandy, calling it a "Tom and Jerry". The additional fortification helped popularize the drink.

== In popular culture ==
- Tom and Jerry was a favorite of President Warren G. Harding, who served it at an annual Christmas party for his closest friends.
- Two cartoon duos, a short-lived Tom and Jerry from Van Beuren Studios in the 1930s and MGM's better known cat and mouse rivalry from the 1940s through the 1960s, later bore the name, possibly as a play on words with the drink or the literary works that inspired it.
- In the story "I Yust Go Nuts at Christmas" by Harry Stewart, a man drinks a dozen Tom and Jerrys and is hung over for the following day's Christmas dinner.
- In the movie Beyond Tomorrow (1940), RKO Radio Pictures, the story takes place at the Christmas season, and every visitor to the house of the three older gentlemen is offered a "Tom And Jerry" Cocktail.

== See also ==
- List of cocktails
