= The Flash Press =

Book by Helen Lefkowitz Horowitz

The Flash Press: Sporting Male Weeklies in 1840s New York
- Author: Patricia Cline Cohen; Timothy J. Gilfoyle; Helen Lefkowitz Horowitz
- Subject: Sexual underground of 1840s
- Set in: New York City
- Publisher: The University of Chicago Press
- Publication date: May 2008
- Pages: 288
- ISBN: 9780226112343
- Website: press.uchicago.edu/ucp/books/book/chicago/F/bo5186382.html

The Flash Press: Sporting Male Weeklies in 1840s New York is a book written by Patricia Cline Cohen, Timothy J. Gilfoyle, and Helen Lefkowitz Horowitz, in association with the American Antiquarian Society, about the sexual underground of 1840s New York City.

The Flash Press looks at four "Sporting Male Weeklies" that were found in New York between 1841–1843: The Flash (The Sunday Flash), The Libertine, The Weekly Rake, and The Whip.

These newspapers were considered to be "obscene, libidinous, loathsome, and lascivious." The Flash Press takes a look at why these newspapers were considered to be so obscene. It also explores the individuals that these papers targeted: where they lived, where they worked and what was the appeal to them of the newspapers.

The introduction offers an overview of how the American Antiquarian Society came into possession of the newspapers, and how Cohen, Gilfoyle, and Horowitz came to research the newspapers and author The Flash Press.
