= Helen Lefkowitz Horowitz =

American historian (born 1942)

- Born: January 31, 1942 (age 83); Shreveport, Louisiana, U.S.
- Education: C. E. Byrd High School; Wellesley College (BA); Harvard University (PhD)
- Occupation: Historian
- Spouse: Dan Horowitz (m. 1963)
- Children: 2

Helen Lefkowitz Horowitz (born January 31, 1942) is an American historian and the Sydenham Clark Parsons Professor of American Studies and History, emerita, at Smith College.

== Early life and education ==
Horowitz was born on January 31, 1942, in Shreveport, Louisiana, to Rabbi David Lefkowitz, Jr. and Leona Atlas Lefkowitz. Rabbi David (1911–1999) served as rabbi at Temple B'nai Zion in Shreveport and Leona (1917–2014) was a tutor in math, informal college counselor, civic worker, community board member, and housewife. David Lefkowitz is her paternal grandfather. Horowitz was educated in Shreveport, and graduated from C. E. Byrd High School in 1959.

She earned a B.A. from Wellesley College in 1963 and earned a Ph.D. in American studies from Harvard University in 1969.

== Career ==
Horowitz taught at MIT, Union College, Scripps College, the University of Southern California, Carleton College, and University of Michigan. Her last position was at Smith College, where she is currently Sydenham Clark Parsons Professor of History, emerita.

A cultural historian of the United States, Horowitz's research ranges over a number of areas, including cultural philanthropy, women, higher education, landscape studies, sexuality, sexual representation, censorship, understandings of mental health and illness, intimate life, tourism, and biography.

Culture and the City (1974) examined the cultural institutions of Chicago in the late 19th and early 20th centuries. A series of articles on zoological gardens looked at the changing conceptions of wild animals in relation to humans as expressed in the manner in which the zoo animals were exhibited. Alma Mater (1984) probed the ways in which founders of the Seven Sister Colleges expressed their hopes and fears about women offered the liberal arts in the colleges' buildings and landscapes; the book explored, as well, the lives of female collegians and their female professors as lived within college gates. Campus Life (1987) looked at the history of undergraduate cultures from the 18th century to the present, with attention to college men (and later, women), outsiders, and rebels. The Power and Passion of M. Carey Thomas, president of Bryn Mawr College and feminist, 1857–1935, appeared in 1984. The designated literary executor of John Brinckerhoff Jackson, she wrote the introductions and edited, Landscape in Sight: J. B. Jackson's America (New Haven: Yale University Press, 1997). Rereading Sex (2002), explored sexual representations and the campaign to censor them that led to the landmark Comstock Law of 1873 that barred obscene materials, contraceptive information and devices, and abortion advertisements from the US mails. The Flash Press (2008), co-authored with Patricia Cline Cohen and Timothy Gilfoyle, inquired into the sporting weeklies of New York City in the 1840s. Wild Unrest (2010) focused on Charlotte Perkins Gilman, the understanding of mental health and illness in the 19th century, and the writing of "The Yellow Wall-Paper". A Taste for Provence (2016) tells the story of the re-invention of Provence for American travelers from a place of Roman ruins to a new Eden of earthly delights. Traces of J. B. Jackson: The Man Who Taught Us to See Everyday America (2020) offers the biography in the form of essays on the important writer on the landscape.

== Personal life ==
Horowitz married fellow historian Dan Horowitz in 1963; they have two adult children.

== Awards and honors ==
- 1972–73 Fellow of the Smithsonian Institution
- 1995 Lambda Literary Awards, Lesbian Biography/Autobiography finalist for The Power and Passion of M. Carey Thomas
- 1999–2000 Mellon Fellowship at the American Antiquarian Society
- 2000–01 Fellow at Radcliffe Institute
- 2003 Pulitzer Prize finalist in history for Rereading Sex
- 2003 Merle Curti Award (Organization of American Historians) for Rereading Sex
- 2003 Francis Parkman Prize finalist, for Rereading Sex
- 2010 Los Angeles Times Distinguished Fellow at the Huntington Library

== Works ==
- Warming up Julia Child (2022). New York: Pegasus Books.
- Traces of J. B. Jackson: The Man Who Taught Us to See Everyday America (2020). Charlottesville: University of Virginia Press. ISBN 978-0-8139-4334-3
- A Taste for Provence (2016). Chicago: University of Chicago Press. ISBN 9780226322841
- Wild Unrest: Charlotte Perkins Gilman and the Making of "The Yellow Wall-paper" (2010). Oxford: Oxford University Press. ISBN 9780199739806
- John S. Sargent: Portraits in Praise of Women (with Patricia Hills) (2010). Cooperstown, New York: Fenimore Art Museum. ISBN 9780917334382
- The Flash Press: Sporting Male Weeklies in 1840s New York (with Patricia Cline Cohen and Timothy Gilfoyle) (2008). Chicago: University of Chicago Press. ISBN 9780226112343
- Attitudes toward Sex in Antebellum America: A Brief History with Documents (2006). New York: Palgrave Macmillian. ISBN 9781403971555
- Rereading Sex: Battles over Sexual Knowledge and Suppression in Nineteenth-Century America (2002). New York: Alfred A. Knopf. ISBN 9780375401923
- Landscape in Sight: Looking at America (with John Brinckerhoff Jackson) (1997). New Haven: Yale University Press. ISBN 9780300071160
- Love Across the Color Line: The Letters of Alice Haley to Channing Lewis (ed. with Kathy Peiss) (1996). Amherst: University of Massachusetts Press. ISBN 9781558490246
- The Power and Passion of M. Carey Thomas (1994). New York: Alfred A. Knopf. ISBN 9780394572277
- Campus Life : Undergraduate Cultures from the End of the Eighteenth Century to the Present (1987). New York: A. A. Knopf. ISBN 9780394549972
- Alma Mater: Design and Experience in the Women's Colleges from Their Nineteenth-Century Beginnings to the 1930s (1984). New York: Alfred A. Knopf. ISBN 9780394534398
- Culture and the City: Cultural Philanthropy in Chicago from the 1880s to 1917 (1976). Lexington, Kentucky: University Press of Kentucky. ISBN 9780813113449

== See also ==
- List of historians
