= Timothy Gilfoyle =

American historian from New York

- Occupation: Historian
- Awards: Guggenheim Fellowship (1998)

Academic background
- Education: Columbia University (BA, PhD)

Academic work
- Sub-discipline: Urban history
- Institutions: Loyola University Chicago

Timothy J. Gilfoyle is an American historian from New York who is a professor of history at Loyola University Chicago, where he teaches American urban and social history.

He gained a B.A. in 1979, followed by a Ph.D. in history at Columbia University in 1987. He is the former president of the Urban History Association (2015–16).

His academic research is mainly concerned with the evolution of 19th-century underworld subcultures and informal economies.

== Honors and awards ==
Gilfoyle is a Guggenheim Fellow (1998–99) and a senior fellow at the Smithsonian Institution's National Museum of American History (1997).

He is an elected fellow of the Society of American Historians (2011) and the American Antiquarian Society (2007).

== Bibliography ==
The following are some of Gilfoyle's books:

- City of Eros: New York City, Prostitution, and the Commercialization of Sex, 1790-1920 (1992)
- A Pickpocket's Tale: The Underworld of Nineteenth-Century New York (2006)
- Millennium Park: Creating a Chicago Landmark (2006)
- The Flash Press: Sporting Male Weeklies in 1840s New York (co-authored, 2008)
- The Urban Underworld in Late Nineteenth-Century New York (2013)
