= Plane Dumb =

1932 film

- Directed by: John Foster; George Rufle
- Starring: Aubrey Lyles; F.E. Miller
- Production company: Van Beuren Studios
- Distributed by: RKO-Pathé Distributing Corp.
- Release date: June 25, 1932 (United States)
- Running time: 7 minutes
- Country: United States
- Language: English

Plane Dumb is the 12th Van Beuren Tom and Jerry cartoon, released on June 4, 1932. The cartoon's soundtrack is done by Gene Rodemich.

== Plot ==
The complete cartoon short.

Tom and Jerry are flying a small airplane and find themselves off the coast of Africa. In an ill-advised effort to fit in among the natives, the two decide to don blackface and talk in a stereotypical African-American dialect. While doing this, the plane goes off balance and crashes into the ocean. After encounters with sharks, an overly-friendly octopus, and a whale, Tom and Jerry make it to the mainland. They are confronted by beasts of the African jungle, from which they take refuge in a cave, where they meet some skeletal Africans that were retooled from the first Tom and Jerry short, "Wot a Night." Once Tom and Jerry come out of the cave, African tribesmen (also stereotypically portrayed as spear-chuckers with bones in their hair) appear from behind almost every rock and crevice, outraged at the sight of the two in blackface, and begin an angry pursuit. The cartoon ends with Tom and Jerry wiping the blackface off their face, still running away from the Africans.
