= Pencil Mania =

1932 film

the full cartoon short.

Pencil Mania is a 1932 animated cartoon in the Van Beuren Studios Tom and Jerry series that breaks the fourth wall of theatre and film. The two main characters become animators in the film, and draw various cartoon scenarios against the blank background, and interact with them. The short was created by John Foster and Vernon Stallings (credited as Geo. Stallings), with synchronization by Gene Rodemich, distributed by RKO Radio Pictures and released through Library Films. The opening credits are played over the song "I'm Looking Over a Four Leaf Clover". Run time is 6:54. It is believed to be in the public domain.
