= Pots and Pans (film) =

1932 film

- Directed by: John Foster; George Ruffle
- Produced by: Amadee J. Van Beuren
- Color process: Black and white
- Production company: Van Beuren Studios
- Distributed by: RKO Pictures
- Release date: May 14, 1932
- Running time: 6 minutes
- Country: United States
- Language: English

Pots and Pans is the 10th Van Beuren Tom and Jerry cartoon, released on May 14, 1932, with a running time of 6:12 minutes. The cartoon's soundtrack is done by Gene Rodemich.

== Plot ==
the full cartoon short.

Tom and Jerry are the owners of a diner car where they perform their duties in time to the music - and the food can't resist dancing while being prepared. Eventually a quartet of customers join in and the resulting energy of the music sends the new shoes rolling onto an active track where it hits a real train engine head-on and coming in the opposite direction...
