= Tom and Jerry, or Life in London =

Stage adaptation by William Moncrieff of Pierce Egan's Life in London, ...

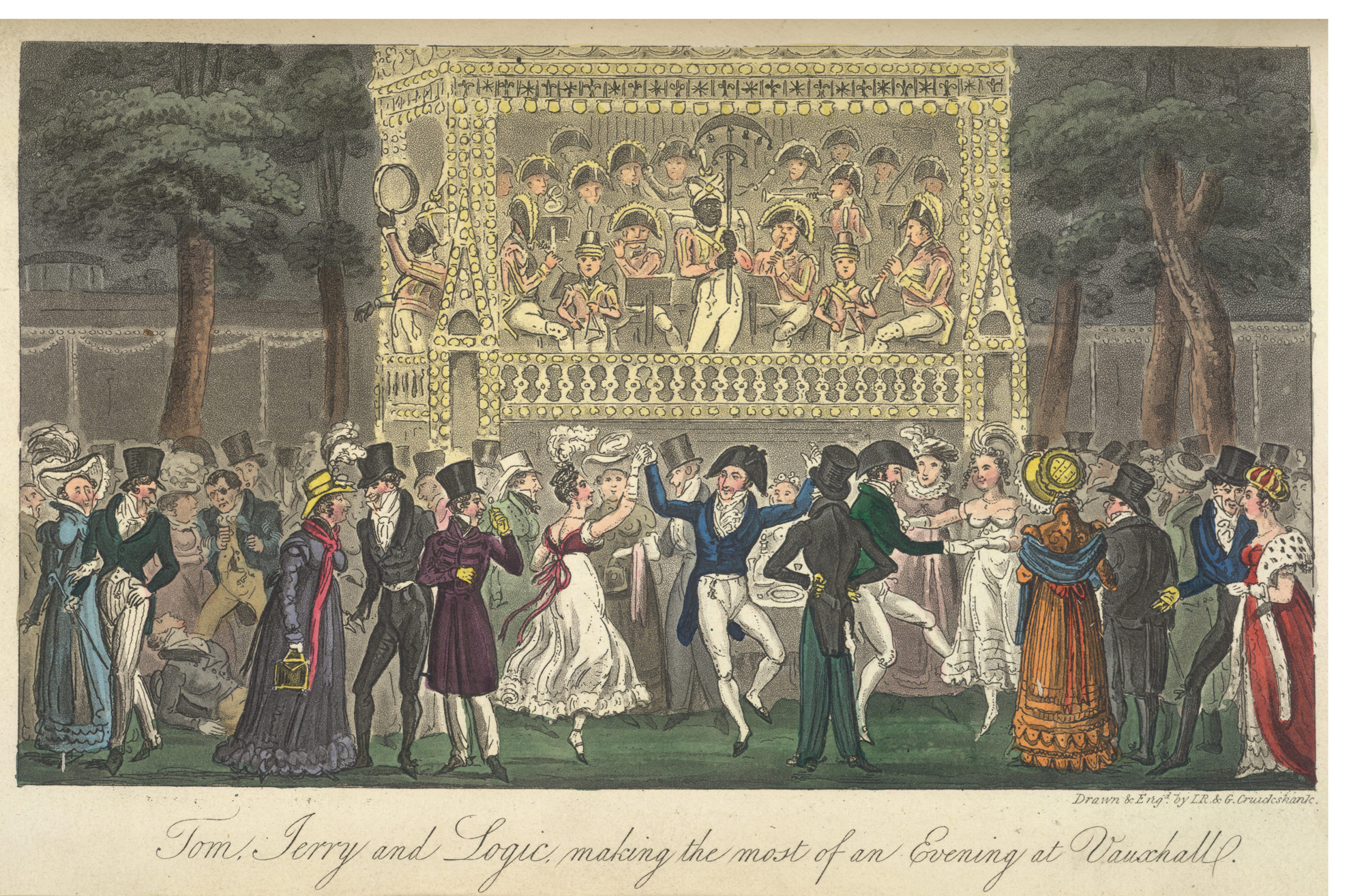
Painting by the Cruikshanks for the book on which the play is based

Tom and Jerry, or Life in London, first staged in 1821 was one of several stage adaptations of Pierce Egan's popular book Life in London, published earlier in that year. Its most successful production at the Adelphi Theatre in the West End saw Tom and Jerry become the first play to have a continuous run of 100 performances in London.

The play depicts the adventures and misadventures of two young men in London, encountering both high- and low-life.

== Background ==
In 1821 a popular book was published, at first in monthly instalments beginning in January, with the title Life in London or, The Day and Night Scenes of Jerry Hawthorn, Esq. and his Elegant Friend Corinthian Tom in their Rambles and Sprees through the Metropolis. It was written by Pierce Egan and had coloured illustrations by Robert Cruikshank and his brother George. There being little copyright protection at that time, several theatre proprietors hastened to present their own versions of the book.

== Stage versions ==
The first stage adaptation was produced at Astley's Theatre in September 1821, arranged by W. Barrymore, as Life in London, or Day and Night Scenes of Tom and Jerry in their Rambles and Sprees through the Metropolis. It was followed by a version adapted by Charles Dibdin the younger at the Olympic Theatre, on 12 November 1821, similarly titled Life in London. This version starred William Oxberry as the simple Jerry and John Baker as the bustling Tom. It was well received by an audience that included the Duke of Wellington and other celebrities, and ran until 5 January of the following year. The Morning Post judged it favourably: "It is replete with wit and bustle; and while it abounds with laughable incident, it affords an excellent moral, by exhibiting the ill effects of dissipation and bad company [and] drunkenness, quarrelling and duelling."

The most successful version was written by W. T. Moncrieff, and produced under the title Tom and Jerry, or Life in London, at the Adelphi Theatre on 26 November 1821, described as a Burletta in three acts. The Cruikshank brothers designed the costumes and scenery; Benjamin Wrench and Watkins Burroughs starred in the title roles, with the comedian Robert Keeley in a supporting part. This version achieved the distinction of being the first stage work to have a run of 100 performances in London; (Note: Hitherto, the record for London's longest-running stage work had been held for nearly a century by The Beggar's Opera with a run of 62 performances in 1728.) it was played continuously until 30 March 1822. It was revived on 7 October 1822 and ran until 4 January 1823. The piece contained numerous songs, with new words fitted to familiar tunes such as "Over the Hills and Far Away","Carnival of Venice" and "Zitti, Zitti—Piano, Piano" from The Barber of Seville. Among the characters in the piece was Billy Waters, a caricature of a well-known street performer; the real Waters found his income devastated as a result of the portrayal of beggars making an easy and lucrative living.

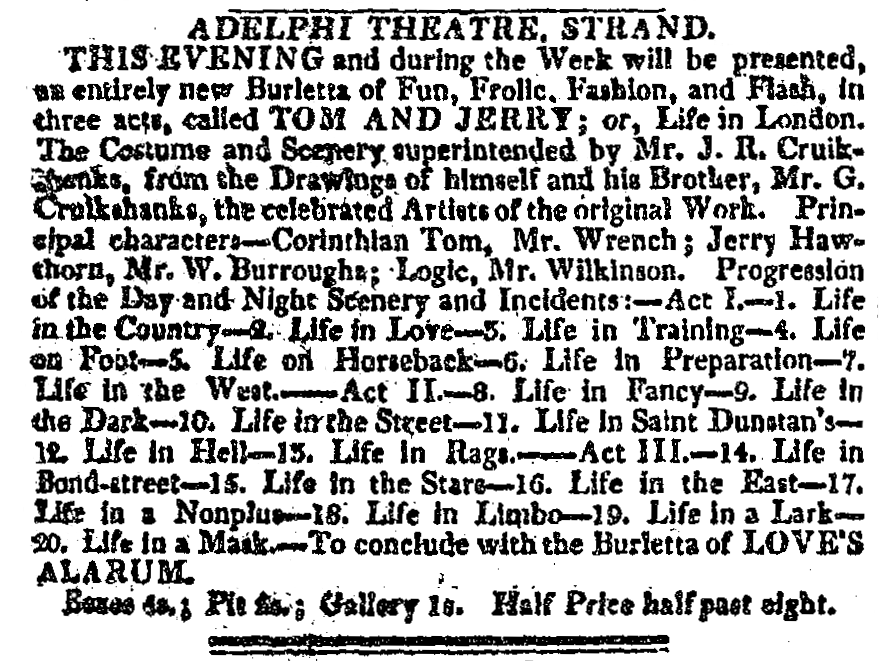
Advertisement for Adelphi production, 1821

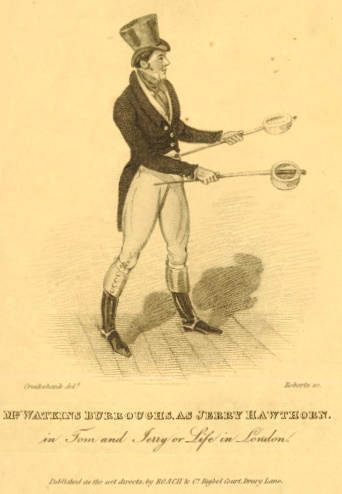
Watkins Burroughs as Jerry, Adelphi, 1821

Cast of Adelphi production

Moncrieff wrote in his introduction to the published text of the play that some puritanical religious figures denounced Tom and Jerry from the pulpit, and the less liberal elements of the press complained of its immorality. The official censor, the Lord Chamberlain, the Duke of Montrose, was called on to suppress the piece, but he came to see it one night and returned the next, bringing his Duchess.

The Adelphi's version was immediately followed by a sequel, called Green in France, or Tom and Jerry's Tour, which ran from 6 January to 22 March 1823. The Olympic version was revived – this time under the title of Tom and Jerry – on 28 October 1822 and ran until 4 January 1823. The success of the piece led to imitations, and during 1822 ten theatres in and around London were playing Tom and Jerry. One of these adaptations was by Egan – author of the original book – but it was Moncrieff's version that became popular throughout Britain and, later, in the US, where it was first played at the Park Theatre, New York, in 1823. According to the Oxford Companion to American Theatre, the play's combination of a tour of London interspersed with song and dance, gave rise to numerous similar, loosely constructed entertainments, and "planted the seeds for later musical comedy and revue". Tom and Jerry was given in French in Paris in 1822.

== Linguistic legacy ==
After the publication of Egan's book and the various theatrical adaptations, the term "Tom and Jerry" entered the English language. The Oxford English Dictionary cites examples of its use – to describe young men given to drinking, gambling, and riotous living – in the US, Australia and Britain throughout the 19th and 20th centuries and into the 21st. In British usage a "Tom and Jerry shop" was a 19th-century term for a small tavern or alehouse – "especially one regarded as disreputable". In American usage the phrase "Tom and Jerry" came to be applied from at latest the 1840s to an alcoholic drink resembling egg nog. The use of the names for the popular cartoon cat and mouse is evidently unconnected with Egan's heroes: the names of the feline and rodent protagonists were chosen from suggestions by hundreds of MGM employees in a competition before the series was launched in 1940.

== Notes, references and sources ==
=== Sources ===
- Hotten, John Camden (1869). "Introduction". Life in London. London: Hotten. OCLC 1157997103.
- Moncrieff, W. T. (1826). Tom and Jerry: Or, Life In London In 1820. London: Thomas Hailes Lacy. ProQuest 2138577344.
- Parker, John, ed. (1925). Who's Who in the Theatre (fifth ed.). London: Sir Isaac Pitman and Sons. OCLC 10013159.
- Room, Adrian (2000). Brewer's Dictionary of Modern Phrase and Fable. London: Cassell. ISBN 978-0-304-35381-1.
