= Van Dieman's Land (play) =

- Original language: Engliah
- Written by: William Thomas Moncrieff
- Subject: Matthew Howe
- Setting: Colonial Tasmania

Premiere
- Date: 10 February 1830
- Place: Surrey Theatre, London

Van Dieman's Land is an 1830 British musical comedy play by William Thomas Moncrieff. It was set in Tasmania and concerned the bushranger Michael Howe.

The play was acclaimed at the time and is one of the best known early plays set in Australia.
