= Michael Howe (bushranger) =

Australian bushranger

- Born: Pontefract, Yorkshire c.1787
- Died: 21 October 1818; Van Diemen's Land
- Cause of death: Died in struggle
- Other name: Demon Bushranger
- Occupations: Seaman, Bushranger

Details
- Victims: 5+
- Country: Australia
- State: Van Diemen's Land

Michael Howe (1787 – 21 October 1818) was a British convict who became a bushranger and gang leader in Van Diemen's Land (now Tasmania), Australia.

== Early life ==
Howe was born at Pontefract, Yorkshire, England, son of Thomas Howe and his wife Elizabeth. He served two years on a merchant vessel at Hull before deserting to join the navy as a seaman. He later owned his own small craft.

== Transportation ==
On 31 July 1811 he was sentenced to seven years transportation. He arrived in Van Diemen's Land in October 1812 on Indefatigable, and was assigned to John Ingle, a merchant and grazier.

Howe refused the assignment, declaring that "having served the King, he would be no man's slave". He escaped.

== The gang ==
Whitehead begged Howe to cut off his head, and take it, so that it couldn't be taken by his pursuers, and used as evidence to claim the offered reward. Howe complied with the request. During one farm robbery, at Ingle's farm 20 kilometres south of Hobart, Howe's gang 'cruelly abused the person of a female'.

Howe had pleaded ill-health and was allowed to walk freely to a doctor in the company of a constable, and he walked ahead of the constable who was distracted and then made his escape. He quickly fell in with some bushrangers which included some of his old companions in arms. He quickly rose to leader but not without tension, two of the gang having incurred his anger so he made short work of them. At midnight, while both were sleeping Howe crept upon them and cut the throat of one and clubbed the others head in with the stock of his gun.

== Death ==
In October 1817 he was betrayed by one of his own men, George Watson and William Drew a shopkeeper. Howe stabbed Watson, and then taking Watson's gun, shot Drew dead. Watson died weeks later from his wounds.

Worrall later recalled those final minutes when he faced Howe:

We were then about 15 yards from each other... He stared at me with astonishment, and, to tell you the truth, I was a little astonished at him, for he was covered with patches of kangaroo skins, and wore a black beard – a haversack and powder horn slung across his shoulders, I wore my beard also as I do now, and a curious pair we looked. After a moment's pause he cried out, "Black beard against white beard for a million!" and fired; I slapped at him, and I believe hit him, for he staggered, but rallied again, and was clearing the bank between me and him when Pugh ran up, and with the butt end of his firelock knocked him down, jumped after him, and battered his brains out just as he was opening a clasp-knife to defend himself.

He was 31. Howe's head was cut off to take to Hobart, while his body "was left to bleach in the woods". Worrall received a third share of the reward, a pardon from his convict sentence, and free passage back to England.

His bones were interred in the same spot where he met his death, close to the old Shannon hut. Many of the bones appeared above ground, either from the effects of time and weather, or animals of prey, William Patterson, Superintendent of Convicts, took the pains to collect them together, to inter them in a deeper grave, and to distinguish the spot by a large stone and other memorials of the dead.

== Conspiracy ==
Some of the most powerful men in Hobart and Launceston had arrangements with Howe and the most profitable of these partnerships was with the colony's wealthiest man, Edward Lord. Understandings were reached between them. Lord's wife, Maria played a crucial role in this connection. Maria Lord not only ran her husband's affairs in his absence, but as an ex-convict herself, she had the contacts and cultural understanding to negotiate with the bushrangers.

The official investigations into Howe's relationship with Edward Lord and Robert Knopwood did not go far, as no documents from his testimonies have survived. As Carlo Canteri wrote in his Origins of Australian Social Banditry, "...a complete exposure of all the bushrangers, interconnecting linkages would shake Van Diemen's Land to its very rum-cellars."

== Legacy ==
In 1818, T. E. Wells, a cousin of Samuel Marsden, wrote an account of Howe's life and crimes, called The Last and Worst of the Bushrangers of Van Diemen's Land.

Howe's exploits inspired the earliest play about Tasmania. Titled Michael Howe, The Terror of Van Diemen's Land, it used William Wentworth's writings on Australia as its source material, and premiered at The Old Vic in London in 1821. Another early play about Howe was William Thomas Moncrieff's Van Diemen's Land: An Operatic Drama (1830).

Howe is commemorated in two Tasmanian place names: Mike Howes marsh, near Oatlands and a gully on the River Derwent.

There were a number of curious relics of the past eventful life of Michael Howe, it is unknown whether any of these still exist. Dr Robert Espie claimed to have dissected Howe's body and placed his thigh bone in the wall of his house at Sayes Comb, Tasmania. The bone was discovered in 1914. Dr James Ross collected a large iron pot from the place of Howes death and continued to use it. Frank and Philip Pitt had a volume returned that Howe had stolen and the book cover was secured with kangaroo skin and very neatly sewed with sinews. The Campbell Town museum once displayed a photograph of the original letter, written by Michael Howe, to Governor Thomas Davey in 1816, and signed by all the members of the gang.

In 2011, Screen Australia announced that a film called The Outlaw Michael Howe was in development. The film was directed by Brendan Cowell and starred Damon Herriman, Mirrah Foulkes, Rarriwuy Hick, Darren Gilshenan and Matt Day.

The Outlaw Michael Howe aired in Australia on the ABC television network on 1 December 2013 and again for Australia Day week in 2016.

== See also ==
- List of convicts transported to Australia
