= Wot a Night =

1931 film

- Directed by: John Foster; George Stallings
- Produced by: Amadee J. Van Beuren
- Starring: Unknown
- Music by: Gene Rodemich
- Animation by: Jim Tyer (Uncredited)
- Color process: Black and white
- Distributed by: R-K-O Radio Pictures
- Release date: August 1, 1931
- Running time: 8 minutes 19 seconds
- Country: United States
- Language: English

Wot a Night is a 1931 animated film. It is the first film in Van Beuren's Tom and Jerry series, later re-issued as "Dick and Larry".

== Plot ==
In their first film, Tom and Jerry are taxi drivers at the train station on a stormy day, waiting for a fare. A train comes up, and stops with an engine hauling a coach to let off two identical-looking men, who come out, similar to the pair from the Farmer Alfalfa cartoon Wooden Money. They both try to get them in the taxi. After the men are settled, Tom drives the men. It rains so much, a frog jumps in to the taxi and gets back again.

They reach a castle, and as the men walk in, Tom and Jerry run to the men to be paid, but are locked inside. Then, a cloud turns into a human-like figure with arms. He then plays crenellations as piano keys, and while near towers act as pipes, similar to a pipe organ, two trees play their own branches like piccolos. As they walk, Tom is mortified as Jerry is interested as a giant bat-like creature appears in front of them.

They come to a room where a skeleton is cleaning itself. After this point, they are sure that paranormal things are happening. Odd things that happen include: ghosts standing behind them, finding a skeleton playing a piano while another skeleton dances to the music, a glove dancing, and a blackface quartette of skeletons singing a song, which includes a few lines from versions of "Golden Slippers", such as a "long white robe" and a "starry crown", and to stop gambling.

After these things have happened, the two men walk in and point at Jerry. Jerry lifts his shirt, and now realizes that he is a skeleton, too. Tom laughs, and now realizes that he is a skeleton when Jerry lifts his shirt, too. Tom is terrified, and as both men run for their lives, the cartoon ends.

== References in the series ==
- The third part of the blackface skeletons' performance was retooled into "Plane Dumb", a later film in the series.
