= William Thomas Moncrieff =

English dramatist and author

William Thomas Moncrieff (24 August 1794 – 3 December 1857), commonly referred as W. T. Moncrieff, was an English dramatist and author.

== Biography ==
William Thomas Thomas, born in London to a Strand tradesman named Thomas, assumed the name Moncrieff for theatrical purposes. His first success was at Astley's with The Dandy Family (1818), an equestrian drama. His 1819 play, Wanted a Wife; or, a Checque on My Banker, was a comedy that gently ridiculed "lonely heart" ads. The following year, his play The Lear of Private Life, starring Junius Brutus Booth as the lead, enjoyed a long run.

Moncrieff's most popular production was Tom and Jerry, or Life in London (1821), a dramatisation of Life in London by Pierce Egan. Tom and Jerry was an outstanding success, becoming the first play to achieve a run of 100 performances.

He also wrote the romantic melodrama The Cataract of the Ganges; or, The Rajah’s Daughter (1823) for Drury Lane, which featured real horses and a waterfall on stage. This work became popular, with performances at provincial theatres throughout England. In 1830, he conceived the operatic drama Van Dieman's Land, concerning the notorious bushranger Michael Howe.

Besides plays, Moncrieff wrote non-fiction works like The Visitors' New Guide to the Spa of Leamington Priors and Its Vicinity (1818), Excursion to Warwick, and Excursion to Stratford upon Avon (both 1824).

He managed Vauxhall Gardens in 1827 and leased the City Theatre, Milton Street in 1833. His play Samuel Weller, or, The Pickwickians was performed in London in 1837, starring W. J. Hammond as Sam Weller, while Dickens was still writing The Pickwick Papers. In the same year, he had a very public feud with Dickens, over Moncrieff's unauthorised stage adaptation of Dickens' Nicholas Nickleby.

Shortly afterward, Moncrieff's sight failed, and he became totally blind in 1843. The following year, he entered the Charterhouse in London. In 1850, he edited Selections from the Dramatic Works of W. T. M., containing 24 of his own plays. Moncrieff's theatrical reminiscences were published in The Sunday Times in 1851. He died in the Charterhouse in 1857.

== Sources ==
- The New Century Cyclopedia of Names, ed. Clarence L. Barnhart (Appleton-Century-Crofts, New York, 1954). p. 2788
- Gilman, D. C.; Peck, H. T.; Colby, F. M., eds. (1905). "William Thomas Moncrieff". New International Encyclopedia (1st ed.). New York: Dodd, Mead.
- Boase, G. C. "Moncrieff, William Thomas". Dictionary of National Biography (1st ed.). Oxford University Press.
- Parker, John, ed. (1925). Who's Who in the Theatre (fifth ed.). London: Sir Isaac Pitman and Sons. OCLC 10013159.
