= Robert Knopwood =

Australian settler (1763–1838)

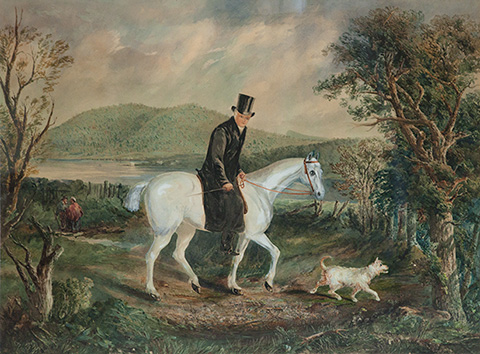
- Born: 2 June 1763; England
- Died: 18 September 1838 (aged 75); Van Diemen's Land
- Occupations: Clergyman; magistrate
- Parents: Robert Knopwood; Elizabeth, née Barton

Robert Knopwood (2 June 1763 – 18 September 1838) was an early clergyman and diarist in Australia.

Knopwood was the third child and only surviving son of Robert Knopwood (from a wealthy Norfolk family) and his wife Elizabeth, née Barton of Threxton, Norfolk, England. Knopwood was educated at Gonville and Caius College, Cambridge, and graduated B.A. in 1786, M.A. in 1790. Knopwood was ordained deacon in December 1788 and priest a year later.

Knopwood sailed aboard HMS Calcutta and was one of the first settlers in colonial Victoria in 1803, where he officiated at the first birth, first marriage, and first death in the Colony; and also served as the Colony's sole magistrate. The settlement lasted just seven months and the party settled in Hobart Town, in Van Diemen's Land from 1804.

== In popular culture ==
- Chris Haywood portrayed Knopwood in the film The Last Confession of Alexander Pearce (2008).
- The Outlaw Michael Howe aired in Australia on the ABC television network on 1 December 2013. Australian actor Matt Day portrayed Knopwood. He is only shown as a settler and magistrate - not a clergyman.

== See also ==
- Ocean, the ship that brought Knopwood from Port Phillip to Hobart
