= Pierce Egan =

British journalist, sportswriter, and writer

Pierce Egan (1772–1849) was a British journalist, sportswriter, and writer on popular culture. His popular book Life in London, published in 1821, was adapted into the stage play Tom and Jerry, or Life in London later that year, which became the first play to have a continuous run of 100 performances in London while at the Adelphi Theatre in the West End.

Coining the term "the Sweet Science" as an epithet for prizefighting — which he dubbed "the Sweet Science of Bruising" as a description of England’s bare-knuckle fight scene, the first volume of his prizefighting articles, Boxiana; or Sketches of Ancient and Modern Pugilism, was published in 1813.

== Life ==
Egan's parents were Irish but he may have been born in the London area. He went into the printing trade, and was a compositor for George Smeeton in 1812. He established himself as the country's leading reporter of sporting events, which at the time meant mainly prize-fights and horse-races.

He died on 3 August 1849 and was buried on 10 August on the western side of Highgate Cemetery, North London. His plot (no.3267) no longer has a headstone or any identifying memorial. The inscription on his grave was published in the book the Monumental Inscriptions of Middlesex Vol 2: "Sacred to the memory of Pierce Egan, Author of several popular works, who died on the 3rd August 1849. Requiescat in Pace", but the year of death is incorrectly recorded as 1840.

== Works ==
In 1814, he wrote, set and printed a book about the relationship between the Prince Regent (later George IV) and Mary Robinson, called The Mistress of Royalty, or the Loves of Florizel and Perdita. However, Egan soon became known for his sporting work. Four volumes of Boxiana; or Sketches of Ancient and Modern Pugilism appeared, lavishly illustrated, between 1813 and 1824. Following a dispute with his publisher, Egan was replaced for the fourth Boxiana volume (replaced by "Jon Bee"), the court permitting Egan continued rights to the title provided he used the New Series prefix. Two volumes of Egan's New Series Boxiana were published in 1828/29.

In 1821, Egan announced the publication of a regular journal: Life in London, appearing monthly at a shilling a time. It was to be illustrated by George Cruikshank (1792–1878), and was dedicated to the king, George IV, who at one time had received Egan at court. The first edition of Life in London or, the Day and Night Scenes of Jerry Hawthorn, esq., and his elegant friend, Corinthian Tom, accompanied by Bob Logic, the Oxonian, in their rambles and sprees through the Metropolis appeared on 15 July 1821.

Egan's creation was an instant success, and was an early favourite of Thackeray's. Pirate versions appeared, featuring such figures as "Bob Tallyho", "Dick Wildfire" and the like. Print-makers speedily knocked off cuts featuring the various "stars" and the real-life public flocked to the "sporting" addresses that Egan had his heroes frequent. There was a translation into French. At least six plays were based on Egan's characters, contributing to yet more sales. One of these was exported to America, launching the Tom and Jerry craze there. The version created by William Thomas Moncrieff was praised as The Beggar's Opera of its day. Moncrieff's production of Tom and Jerry, or Life in London ran continuously at the Adelphi Theatre for two seasons and it was the dramatist's work as much as the author's that did so much to popularise the book's trademark use of fashionable slang. Life in London appeared until 1828, when Egan closed it down.

Egan published a report of the trial of John Thurtell and Joseph Hunt, for the murder of William Weare. Thurtell allegedly mentioned, just seven hours before his execution, that among his final wishes was a desire to read Egan's coverage of a recent prizefight. Egan wrote also satirical legal pieces such as The Fancy Tog's Man versus Young Sadboy, the Milling Quaker.

In 1824, he launched a new journal, Pierce Egan's Life in London and Sporting Guide, a weekly newspaper priced at eightpence-halfpenny. Focusing on crime and sport, this newspaper lasted until November 1827, after which it merged with Bell's Life in London. Other works included sporting anecdotes, theatrical autobiographies, guide-books, and 'fancy ditties'. Among his later efforts, in 1838, was a series of pieces on the delights to be found on and immediately adjacent to the Thames. It was dedicated, with permission, to the young Queen Victoria and featured the illustrative work of his son Pierce Egan the Younger.

In 1823, Egan produced an edition of Francis Grose's Classical Dictionary of the Vulgar Tongue (1785 et seq.), including mainly sporting Regency slang. He also cut the "coarse" and "broad" expressions which Grose had allowed.

The 1788 and 1823 definitions of "Academy, or Pushing School" show the extent of his wish to soften definitions "where propriety pointed out such a course as not only necessary, but, perhaps, essential". However, although he noted in his Preface that some slang terms had developed a different meaning, giving as an example rum—which Grose had defined as "Fine, good, valuable", but which "is now generally used for the very opposite qualities"—Egan allowed Grose's definition to remain in the dictionary itself.

Don Atyeo, author of Blood & Guts: Violence in Sports (1979), wrote that:

Boxiana is riddled with "Fancy" slang: '"Ogles" were blackened, "peepers" plunged into darkness, "tripe-shops" received "staggerers", "ivories" were cracked, "domino boxes" shattered, and "claret" flowed in a steady stream.

And as Egan's character Corinthian Tom explains in Life in London:

A kind of cant phraseology is current from one end of the Metropolis to the other, and you will scarcely be able to move a single step, my dear JERRY, without consulting a Slang Dictionary, or having some friend at your elbow to explain the strange expressions which, at every turn, will assail your ear.

Such a dictionary is what Egan offers, hoping in sum that his efforts work "to improve, and not to degrade mankind; to remove ignorance, and put the UNWARY on their guard; to rouse the sleepy, and to keep them AWAKE; to render those persons who are a little UP, more FLY: and to cause every one to be down to those tricks, manoeuvres and impositions practised in life, which daily cross the paths of both young and old."

== Publications ==
Journals:

- Boxiana
- Life in London

Books:

- Boxiana, vol. 1 (1813)
- Boxiana, vol. 2 (1818)
- Boxiana, vol. 3 (1821)
- Life in London (1821)
- Sporting Anecdotes (1821)
- Life of an Actor (1825)
- Finish to the Adventures of Tom and Jerry (1828)
- New Series Boxiana, vol. 1 (1828)
- New Series Boxiana, vol. 2 (1829)
- Pierce Egan's Book of Sports And Mirror of Life: Embracing the turf, the chase, the ring, and the stage (1832)
- The Pilgrims of the Thames in Search of the National (1838)

Adaptations:

- Life in London was adapted for the stage as Tom and Jerry, or Life in London (1821) and for radio BBC (2006).
