= Sporting man culture =

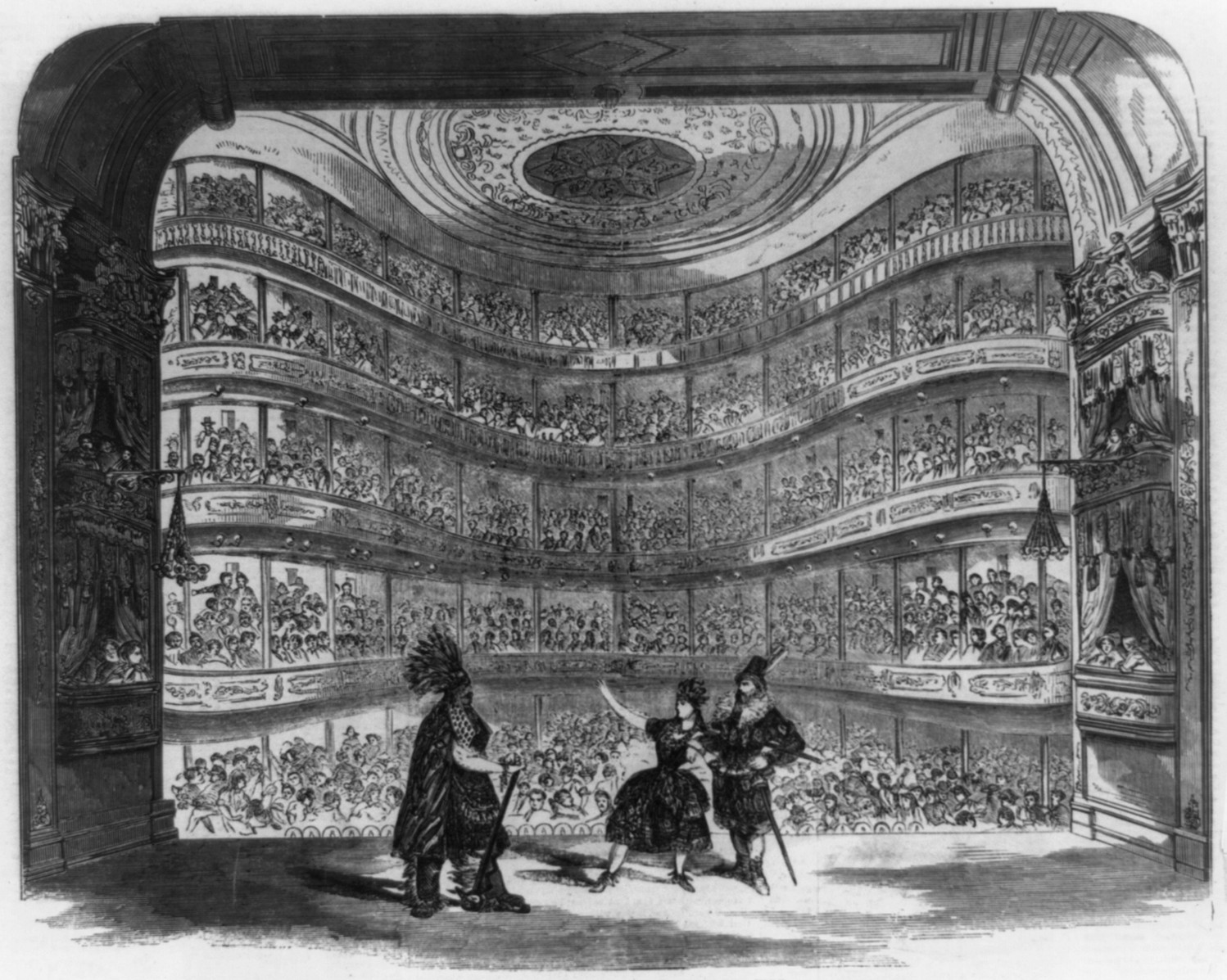
A performance at the Bowery Theatre in New York, 1856

Sporting man culture was an urban bachelor subculture in the mid-19th-century United States, focused on gambling, hedonism, and blood sports. "Sporting" continued to be used in the later 19th century and early 20th century to refer to the world of "vice", particularly prostitution.

Prior to the American Civil War, unmarried young men were drawn to growing cities in the Northeastern United States. Rootless and unsupervised, they created a "sporting" male subculture in the 1830s to 1850s. In New York City, they gambled on cockfights and prizefights, patronized prostitutes and socially proscribed venues including theaters and concert saloons, and at night roamed the streets and monopolized late-night eating places, particularly oyster cellars. In Philadelphia, there was a high level of violence and young men were condemned for their dissolute, tavern-based lives in apparent rejection of family ties. Novels depicted the "sports" as dangerous to public morality; for example George Thompson's Venus in Boston (1849) describes "well dressed libertines" "gaz[ing] with eyes of lustful desire" at working-class women in the night-time streets in Boston.

Published sporting guides and the New York "flash press" provided newcomers with inside knowledge about the subculture; publications by reformers such as the 1831 Magdalen Report in New York inadvertently also supplied information, particularly on locating prostitutes, and condemnatory coverage of "sodomites" in sporting men's publications inadvertently assisted gay men in finding each other.

Particularly in the antebellum South, "sports" were specifically distinguished as white men. Courts used the term "criminal seduction" for sexual assaults and rapes by whites, regardless of violence, reserving charges of violent rape for Black men.

Gambling, racing, and boxing continued to be grouped together under "sporting" in the later 19th century, continuing into the early twentieth century particularly as a euphemism for consorting with prostitutes.
