= Life in London (novel) =

19th-century novel

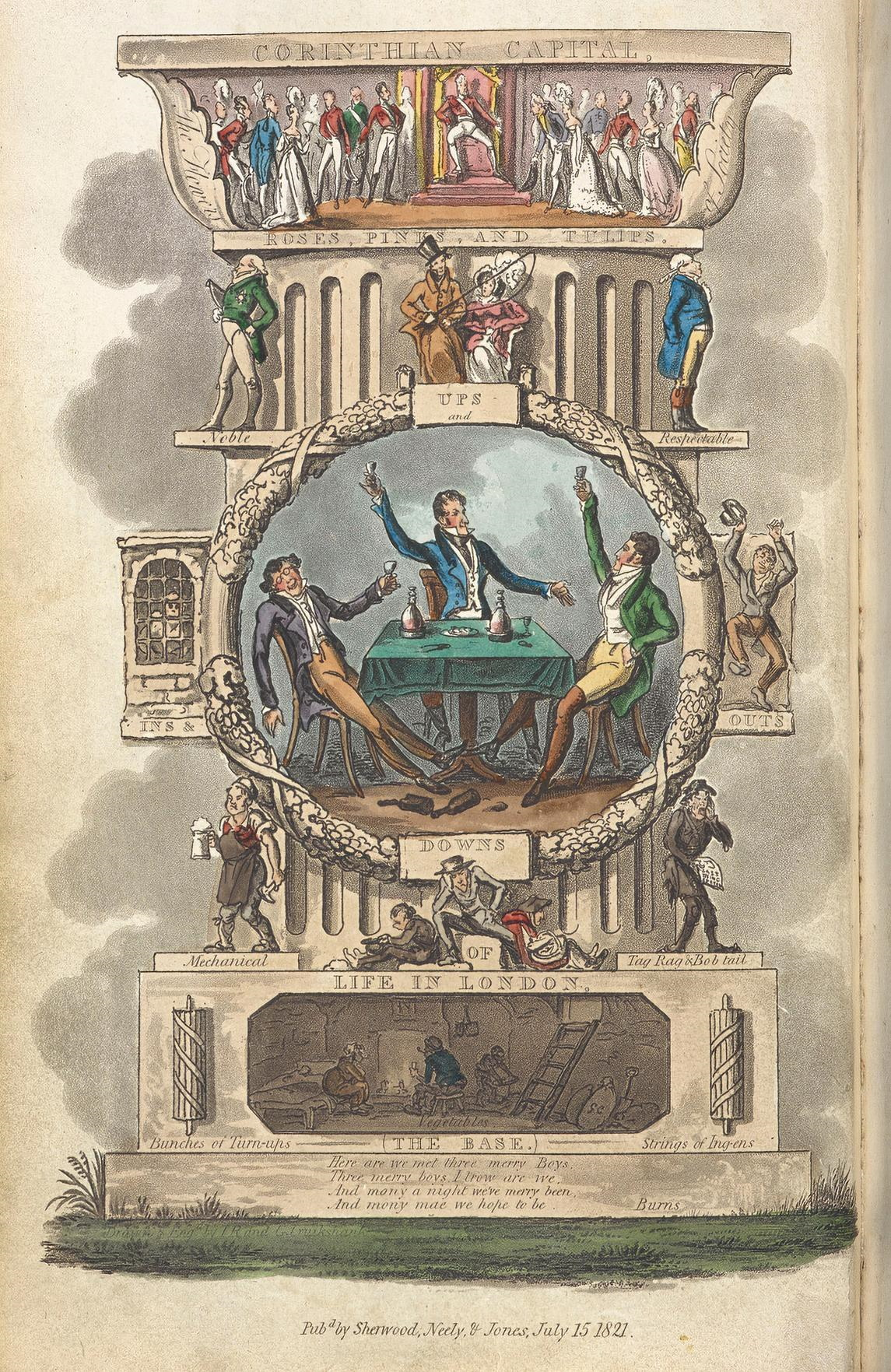
Title page of 1823 edition

Life in London – in full, Life in London; or, The Day and Night Scenes of Jerry Hawthorn, Esq., and his elegant friend, Corinthian Tom, accompanied by Bob Logic, the Oxonian, in their Rambles and Sprees through the Metropolis – is a book by the author and journalist Pierce Egan, first published in 1821. It depicts the progress through London of two young men and their associates, encountering both high and low life. The book has coloured illustrations by George and Robert Cruikshank, which were much admired at the time and subsequently.

The book was first published in monthly instalments, and was an instant success. Several adaptations for the stage followed almost immediately, the most successful of which was Tom and Jerry, or Life in London which ran for a record-breaking 100 performances.

== Background ==
Cruikshank illustrations for Life in London

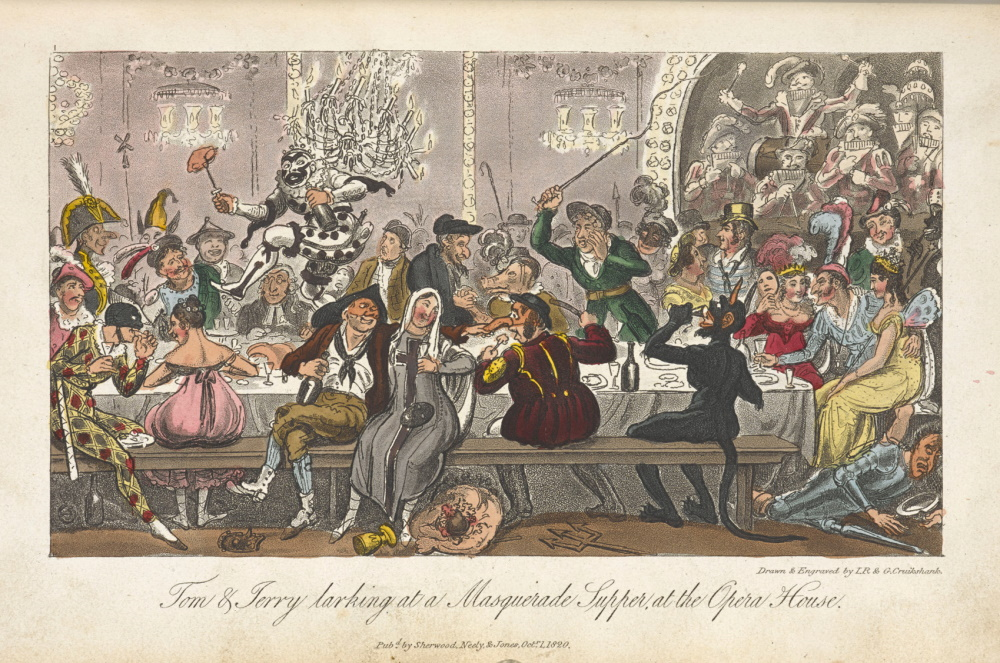
Masquerade supper at the Opera House

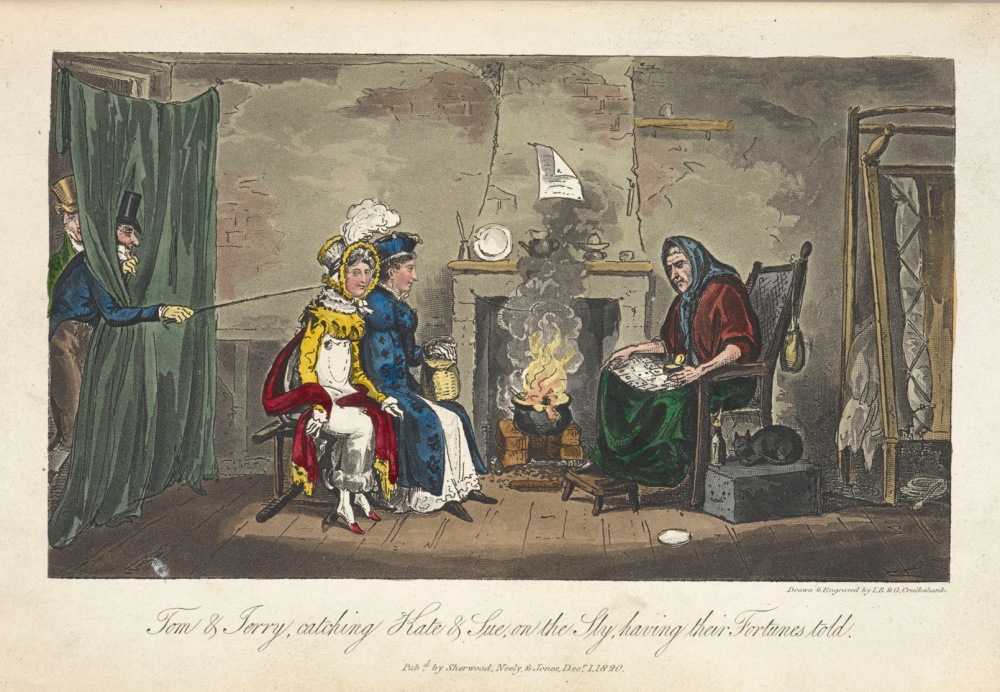
"Tom and Jerry catching Kate and Sue on the sly"

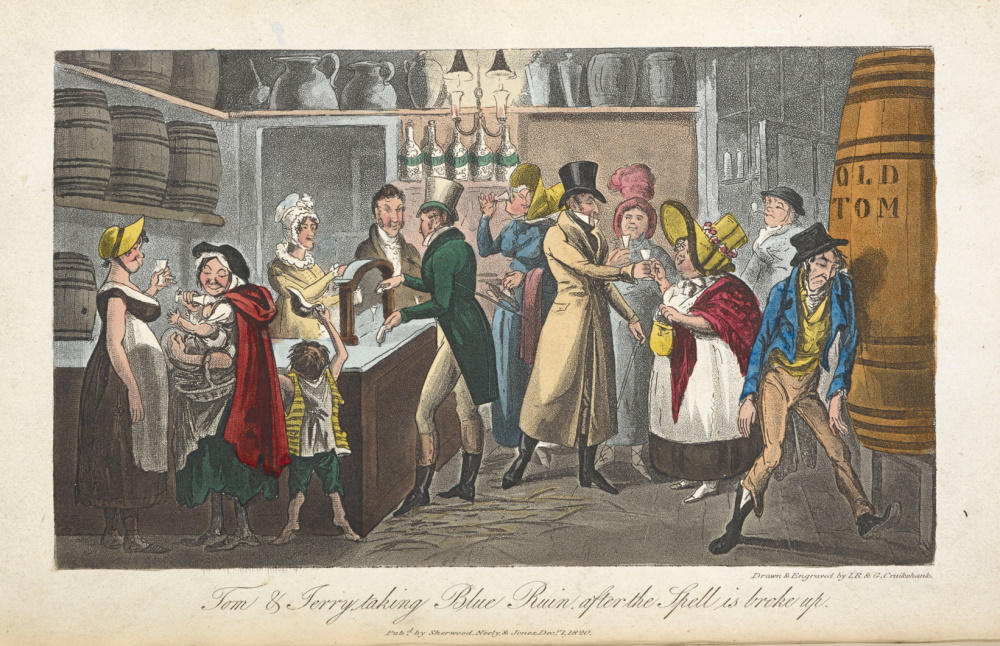
Drinking "blue ruin" (gin)

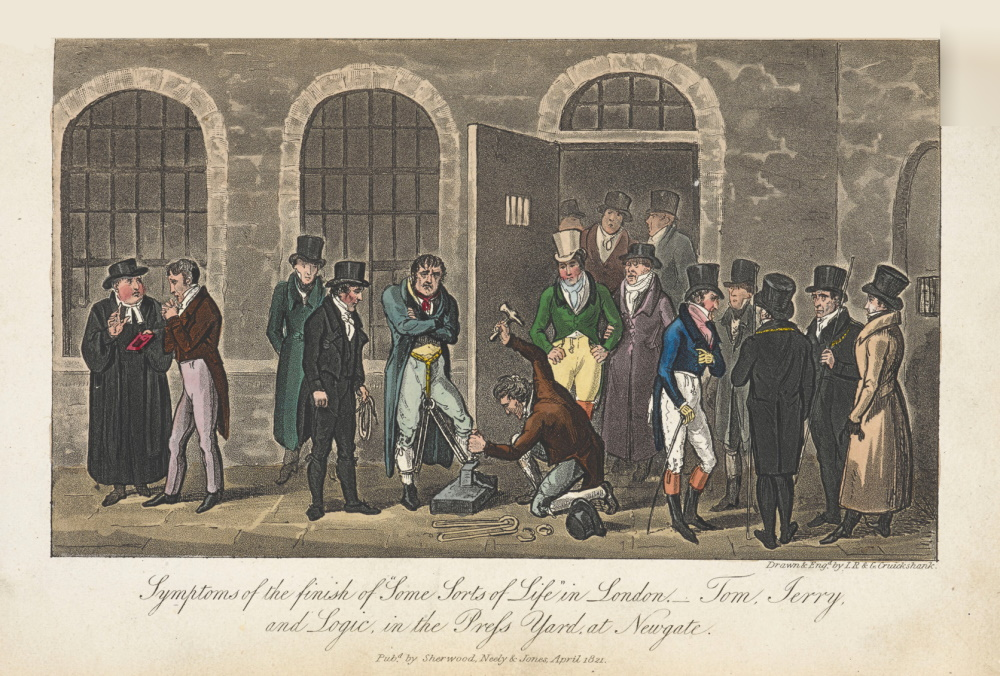
Outside Newgate Prison where a prisoner is being put in irons

Pierce Egan (1772-1849) was a British journalist in the late-18th and early-19th centuries. His two volumes of "Boxiana" – "Sketches of ancient and modern pugilism" – published in 1812 and 1818, established his reputation. According to the Oxford Dictionary of National Biography he virtually created modern sporting journalism – with all its strengths and weaknesses.

Given the great popularity of his accounts of country sports and pastimes, Egan conceived the idea of a similar description of the amusements pursued by sporting men in London. In 1821 he announced the publication of Life in London, in monthly shilling instalments, and recruited the Cruikshank brothers, George (1792-1878) and Robert (1789-1856), to draw and engrave the illustrations, which would be coloured by hand in each copy. King George IV (r. 1820–1830), who knew and liked Egan, accepted the dedication of the forthcoming work, despite having been the target of satirical drawings by George Cruikshank.

== Publication ==
The first number of Life in London; or, The Day and Night Scenes of Jerry Hawthorn, Esq., and his elegant friend, Corinthian Tom, accompanied by Bob Logic, the Oxonian, in their Rambles and Sprees through the Metropolis was published in January 1821, "elegantly printed in Royal Octavo". According to Egan's biographer, J. W. Ebsworth, writing in 1888:

The success was instantaneous and unprecedented. "It took both town and country by storm". So great was the demand for copies, increasing with the publication of each successive number, month by month, that the colourists could not keep pace with the printers. The alternate scenes of high life and low life, the contrasted characters, and revelations of misery side by side with prodigal waste and folly, attracted attention, while the vivacity of dialogue and description never flagged.

The work was published in book form "illustrated with 50 exquisite Engravings" in November 1821, at £1 16s (equivalent to about £150 in 2020 terms).

== Adaptations, plagiarism and riposte ==
The lack of copyright protection at the time meant that the success of the book was seized on by imitators. It was pirated and plagiarised, as in this sixpenny rival publication:

Real Life in London; or, The Rambles and Adventures of Bob Tallyho, Esq., and his cousin, the Hon. Tom Dashall, &c, through the Metropolis. Exhibiting a Living Picture of Fashionable Characters, Manners, and Amusements in High and Low Life. By an Amateur. Embellished and Illustrated with a Series of Coloured Prints, Designed and Engraved by Messrs Heath, Aiken, Dighton, Brooke, Rowlandson, &c.

There were numerous stage adaptations – one by Egan himself – one of which (not Egan's) called Tom and Jerry, staged at the Adelphi Theatre, achieved the distinction of being the first play with a consecutive run of 100 performances in London. (Note: Hitherto, the record for London's longest-running stage work had been held for nearly a century by The Beggar's Opera with a run of 62 performances in 1728.)

Egan returned to the theme in 1828, publishing a riposte to the pirates and plagiarists in the form of his Finish to the Adventures of Tom, Jerry, and Logic, with coloured illustrations by Robert Cruikshank.

== Later history ==
The work did not last well. W. M. Thackeray, who had been enthusiastic about the book as a young man, wrote in 1840:

As for Tom and Jerry, to show the mutability of human affairs, and the evanescent nature of reputation, we have been to the British Museum, and no less than five circulating libraries, in quest of the book, and Life in London, alas! is not to be found at any one of them.

When Thackeray located a copy twenty years later he found it "not so brilliant as I had supposed it to be". He thought the pictures "just as fine as ever" but the writing vulgar and the content "more curious than amusing".

In an article on "The History of Tom and Jerry" in 1870, the theatrical newspaper The Era observed that the Cruikshank illustrations displayed a considerable amount of life and spirit, but the text was "without real humour and striking incident, a mere mass of slang and verbiage".

== Linguistic legacy ==
After the publication of Egan's book and the various theatrical adaptations, the term "Tom and Jerry" entered the English language. The Oxford English Dictionary cites examples of its use – to describe young men given to drinking, gambling, and riotous living – in the US, Australia and Britain throughout the 19th and 20th centuries and into the 21st. In British usage a "Tom and Jerry shop" was a 19th-century term for a small tavern or alehouse – "especially one regarded as disreputable". In American usage the phrase "Tom and Jerry" came to be applied from at latest the 1840s to an alcoholic drink resembling egg nog. The use of the names for the popular cartoon cat and mouse is evidently unconnected with Egan's heroes: the names of the feline and rodent protagonists were chosen from suggestions by hundreds of MGM employees in a competition before the series was launched in 1940.

== See also ==
- London in fiction

== Notes, references and sources ==
=== Sources ===
- Hotten, John Camden (1869). "Introduction". Life in London. London: Hotten. OCLC 1157997103.
- Moncrieff, W. T. (1826). Tom and Jerry: Or, Life In London In 1820. London: Thomas Hailes Lacy. ProQuest 2138577344.
- Parker, John, ed. (1925). Who's Who in the Theatre (fifth ed.). London: Sir Isaac Pitman and Sons. OCLC 10013159.
- Room, Adrian (2000). Brewer's Dictionary of Modern Phrase and Fable. London: Cassell. ISBN 978-0-304-35381-1.
- Thackeray, William Makepeace (1884) [1840]. An Essay on the Genius of George Cruikshank. London: Redway. OCLC 245666196.
