= List of highest-grossing musical films =

The following is a list of highest-grossing musical films of all time, the highest-grossing musical film franchises, the biggest opening weekends for musical films, and the highest admissions at the box office.

== Highest-grossing musical films ==
Note that the following gross figures are nominal, not adjusted for inflation, and do not take into account rising ticket prices, or differences in ticket prices between different countries. When adjusted for inflation, the highest-grossing musical films are The Sound of Music, with an inflation-adjusted worldwide gross of $2,572,000,000; followed by Snow White and the Seven Dwarfs, with an inflation-adjusted worldwide gross of $1,977,000,000 (both as of 2019). (Note: See List of highest-grossing films § Highest-grossing films adjusted for inflation.) The top five films are among the highest-grossing films of all time. 2016 is the most prominent year, with five films total.

† Background shading indicates films playing in the week commencing 6 November 2026 in theaters around the world.

Rank	Film	Year	Gross	Format	Type	Ref
1	The Lion King	2019	$1,656,943,394	Animated	Remake (Note: Uses songs from the original film)	
2	Frozen 2	2019	$1,450,026,933	Animated	Original	
3	Frozen (Note: Box Office Mojo stopped updating its main total for Frozen in August 2014, while it was still in release. The total listed here incorporates subsequent earnings in Japan, Nigeria, Spain, the United Kingdom and Germany up to the end of 2015, but omits earnings in Turkey, Iceland, Brazil, and Australia (2016) which amount to a few hundred thousand dollars. The total is rounded to $1 million to compensate for the numerical inaccuracy.)	2013	$1,290,000,000	Animated	Original	(Note: Frozen: "Frozen (2013) – International Box Office Results". Box Office Mojo. Archived from the original on August 9, 2014. "Worldwide – $1,282,147,791 (total as of August 8, 2014; including Japanese gross up to August 3, Spain gross up to July 27 and omitting Nigerian gross)"; "Frozen (2013) – International Box Office Results: Japan". Box Office Mojo.; Total as of August 3, 2014: $247,650,477 Total as of August 31, 2014: $249,036,646: "Frozen (2013) – International Box Office Results: Spain". Box Office Mojo.; Total as of July 27, 2014: $21,668,593 Total as of November 2, 2014: $22,492,845: "Frozen (2013) – International Box Office Results: Nigeria". Box Office Mojo.; Total as of August 17, 2014: $167,333: "Frozen (2013) – International Box Office Results: United Kingdom". Box Office Mojo.; Total as of June 8, 2014: £39,090,985 Total as of November 30, 2014: £40,960,083 ($1 = £0.63866) Total as of December 7, 2014: £41,087,765 ($1 = £0.64136) Total as of December 14, 2014: £41,170,608 ($1 = £0.636) Total as of November 26, 2017: £42,840,559 ($1 = £0.7497) Total as of December 3, 2017: £42,976,318 ($1 = £0.742): "Frozen (2013) – International Box Office Results: Germany". Box Office Mojo.; Total as of March 30, 2014: €35,098,170 Total as of October 18, 2015: €42,526,744 nb. the exact euro to dollar conversion rate is unknown for earnings since April 2014, but the euro never fell below parity with the dollar during 2014 and 2015 (as can be verified by comparing the exchange rate on the individual date entries at the provided reference) so an approximate conversion rate of €1:$1 is used here to give a lower-bound.)
4	Beauty and the Beast	2017	$1,264,435,322	Live-action	Remake (Note: Uses songs from the original film, as well as some original songs)	
5	Moana 2	2024	$1,059,242,164	Animated	Original	
6	Aladdin	2019	$1,050,693,953	Live-action	Remake (Note: Uses songs from the original film)	
7	Michael	2026	$1,028,703,388	Live-action	Music biopic	
8	The Lion King	1994	$969,587,805	Animated	Original	
9	The Jungle Book	2016	$966,550,600	Live-action	Remake (Note: Uses songs from the Original film)	
10	Bohemian Rhapsody	2018	$910,813,521	Live-action	Music biopic (Note: Featuring songs by Queen.)	
11	Wicked	2024	$758,753,853	Live-action	Adaptation of stage musical	
12	Mufasa: The Lion King	2024	$722,631,756	Animated	Original	
13	Moana	2016	$643,331,111	Animated	Original	
14	Sing	2016	$634,151,679	Animated	Jukebox musical	
15	Wonka	2023	$625,420,096	Live-action	Original	
16	Mamma Mia!	2008	$609,881,238	Live-action	Jukebox musical	
17	Tangled	2010	$591,794,936	Animated	Original	
18	The Little Mermaid	2023	$569,626,289	Live-action	Remake (Note: Uses songs from the Original film as well as some original songs)	
19	Wicked: For Good	2025	$540,807,925	Live-action	Adaptation of stage musical	
20	Aladdin	1992	$504,050,219	Animated	Original	
21	Rio 2	2014	$500,101,972	Animated	Original	
22	Rio	2011	$484,635,760	Animated	Original	
23	Charlie and the Chocolate Factory	2005	$474,968,763	Live-action	Original	
24	La La Land	2016	$471,990,783	Live-action	Original	
25	Tarzan	1999	$448,191,819	Animated	Original	
26	Alvin and the Chipmunks: The Squeakquel	2009	$443,140,005	Live-action	Jukebox musical	
27	Les Misérables	2012	$441,809,770	Live-action	Adaptation of stage musical (Note: Uses song for the Musical)	
28	The Greatest Showman	2017	$434,993,183	Live-action	Original	
29	A Star Is Born	2018	$434,888,866	Live-action	Original	
30	Beauty and the Beast	1991	$424,967,620	Animated	Original	
31	Snow White and the Seven Dwarfs	1937	$418,229,510	Animated	Original	
32	Sing 2	2021	$401,454,720	Animated	Jukebox musical	
33	Grease	1978	$396,169,103	Live-action	Adaptation of stage musical	
34	Mamma Mia: Here We Go Again!	2018	$394,745,881	Live-action	Jukebox musical (Note: Featuring songs by ABBA.)	
35	Happy Feet	2006	$384,335,608	Animated	Jukebox musical	
36	The Jungle Book	1967	$378,000,000	Animated	Original	
37	Sinners	2025	$368,489,632	Live-action	Original	
38	Alvin and the Chipmunks	2007	$361,336,633	Live-action	Jukebox musical	
39	The Lorax	2012	$349,304,366	Animated	Original	
40	Trolls	2016	$347,337,803	Animated	Jukebox musical	
41	Pocahontas	1995	$346,079,773	Animated	Original	
42	Alvin and the Chipmunks: Chipwrecked	2011	$342,695,435	Live-action	Jukebox musical	
43	Enchanted	2007	$340,487,862	Live-action	Original	
44	The Hunchback of Notre Dame	1996	$325,338,851	Animated	Original	
45	Moana	2026	$323,701,468	Live-action	Remake	
46	The Polar Express	2004	$318,226,393	Animated	Original	
47	Chicago	2002	$306,776,732	Live-action	Adaptation of stage musical (Note: Uses songs from the Musical of the same name)	
48	Mulan	1998	$304,320,254	Animated	Original	
49	Pitch Perfect 2	2015	$287,144,079	Live-action	Jukebox musical	
50	The Sound of Music	1965	$286,214,286	Live-action	Adaptation of stage musical	

=== Original musical films ===
Rank	Film	Year	Gross	Format	Ref
1	Frozen II	2019	$1,450,026,933	Animated	
2	Frozen	2013	$1,290,000,000	Animated	
3	Moana 2	2024	$1,059,242,164	Animated	
4	The Lion King	1994	$968,483,777	Animated	
5	Mufasa: The Lion King	2024	$722,631,756	Animated	
6	Moana	2016	$643,331,111	Animated	
7	Wonka	2023	$625,420,096	Live-action	
8	Tangled	2010	$591,794,936	Animated	
9	Aladdin	1992	$504,050,219	Animated	
10	Rio 2	2014	$500,101,972	Animated	
11	Rio	2011	$484,635,760	Animated	
12	Tarzan	1999	$448,191,819	Animated	
13	La La Land	2016	$446,092,357	Live-action	
14	The Greatest Showman	2017	$434,993,183	Live-action	
15	Beauty and the Beast	1991	$424,967,620	Animated	
16	Snow White and the Seven Dwarfs	1937	$418,229,510	Animated	
17	Grease	1978	$396,169,103	Live-action	
18	The Jungle Book	1967	$378,000,000	Animated	
19	Sinners	2025	$368,489,632	Live-action	
20	Mary Poppins Returns	2018	$349,537,494	Live-action	
21	The Lorax	2012	$348,840,316	Animated	
22	Pocahontas	1995	$346,079,773	Animated	
23	Enchanted	2007	$340,487,652	Live-action	
24	The Hunchback of Notre Dame	1996	$325,338,851	Animated	
25	The Polar Express	2004	$314,215,454	Animated	

=== Jukebox musical films ===
Rank	Film	Year	Gross	Format	Source	Ref
1	The Lion King	2019	$1,656,943,394	Animated	Uses songs from the original film	
2	Beauty and the Beast	2017	$1,263,521,126	Live-action	Use songs from the original film	
3	Aladdin	2019	$1,050,693,953	Live-action	Uses songs from the original film	
4	Michael	2026	$1,028,703,388	Live-action	Songs by Michael Jackson	
5	The Jungle Book	2016	$966,550,600	Live-action	Use songs from the original film	
6	Bohemian Rhapsody	2018	$903,655,259	Live-action	Featuring songs by Queen	
7	Wicked	2024	$758,753,853	Live-action	Adaptation of stage musical	
8	Sing	2016	$634,151,679	Animated	Pop songs	
9	Mamma Mia!	2008	$609,881,238	Live-action	Songs from the original musical	
10	The Little Mermaid	2023	$569,626,289	Live-action	Use songs from the original film	
11	Wicked: For Good	2025	$540,334,371	Live-action	Adaptation of stage musical	
12	Charlie and the Chocolate Factory	2005	$474,968,763	Live-action	Uses songs from the original film	
13	Alvin and the Chipmunks: The Squeakquel	2009	$443,140,005	Live-action	Pop songs	
14	Les Misérables	2012	$441,809,770	Live-action	Songs from the original musical	
15	Sing 2	2021	$401,454,720	Animated	Pop songs	
16	Mamma Mia: Here We Go Again!	2018	$394,745,881	Live-action	Featuring songs by ABBA	
17	Happy Feet	2006	$384,335,608	Animated	Pop songs	
18	Alvin and the Chipmunks	2007	$361,336,633	Live-action	Pop songs	
19	Trolls	2016	$346,864,462	Animated	Pop songs	
20	Alvin and the Chipmunks: Chipwrecked	2011	$342,695,435	Live-action	Pop songs	
21	Chicago	2002	$306,776,732	Live-action	Songs from the original musical	
22	Pitch Perfect 2	2015	$287,506,194	Live-action	Pop songs	
23	The Sound of Music	1965	$286,214,286	Live-action	Adaptation of stage musical	

== Box office ticket sales ==
The following table lists known estimated box-office ticket sales for various high-grossing musical films that have sold at least 75 million tickets worldwide.

Note that some of the data are incomplete due to a lack of available admissions data from a number of countries. Therefore, it is not an exhaustive list of all the highest-grossing musical films by ticket sales, so no rankings are given.

Film	Year	Known ticket sales (est.)	Format	Type	Ref
Legend of the White Snake (Bai she zhuan)	1980	700,000,000	Live-action	Adaptation	
Sesame Official (Qi pin zhi ma guan)	1980	500,000,000	Live-action	Adaptation	
Caravan	1971	319,000,000	Live-action	Original	(Note: Caravan admissions: India – 19 million; China – 300 million)
The Sound of Music	1965	283,300,000	Live-action	Original	
The Jungle Book	1967	264,936,054	Animated	Original	(Note: The Jungle Book (1967) admissions: United States and United Kingdom – 220,500,000; Germany – 27,300,000; France, Sweden, Argentina, Spain, Denmark, Austria, Italy, Finland – 17,136,054)
Sholay	1975	250,000,000	Live-action	Original	
The Lion King	2019	227,008,637	Animated	Remake (Note: Uses songs from the original film)	(Note: The Lion King (2019): United States and Canada – 60,322,700; Argentina, Australia, Bolivia, Chile, Colombia, Mexico, Peru, Serbia, Sweden, Switzerland, Ukraine, United Arab Emirates, United Kingdom – 51,829,19; Austria, Belgium, Bosnia and Herzegovina, Bulgaria, Croatia, Cyprus, Czech Republic, Denmark, Estonia, Finland, France, Germany, Greece, Hungary, Iceland, Ireland, Italy, Latvia, Lithuania, Luxembourg, Montenegro, Netherlands, North Macedonia, Norway, Poland, Portugal, Romania, Slovakia, Slovenia – 35,848,975; Brazil and Spain – 22,713,564; China – 22,493,782; Russia – 12,729,733; India – 10,900,000; South Korea – 4,743,295; Japan – 4,660,000; Turkey – 767,390)
Snow White and the Seven Dwarfs	1937	218,491,031	Animated	Original	(Note: Snow White and the Seven Dwarfs: United States – 166,387,000; United Kingdom – 28,000,000; France – 18,353,225; Germany – 4,201,480; Italy – 1,330,316; European re-releases (2001–2022) – 218,888; South Korea – 122)
Awaara (The Vagabond)	1951	217,000,000	Live-action	Original	(Note: Awaara admissions: India – 17 million; China – 100 million; Soviet Union – 100 million)
The Jungle Book	2016	193,700,000	Live-action	Remake (Note: Uses songs from the original film.)	(Note: The Jungle Book (2016) admissions: United States and United Kingdom – 48,300,000; China – 29,209,800; Other European countries and Morocco – 21,277,566; India – 20,000,000; South Korea – 2,537,438; Japan – 1,690,895; Australia – 1,644,551)
Fantasia	1940	182,128,748	Animated	Jukebox musical	
Bohemian Rhapsody	2018	176,500,000	Live-action	Jukebox musical	(Note: Bohemian Rhapsody: Europe – 31,368,291; United States and Canada – 23,974,900; South Korea – 9,948,386; Japan – 9,931,559; China – 2,284,739; Australia – 2,814,671)
The Rocky Horror Picture Show	1975	170,000,000	Live-action	Original	
Aladdin	2019	161,600,000	Live-action	Remake (Note: Uses songs from the original film)	(Note: Aladdin (2019) admissions: United States and Canada – 39,462,000; South Korea – 12,723,777; France, Germany, Spain – 9,737,259; Russia – 5,830,000; Other European countries – 16,637,870; China – 9,006,480; Japan – 8,550,000; Brazil - 4,788,803; India – 3,171,408; Australia – 1,719,352)
Mother India	1957	150,000,000	Live-action	Original	(Note: Mother India admissions: India – 100 million+; France and United Kingdom (2002–2004) – 11,812)
Mughal-e-Azam (The Great Mughal)	1960	150,000,000	Live-action	Original	(Note: Mughal-e-Azam admissions: India – 100 million+; United States and Canada (2005) – 25,200; United Kingdom (2002–2014) – 16,253)
Baahubali 2: The Conclusion	2017	150,000,000	Live-action	Original	(Note: Baahubali 2 admissions: India – 100 million; China – 2,389,945; United States and Canada – 2,255,500; Europe – 257,556; Japan – 100,000)
The Lion King	1994	140,108,836	Animated	Original	(Note: The Lion King (1994): South Korea (Seoul City) – 920,948; Other territories – 139,187,888)
Michael †	2026	137,200,000	Live-action	Jukebox musical	
Disco Dancer	1982	135,000,000	Live-action	Original	(Note: Disco Dancer admissions: India – 15 million; Soviet Union – 120 million)
Frozen	2013	133,013,967	Animated	Original	(Note: Frozen admissions: United States and Canada – 49,041,000; Other territories – 83,972,967)
Beauty and the Beast	2017	123,766,498	Live-action	Remake (Note: Uses songs from the original film)	(Note: Beauty and the Beast (2017) admissions: United States and Canada – 56,798,200; Europe and Morocco – 33,919,225; China – 15,841,104; Japan – 9.5 million; South Korea – 5,138,330; Australia – 2,569,639)
Grease	1978	117,075,584	Live-action	Jukebox musical (Note: Based on the musical of the same name)	
Bobby	1973	116,400,000	Live-action	Original	(Note: Bobby admissions: India – 53.5 million; Soviet Union – 62.9 million)
Mary Poppins	1964	105,507,268	Live-action	Original	(Note: Mary Poppins admissions: United States and Canada – 78,181,800; United Kingdom – 14 million; France, Germany, Spain – 13,325,468)
Muqaddar Ka Sikandar	1978	91,800,000	Live-action	Original	(Note: Muqaddar Ka Sikandar admissions: India – 66.6 million; Soviet Union – 25.2 million)
Aladdin	1992	90,290,784	Animated	Original	(Note: Aladdin (1992) admissions: United States and Canada – 52,442,300; France, Germany, Italy, Spain – 21,074,285; United Kingdom – 8,300,000; Japan – 4,550,835; Australia – 2,753,072; South Korea (Seoul City) – 647,266; Denmark – 522,350; Finland and Switzerland (1996–2015) – 676)
Cinderella	1950	84,458,172	Animated	Original	(Note: Cinderella (1950) admissions: United States and Canada – 60,301,400; France – 13,226,772; United Kingdom and Spain – 10.93 million)
Ganga Jamna	1961	84,100,000	Live-action	Original	(Note: Ganga Jamna admissions: India – 52 million; Soviet Union – 32.1 million)
Pinocchio	1940	83,739,255	Animated	Original	(Note: Pinocchio: United States and Canada – 67,403,300; United Kingdom and France – 16,335,702; Netherlands (1999) – 253)
Mamma Mia! Here We Go Again	2018	76,600,000	Live-action	Jukebox musical	
Kidnapping, Caucasian Style	1967	76,540,000	Live-action	Original	

=== Original ===
Film	Year	Known ticket sales (est.)	Format	Ref
Caravan	1971	319,000,000	Live-action	
The Sound of Music	1965	283,300,000	Live-action	
The Jungle Book	1967	264,936,054	Animated	
Sholay	1975	250,000,000	Live-action	
Snow White and the Seven Dwarfs	1937	218,491,031	Animated	
Awaara (The Vagabond)	1951	217,000,000	Live-action	
Fantasia	1940	182,128,748	Animated	
Mother India	1957	150,000,000	Live-action	
Mughal-e-Azam (The Great Mughal)	1960	150,000,000	Live-action	
Baahubali 2: The Conclusion	2017	150,000,000	Live-action	
The Lion King	1994	140,108,836	Animated	
Disco Dancer	1982	135,000,000	Live-action	
Frozen	2013	133,013,967	Animated	
Bobby	1973	116,400,000	Live-action	
Mary Poppins	1964	105,507,268	Live-action	
Muqaddar Ka Sikandar	1978	91,800,000	Live-action	
Aladdin	1992	90,290,784	Animated	
Cinderella	1950	84,458,172	Animated	
Ganga Jamna	1961	84,100,000	Live-action	
Pinocchio	1940	83,739,255	Animated	
Kidnapping, Caucasian Style	1967	76,540,000	Live-action	

=== Jukebox ===
Film	Year	Ticket sales (est.)	Format	Source	Ref
Legend of the White Snake (Bai she zhuan)	1980	700,000,000	Live-action	Adaptation of Chinese opera	
Sesame Official (Qi pin zhi ma guan)	1980	500,000,000	Live-action	Adaptation of Chinese opera	
The Lion King	2019	227,008,637	Animated	Uses songs from the original film	(Note: The Lion King (2019) admissions: United States and Canada – 59,299,900; China – 21,470,719; France, Germany, Spain – 18,608,061; Russia – 12 million; South Korea – 4,742,514; India – 2,564,572)
The Jungle Book	2016	193,700,000	Live-action	Uses songs from the original film	
Bohemian Rhapsody	2018	176,500,000	Live-action	Featuring songs by Queen	
Aladdin	2019	161,600,000	Live-action	Use songs from the original film	
Michael †	2026	137,200,000	Live-action	Songs by Michael Jackson	
Beauty and the Beast	2017	123,766,498	Live-action	Uses songs from the original film	
Grease	1978	117,075,584	Live-action	Based on musical	
Mamma Mia! Here We Go Again	2018	76,600,000	Live-action	Featuring songs by ABBA	

== Biggest opening weekends ==
The following is a list of the biggest opening weekends for musical films worldwide.

Rank	Film	Year	Opening weekend	Format	Type	Ref
1	Moana 2	2024	$389,300,000	Animated	Original	
2	Frozen 2	2019	$358,503,293	Animated	Original	
3	Beauty and the Beast	2017	$357,026,593	Live-action	Remake (Note: Uses songs from the original film)	
4	The Lion King	2019	$245,953,703	Animated	Remake (Note: Uses songs from the original film)	
5	Aladdin	2019	$234,700,000	Live-action	Remake (Note: Uses songs from the original film)	
6	Wicked: For Good	2025	$223,041,640	Live-action	Adaptation of stage musical	
7	Michael	2026	$218,800,000	Live-action	Music biopic	
8	The Little Mermaid	2023	$164,300,000	Live-action	Remake (Note: Uses songs from the Original film)	
9	Wicked	2024	$164,200,000	Live-action	Adaptation of stage musical	
10	Bohemian Rhapsody	2018	$141,700,000	Live-action	Music biopic	

=== Original musical films ===
The following is a list of the biggest opening weekends for musical films worldwide.

Rank	Film	Year	Opening weekend	Format	Ref
1	Moana 2	2024	$389,300,000	Animated	
2	Frozen 2	2019	$358,503,293	Animated	
3	Mufasa: The Lion King	2026	$122,200,000	Animated	
4	Frozen	2013	$110,600,000	Animated	
5	Rio	2011	$94,164,414	Animated	
6	Pushpa 2: The Rule	2024	$89,000,000	Live-action	
7	Dhurandhar: The Revenge	2026	$79,000,000	Live-action	
8	High School Musical 3: Senior Year	2008	$84,652,689	Live-action	
9	Baahubali 2: The Conclusion	2017	$81,000,000	Live-action	
10	2.0	2018	$76,035,064	Live-action	

=== Jukebox musical films ===
The following is a list of the biggest opening weekends for musical films worldwide.

Rank	Film	Year	Opening	Format	Source	Ref
1	Beauty and the Beast	2017	$357,026,593	Live-action	Songs from the original film	
2	The Lion King	2019	$245,953,703	Animated	Songs from the original film	
3	Aladdin	2019	$234,700,000	Live-action	Songs from the original film	
4	Michael	2026	$218,800,000	Live-action	Songs by Michael Jackson	
5	The Little Mermaid	2023	$164,300,000	Live-action	Songs from the original film	
6	Bohemian Rhapsody	2018	$141,700,000	Live-action	Featuring songs by Queen	
7	The Jungle Book	2016	$132,200,000	Live-action	Songs from the original film	
8	Mamma Mia! Here We Go Again	2018	$77,852,180	Live-action	Featuring songs by ABBA	
9	Alvin and the Chipmunks: The Squeakquel	2009	$72,362,847	Live-action	Pop songs	
10	Straight Outta Compton	2015	$60,200,180	Live-action	Featuring songs by N.W.A	

== Timeline of gross records ==
=== Highest-grossing musical films ===
Year	Title	Record-setting gross	Format	Type	Ref
1927	The Jazz Singer	$2,625,000^{R}	Live-action	Original	
1928	The Singing Fool	$5,916,000^{R}	Live-action	Jukebox (Note: Uses pop culture songs)	
1938	Snow White and the Seven Dwarfs (Note: Snow White earned over $8 million in gross rentals by the end of 1938, in the process becoming the highest-grossing sound film.)	$8,000,000^{R}	Animated	Original	(Note: Block & Wilson 2010, p. 237: "By the end of 1938, it had grossed more than $8 million in worldwide rentals and was ranked at the time as the second-highest-grossing film after the 1925 epic Ben-Hur".)
1940	Snow White and the Seven Dwarfs	$8,500,000^{R}	Animated	Original	
1946	This Is the Army	$8,500,000^{*}^{R}	Live-action	Adaptation (Note: Based on the musical of the same name)	
1951	This Is the Army	$10,445,000^{R}	Live-action	Adaptation	
1954	White Christmas	$12,000,000^{*}^{R}	Live-action	Original	
1954	Awaara (The Vagabond)	$12,100,000	Live-action	Original	(Note: See Awaara § Box office)
1955	Awaara (The Vagabond)	$13,200,000	Live-action	Original	(Note: See Awaara § Box office)
1957	Mother India	$17,000,000 ^{I}	Live-action	Original	
1960	Mughal-e-Azam (The Great Mughal)	$24,000,000 ^{I}	Live-action	Original	
1960	White Christmas	$30,000,000^{*}	Live-action	Original	
1961	South Pacific	$30,000,000^{R}	Live-action	Adaptation (Note: based on the musical of the same name)	"
1961	West Side Story	$31,800,000^{R}	Live-action	Adaptation (Note: Based on the musical of the same name)	(Note: Block & Wilson 2010, p. 434.: The Sound of Music: "Domestic Rentals: $68.4; Foreign Rentals: $46.2; Production Cost: $8.0 (Initial Release – Unadjusted $s in Millions of $s)."; West Side Story: "Domestic Rentals: $16.2; Foreign Rentals: $15.6; Production Cost: $7.0 (Initial Release – Unadjusted $s in Millions of $s).")
1966	Fantasia	$42,853,563	Animated	Jukebox	
1966	Mary Poppins	$44,000,000–$50,000,000^{R}	Live-action	Original	
1966	The Sound of Music	$125,000,000	Live-action	Adaptation (Note: Based on the musical of the same name)	
1978	The Sound of Music	$286,214,076	Live-action	Adaptation	
1978	Grease	$341,000,000	Live-action	Adaptation	
1993	Snow White and the Seven Dwarfs	$418,200,000	Animated	Original	(Note: Snow White and the Seven Dwarfs: Total prior to 50th anniversary reissue: Culhane, John (July 12, 1987). "'Snow White' At 50: Undimmed Magic". The New York Times. "By now, it has grossed about $330 million worldwide – so it remains one of the most popular films ever made."; 1987 and 1993 grosses from North America: "Snow White and the Seven Dwarfs – Releases". Box Office Mojo. "1987 release – $46,594,212; 1993 release – $41,634,471")
1993	Aladdin (Note: It is possible Aladdin never took the record. Aladdin's release (1992–93) coincided with a Snow White reissue, and it is possible that Snow White ended up grossing more. Snow White had grossed a total of $330 million up to 1987, and then added a further $88 million in North America from its 1987 and 1993 reissues; it is unknown how much Snow White made from these reissues outside of North America, but if the foreign gross matched or exceeded the North American gross then Snow White would have earned more.)	$504,050,219	Animated	Original	(Note: Block & Wilson 2010, pp. 712–713.: Bambi: "Worldwide Box Office: $266.8; Production Cost: $1.7 (Millions of $s)"; 101 Dalmatians: "Worldwide Box Office: $215.0; Production Cost: $3.6 (Millions of $s)"; The Jungle Book: "Worldwide Box Office: $170.8"; Production Cost: $3.9 (Millions of $s)"; Aladdin: "Worldwide Box Office: $505.1"; Production Cost: $28.0 (Millions of $s)")
1994	The Lion King	$768,000,000	Animated	Original	
2002	The Lion King	$783,841,776	Animated	Original	
2011	The Lion King	$968,483,777	Animated	Original	
2014	Frozen	$1,287,000,000	Animated	Original	
2017	Frozen	$1,290,000,000	Animated	Original	
2019	The Lion King	$1,656,943,394	Animated	Remake (Note: a remake of the Original film)	

^{R} Distributor rentals. (Note: The gross rental is the distributor's share of the box-office gross and was more commonly reported than the exhibition gross up to the 1970s.)
^{*} US and Canada gross only.
^{I} India gross only.

=== Opening weekends ===
Title	Year	Record-setting gross	Format	Type	Ref
Awaara (The Vagabond)	1955	$114,000 ^{C} ^{R}	Live-action	Original	
Mughal-e-Azam (The Great Mughal)	1960	$860,000 ^{I} ^{R}	Live-action	Original	
Saturday Night Fever	1977	$3,878,099^{*}	Live-action	Original	
Grease	1978	$8,941,717^{*}	Live-action	Original	
The Best Little Whorehouse in Texas	1982	$11,874,268^{*}	Live-action	Adaptation of stage musical (Note: Based on the musical of the same name)	
Staying Alive	1983	$12,146,143^{*}	Live-action	Jukebox	
Aladdin	1992	$25,784,522^{*}	Animated	Original	
The Lion King	1994	$40,888,194	Animated	Original	
Charlie and the Chocolate Factory	2005	$56,178,450	Live-action	Remake (Note: Uses songs from the Original film)	
High School Musical 3: Senior Year	2008	$84,652,689	Live-action	Original	
Rio	2011	$94,164,414	Animated	Original	
Frozen	2013	$110,600,000	Animated	Original	
The Jungle Book	2016	$132,200,000	Live-action	Remake (Note: Uses songs from the original film)	
Beauty and the Beast	2017	$357,026,593	Live-action	Remake (Note: Uses songs from the original film)	
Frozen 2	2019	$358,503,293	Animated	Original	
Moana 2	2024	$389,300,000	Animated	Original	

^{R} Distributor rentals.
^{*} US and Canada gross only.
^{I} India gross only.
^{C} China gross only.

== Highest-grossing musicals by year ==
The following is a list of highest-grossing musical film by year. Disney tops the list 29 times. All films in the Saturday Night Fever, Beauty and the Beast, The Lion King, Rio and The Little Mermaid franchises are on the list; along with Alvin and the Chipmunks, they are the most represented franchises, each with at least two films on the list.

Year	Title	Worldwide gross	Budget	Type	Ref
1927	The Jazz Singer	$2,600,000	$422,000	Original	
1928	The Singing Fool	$5,916,000	$388,000	Original	
1929	Gold Diggers of Broadway	$3,967,000	$532,000	Original	
1930	Animal Crackers	$3,100,000^{R}	?	Original	
1931	Cracked Nuts	$617,000	$261,000	Original	
1932	The Kid from Spain	$2,621,000	?	Original	
1933	Gold Diggers of 1933	$3,231,000^{R}	$433,000	Original	
1934	One Night of Love	$2,500,000^{R}	$500,000	Original	
1935	Naughty Marietta	$2,100,000	$782,000	Original	
1936	San Francisco	$5,300,000	$1,300,000	Original	
1937	Snow White and the Seven Dwarfs	$418,200,000 ($8,000,000)^{R}	$1,488,423	Original	
1938	Alexander's Ragtime Band	$3,600,000	$1,200,000–$2,275,000	Jukebox musical	
1939	The Wizard of Oz	$25,637,669	$2,800,000	Original	
1940	Fantasia	$83,320,832	$2,280,000	Jukebox musical	
1943	This Is the Army	$10,445,000^{R} ($8,500,000)^{*}	?	Adaptation of stage musical (Note: Based on the musical of the same name.)	
1948	The Red Shoes	$5,000,000	$1,500,000	Original	
1951	Awaara (The Vagabond)	$30,660,000 ($4,830,000)^{I}	?	Original	
1952	Aan (The Savage Princess)	$6,042,410 ($5,880,000)^{I}	?	Original	(Note: See Aan § Box office)
1953	Peter Pan	$145,000,000 ($7,000,000)	$3,000,000–4,000,000	Original	(Note: "Peter Pan (1953) – Notes". Turner Classic Movies.)
1954	White Christmas	$30,000,000 ($12,000,000)^{*}^{R}	?	Original	
1955	Oklahoma!	$7,100,000^{R}^{*}	$6,800,000	Original	
1955	Guys and Dolls	$9,063,000^{R}	$5,500,000	Adaptation of stage musical (Note: based on the musical of the samename)	
1955	Shree 420 (Mr. 420)	$10,380,000 ($8,190,000)^{I}	?	Original	(Note: See Shree 420 § Box office)
1955	Lady and the Tramp	$187,000,000 ($6,500,000)^{*}^{R}	$4,000,000	Original	
1956	The King and I	$21,300,000^{*}	$4,550,000	Adaptation of stage musical (Note: based on the musical of the same name)	(Note: Solomon, Aubrey. Twentieth Century Fox: A Corporate and Financial History (The Scarecrow Filmmakers Series). Lanham, Maryland: Scarecrow Press, 1989. ISBN 978-0-8108-4244-1. p249) (Note: Box Office Information for The King and I. The Numbers. Retrieved September 15, 2019.)
1957	Mother India	$17,000,000 ^{I}	$1,300,000	Original	
1958	South Pacific	$30,000,000^{R} ($6,400,000)^{*}	$5,610,000	Adaptation of stage musical. (Note: Based on musical of the same name)	
1959	Sleeping Beauty	$51,600,000^{*} ($5,300,000)^{R}	$6,000,000	Original	
1960	Mughal-e-Azam (The Great Mughal)	$24,000,000 ^{I}	$2,250,000	Music biopic	
1961	West Side Story	$31,800,000^{R}	$7,000,000	Adaptation of stage musical (Note: Based on based on the musical of the same name)	
1962	The Music Man	$14,953,846^{*}	?	Adaptation of stage musical (Note: based on the Musical of the same name)	
1963	The Sword in the Stone	$22,182,353^{*}^{R} ($13,050,777)^{*}^{R}	$3,000,000	Original	(Note: "Big Rental Pictures of 1964", Variety, January 6, 1965, p 39.)
1964	Mary Poppins	$102,272,727^{*} ($30,000,000)^{R}	$4,400,000–$4,600,000	Original	
1965	The Sound of Music	$286,214,076 ($20,000,000)^{*}^{R}	$8,000,000	Adaptation of stage musical (Note: The based on the musical of the same name)	
1966	Phool Aur Patthar	$24,680,000	?	Original	(Note: Phool Aur Patthar box office revenue: India – ₹75 million ($11.79 million); Soviet Union – 11.6 million Rbls ($12.89 million))
1967	The Jungle Book	$378,000,000 ($23,800,000)^{R}	$4,000,000	Original	
1968	Funny Girl	$52,226,499^{*}	$14,100,000	Adaptation of stage musical (Note: Based on the musical of the same name)	
1969	Paint Your Wagon	$31,700,000^{*}	$20,000,000	Adaptation of stage musical (Note: Based on the musical of the same name)	
1970	The Aristocats	$191,000,000 ($26,462,000)^{R}	$4,000,000	Original	
1970	Hello Dolly!	$26,000,000^{R}	$25,000,000	Adaptation of stage musical (Note: based on the musical of the same name)	
1971	Fiddler on the Roof	$83,387,607	$9,000,000	Adaptation of stage musical (Note: based on the musical of the same name)	
1972	Cabaret	$41,326,446	$2,300,000	Adaptation of stage musical (Note: Based on the Musical of the same name)	
1973	Bobby	$39,000,000	?	Original	
1974	That's Entertainment!	$26,890,200	?	Jukebox musical (Note: Uses songs for MGM films)	
1975	The Rocky Horror Picture Show	$112,892,319	$1,400,000	Adaptation of stage musical (Note: Based on the musical of the same name)	
1976	A Star is Born	$80,000,000	$6,000,000	Remake (Note: a remake of the film of the same name)	
1977	Saturday Night Fever	$282,400,000	$3,500,000	Jukebox musical (Note: Uses pop songs)	
1978	Grease	$395,452,066 ($341,000,000)	$6,000,000	Original	
1979	The Muppet Movie	$76,657,000 ($65,000,000)^{*}	$8,000,000	Original	
1980	The Blues Brothers	$115,229,890	$30,000,000	Jukebox musical (Note: Uses pop songs)	
1981	The Fox and the Hound	$63,456,988^{*} ($39,900,000)^{*}	$12,000,000	Original	
1982	Disco Dancer	$105,000,000	$2,000,000	Original	
1983	Staying Alive	$64,892,670	$22,000,000	Jukebox musical (Note: Uses pop songs)	
1984	Amadeus	$90,000,000	$18,000,000	Music biopic	
1985	Ram Teri Ganga Maili	$15,400,000 ^{I}	?	Original	
1986	Little Shop of Horrors	$38,982,260	$25,000,000	Adaptation of stage musical (Note: Based on the musical of the same name)	
1987	Dirty Dancing	$214,577,242	$6,000,000	Original	
1988	Oliver and Company	$121,000,000+ ($100,000,000)+	$31,000,000	Original	
1989	The Little Mermaid	$233,000,000 ($84,355,863)^{*}	$40,000,000	Original	(Note: Stewart, James B. (2005). DisneyWar, p. 104. ISBN 0-684-80993-1. Simon & Schuster. Retrieved August 4, 2014.)
1990	Dil	$10,300,000 ^{I}	?	Original	
1991	Beauty and the Beast	$424,967,620 ($351,863,363)	$25,000,000	Original	
1992	Aladdin	$504,050,219	$28,000,000	Original	
1993	The Nightmare Before Christmas	$81,877,069 ($50,003,043)^{*}	$18,000,000	Original	
1994	The Lion King	$969,587,805 ($766,964,132)	$45,000,000	Original	(Note: The Lion King: Total: "The Lion King (1994)". Box Office Mojo. "Worldwide: $968,483,777; Production Budget: $45 million"; IMAX release (2002): "The Lion King (IMAX)". Box Office Mojo. "North America: $15,686,215; Overseas: $1,191,429"; Total prior to 3D release (2011): "The Lion King (1994)". Box Office Mojo. Archived from the original on June 23, 2011. "$783,841,776"; As of 2010: Block & Wilson 2010, p. 764. "Production Cost: $79.3 (Unadjusted $s in Millions of $s).")
1995	Pocahontas	$346,079,773	$55,000,000	Original	
1996	The Hunchback of Notre Dame	$325,338,851	$100,000,000	Original	
1997	Hercules	$252,712,101	$85,000,000	Original	
1998	Mulan	$304,320,254	$90,000,000	Original	
1999	Tarzan	$448,191,819	$130,000,000	Original	
2000	Coyote Ugly	$113,916,474	$45,000,000	Original	
2001	Moulin Rouge!	$179,213,434	$50,000,000	Jukebox musical	
2002	Chicago	$306,776,732	$45,000,000	Adaptation of stage musical (Note: Based on the musical sound of the same name)	
2003	Brother Bear	$250,397,798	$46,000,000	Original	
2004	The Polar Express	$314,215,454 ($286,000,505)	$165,000,000	Original	
2005	Charlie and the Chocolate Factory	$474,968,763	$150,000,000	Remake	
2006	Happy Feet	$384,335,608	$100,000,000	Jukebox musical (Note: Uses pop songs)	
2007	Alvin and the Chipmunks	$361,336,633	$60,000,000	Jukebox musical	
2008	Mamma Mia!	$609,881,238	$52,000,000	Jukebox musical (Note: Uses songs from the Musical of the same name)	
2009	Alvin and the Chipmunks: The Squeakquel	$443,140,005	$75,000,000	Jukebox musical (Note: Uses pop songs)	
2010	Tangled	$591,794,936	$260,000,000	Original	
2011	Rio	$484,635,760	$90,000,000	Original	
2012	Les Misérables	$441,809,770	$61,000,000	Adaptation of stage musical (Note: Uses songs from the musical of the same name)	
2013	Frozen	$1,290,000,000 ($1,287,000,000)	$150,000,000	Original	
2014	Rio 2	$500,101,972	$103,000,000	Original	
2015	Pitch Perfect 2	$287,144,079	$29,000,000	Jukebox musical (Note: Uses pop songs)	
2016	The Jungle Book	$966,550,600	$175,000,000	Remake (Note: Uses songs from the Original film)	
2017	Beauty and the Beast	$1,263,521,126	$160,000,000	Remake (Note: Uses songs from the Original film)	
2018	Bohemian Rhapsody	$903,655,259	$52,000,000	Jukebox musical (Note: Uses songs released by Queen)	
2019	The Lion King	$1,656,943,394	$260,000,000	Remake (Note: Uses songs from the Original film)	
2020	Tanhaji	$50,000,000	$23,000,000	Original	
2021	Encanto	$252,423,364	$150,000,000	Original	
2022	Elvis	$288,670,284 ($287,740,048)	$85,000,000	Jukebox musical (Note: Featuring songs by Elvis.)	
2023	Wonka	$632,302,312	$125,000,000	Original	
2024	Moana 2	$1,059,242,164	$150,000,000	Original	
2025	Wicked: For Good	$540,807,925	$150,000,000	Adaptation of stage musical	
2026	Michael	$1,028,703,388	$155,000,000	Music biopic	

- ( ... ) Since grosses are not limited to original theatrical runs, a film's first-run gross is included in brackets after the total if known.
- ^{*} US and Canada gross only.
- ^{I} India gross only.
- ^{R} Distributor rentals.
- ^{TBD} To be determined.

== Highest-grossing film franchises ==
Note that the following gross figures are nominal, not adjusted for inflation, and do not take into account increasing ticket prices.

A series must have at least two theatrically released films. The Lion King sits top grossing $3.36 billion, while Frozen has the best average with $1.37 billion per film and is the only franchise where every film has grossed $1 billion.

Highest-grossing musical film franchises and film series^{[§]} (the films in each franchise can be viewed by selecting "show")

Rank	Series	Total worldwide box office	No. of films	Average of films	Highest-grossing film

1
The Lion King
$3,359,001,974
4
$839,750,494
The Lion King (2019) ($1,656,943,394)

	CGI animated series	$2,380,004,376	2	$1,190,002,188	The Lion King (2019) ($1,656,943,394)
1	The Lion King (2019)	$1,656,943,394			
2	Mufasa (2024)	$723,060,982			

	Traditionally animated series	$978,997,598	2	$489,498,799	The Lion King (1994) ($978,996,133)
1	The Lion King (1994)	$978,996,133			
2	Hakuna Matata (2004)	$1,465			

2	Frozen	$2,740,026,933	2	$1,370,013,467	Frozen II ($1,450,026,933)
1	Frozen II (2019)	$1,450,026,933			
2	Frozen (2013)	$1,290,000,000			

3
Moana
$2,026,276,099
3
$675,425,366
Moana 2 ($1,059,242,164)

	Animated series	$1,702,574,631	2	$851,287,316	Moana 2 ($1,059,242,164)
1	Moana 2 (2024)	$1,059,242,164			
2	Moana (2016)	$643,332,467			

Moana (2016)	$323,701,468

4	Beauty and the Beast	$1,688,488,746	2	$844,244,373	Beauty and the Beast (2017) ($1,263,521,126)
1	Beauty and the Beast (2017)	$1,263,521,126			
2	Beauty and the Beast (1991)	$424,967,620			

5	Aladdin	$1,554,744,172	2	$777,372,086	Aladdin (2019) ($1,050,693,953)
1	Aladdin (2019)	$1,050,693,953			
2	Aladdin (1992)	$504,050,219			

6
The Jungle Book
$1,530,854,359
3
$510,284,786
The Jungle Book (2016) ($966,550,600)

The Jungle Book (2016)	$966,550,600

	Animated series	$513,703,599	2	$256,851,800	The Jungle Book ($378,000,000)
1	The Jungle Book (1967)	$378,000,000			
2	The Jungle Book 2 (2003)	$135,703,599			

7
Alvin and the Chipmunks
$1,388,775,021
5
$277,755,004
Chipwrecked ($443,140,005)

	Hybrid series	$1,381,970,709	4	$345,492,677	Chipwrecked ($443,140,005)
1	Chipwrecked (2011)	$443,140,005			
2	Alvin and the Chipmunks (2007)	$361,336,633			
3	The Squeakquel (2009)	$342,695,435			
4	The Road Chip (2015)	$234,798,636			

The Chipmunk Adventure (1987)	$6,804,312

8	Wicked	$1,299,561,778	2	$649,780,889	Wicked ($758,737,211)
1	Wicked (2024)	$758,753,853			
2	For Good (2025) †	$540,807,925			

9	Mamma Mia!	$1,004,627,119	2	$502,313,560	Mamma Mia! ($609,881,238)
1	Mamma Mia! (2008)	$609,881,238			
2	Here We Go Again! (2018)	$394,745,881			

10	Rio	$984,737,732	2	$492,368,866	Rio 2 ($500,101,972)
1	Rio 2 (2014)	$500,101,972			
2	Rio (2011)	$484,635,760			

11	The Little Mermaid	$780,969,768	2	$390,484,884	The Little Mermaid (2023) ($569,626,289)
1	The Little Mermaid (2023)	$569,626,289			
2	The Little Mermaid (1989)	$211,343,479			

12	Snow White	$623,879,463	2	$311,939,732	Snow White and the Seven Dwarfs ($418,200,000)
1	Snow White and the Seven Dwarfs (1937)	$418,200,000			
2	Snow White (2025)	$205,679,463			

13	Trolls	$603,712,862	3	$201,237,621	Trolls ($346,864,462)
1	Trolls (2016)	$346,864,462			
2	Band Together (2023)	$207,571,582			
3	World Tour (2020)	$49,276,818			

14	Pitch Perfect	$588,256,965	3	$196,085,655	Pitch Perfect 2 ($287,506,194)
1	Pitch Perfect 2 (2015)	$287,506,194			
2	Pitch Perfect 3 (2017)	$185,400,345			
3	Pitch Perfect (2012)	$115,350,426			

15	Happy Feet	$534,742,074	2	$267,371,037	Happy Feet ($384,335,608)
1	Happy Feet (2006)	$384,335,608			
2	Happy Feet Two (2011)	$150,406,466			

16	A Star Is Born	$522,988,866	4	$130,747,217	A Star Is Born (2018) ($434,888,866)
1	A Star Is Born (2018)	$434,888,866			
2	A Star Is Born (1976)	$80,000,000			
3	A Star Is Born (1954)	$6,100,000			
4	A Star Is Born (1937)	$2,000,000			

17	The Muppets	$462,897,991	8	$57,862,249	The Muppets ($165,184,237)
1	The Muppets (2011)	$165,184,237			
2	Muppets Most Wanted (2014)	$80,383,290			
3	The Muppet Movie (1979)	$76,657,000			
4	Treasure Island (1996)	$34,327,391			
5	The Great Muppet Caper (1981)	$31,206,251			
6	The Muppet Christmas Carol (1992)	$27,281,507			
7	Take Manhattan (1984)	$25,534,703			
8	Muppets from Space (1999)	$22,323,612			

18	YRF Spy Universe	$448,021,257	7	$64,003,037	Pathaan ($126,887,706)
1	Pathaan (2023)	$126,887,706			
2	Tiger Zinda Hai (2017)	$86,607,209			
3	War (2019)	$67,540,184			
4	Ek Tha Tiger (2012)	$62,689,941			
5	Tiger 3 (2023)	$56,363,265			
6	War 2 (2025)	$37,722,468			
7	Alpha (2026)	$10,210,484			

19	Mary Poppins	$451,810,221	2	$225,905,111	Mary Poppins Returns ($349,537,494)
1	Mary Poppins Returns (2018)	$349,537,494			
2	Mary Poppins (1963)	$102,272,727			

20	Grease	$411,340,579	2	$205,670,290	Grease ($396,169,103)
1	Grease (1978)	$396,169,103			
2	Grease 2 (1982)	$15,171,476			

== See also ==
- Lists of musicals
- List of highest-grossing musical theatre productions
- List of highest-grossing films
  - List of highest-grossing Indian films
  - List of highest-grossing non-English films
- List of multimedia franchises
  - List of highest-grossing media franchises
- Long-running theatre productions
  - Broadway shows
  - West End shows
