= Lists of musicals =

The following are lists of musicals, including musical theatre and musical films.

== Musical theatre lists ==
- List of highest-grossing musical theatre productions
- List of the longest-running Broadway shows
- List of the longest-running West End shows
- List of musicals: A to L
- List of musicals: M to Z
- List of musicals by composer: A to L
- List of musicals by composer: M to Z
- List of musicals filmed live on stage
- List of rock musicals
- List of stage jukebox musicals
- List of the shortest-running Broadway shows
- List of Tony and Olivier Award–winning musicals
- Long-running musical theatre productions
- Long runs on the London stage since 1700

== Musical film lists ==
- List of musicals adapted into feature films
- List of highest-grossing musical films
- List of musical films by year
