= List of highest-grossing musical theatre productions =

The following is a list of highest-grossing musical theatre productions on Broadway, the highest-grossing musical theatre franchises globally, and the highest theatre admissions at the box office globally.

== Highest-grossing Broadway musical theatre productions ==
The following is a list of the top 25 highest-grossing Broadway musicals since 1982, based on data collected by the Broadway League. These grosses do not take into account the effects of inflation and as such the list is heavily skewed in favor of more recent Broadway shows. Moreover, the Broadway League did not begin collecting gross data until June 1984. Hence, accurate pre-1984 gross data is not available and this list should not be considered accurate for musicals that premiered on Broadway before that year.

The Lion King sits at the top, with a Broadway gross of $2 billion.

Dates refer to original Broadway productions, with notes added for future productions that outran the Broadway run.

† Background shading indicates shows running in the week commencing 25 September 2026 in Broadway theatres.

Broadway revenue (since 1982)
Rank	Musical	Original production			Revivals	Number of performances	Gross revenue (US$)	Ref.
Rank	Musical	Debut year	Closing year	No. of performances	Revivals	Number of performances	Gross revenue (US$)	Ref.
1	The Lion King †	1997	Present	11,347	—N/a	TBD	$2,206,140,004	
2	Wicked †	2003	Present	8,873	—N/a	TBD	$1,880,811,260	
3	The Phantom of the Opera	1988	2023	13,981	—N/a	13,981	$1,364,632,622	
4	Hamilton †	2015	Present	3,940	—N/a	TBD	$1,200,019,573	
5	The Book of Mormon †	2011	Present	5,701	—N/a	TBD	$907,245,130	
6	Chicago †	1975	1977	936	1996–Present	11,711	$873,751,483	
7	Aladdin †	2014	Present	4,495	—N/a	TBD	$806,133,342	
8	Mamma Mia!	2001	2015	5,758	2025–2026	TBD	$670,150,538	
9	Jersey Boys	2005	2017	4,642	—N/a	4,462	$558,416,092	
10	Les Misérables	1987	2003	6,680	2006; 2014–2016	8,167	$514,794,489	(Note: Les Misérables Broadway revenue: 1987 to 2003 – $406,258,901; 2006, 2014 to 2016 – $108,535,588)
11	Beauty and the Beast	1994	2007	5,461	—N/a	5,461	$429,158,458	
12	Cats†	1982	Present	7,493	2016– 2017; Present	8,165	$421,124,026 (Note: Accurate pre-1984 grosses not available)	(Note: Cats Broadway revenue: 1982 to 2000 – estimated at around $388,000,000; 2016 to 2017 – $65,624,091)
13	Moulin Rouge! The Musical†	2019	2026	2,295	—N/a	TBD	$383,859,307	
14	Harry Potter and the Cursed Child	2018	Present	1,980	—N/a	TBD	$364,454,806	
15	MJ the Musical †	2022	Present	1,877	—N/a	TBD	$360,683,424	
16	Miss Saigon	1991	2001	4,092	2017	4,475	$322,103,948	
17	Kinky Boots	2013	2019	2,505	—N/a	2,505	$318,990,092	
18	Mary Poppins	2006	2013	2,619	—N/a	2,619	$294,558,648	
19	The Producers	2001	2007	2,502	—N/a	2,502	$288,361,724	
20	Hadestown †	2019	Present	2,356	—N/a	TBD	$282,439,561	
21	Rent	1996	2008	5,123	—N/a	5,123	$274,248,128	
22	Beautiful: The Carole King Musical	2014	2019	2,418	—N/a	2,418	$270,623,922	
23	Dear Evan Hansen	2016	2022	1,669	—N/a	1,669	$270,272,357	
24	Cabaret	1966	1969	1,165	1987–1988, 1998–2004, 2014–2015, 2024-2025		$258,456,699	
25	Hairspray	2002	2009	2,642	—N/a	2,642	$252,181,270	
26	SIX: The Musical †	2021	Present	1,961	—N/a	TBD	$237,625,587	

== Highest-grossing musical theatre franchises ==
The following is a list of the top 10 highest-grossing musical theatre franchises worldwide based on limited available data. The following figures include revenue grossed from ticket sales in theaters across the world.

Note that the following gross figures are nominal, not adjusted for inflation, and do not take into account rising ticket prices. As such, the list gives far more weight to more recent musicals.

The Lion King sits at the top, with a gross of $8.2 billion worldwide.

Worldwide revenue
Rank	Musical	Debut year	Gross revenue (US$)	Ref.
1	The Lion King	1997	$8,251,556,700 (Note: Post-December 2017 non-Broadway grosses not included)	(Note: The Lion King musical theatre revenue: Up until December 2017 – $8.1 billion; January 2018 to June 23, 2019 – $151,556,700)
2	The Phantom of the Opera	1986	$6,060,000,000	(Note: The Phantom of the Opera musical theatre revenue: Up until December 18, 2017 – $6 billion; December 25, 2017, to January 20, 2019 – $61,015,427)
3	Wicked	2003	$5,000,000,000+	(Note: Wicked revenue: By expanding its reach beyond Broadway, “Wicked” has been seen by nearly 65 million people worldwide and has amassed over $5 billion in global sales. https://variety.com/2023/legit/news/wicked-fourth-longest-running-show-broadway-history-1235575464/)
4	Mamma Mia!	1999	$4,000,000,000	
5	Cats	1981	$3,565,624,091 (Note: Post-2012 non-Broadway grosses not included)	(Note: Cats worldwide revenue: As of 2012 – $3.5 billion; 2016–2017 – $65,624,091)
6	Les Misérables	1980	$2,708,535,588 (Note: Post-May-2013 non-Broadway grosses not included)	(Note: Les Misérables musical theatre revenue: Up until 2013 – $2.6 billion; 2014–2016 – $108,535,588)
7	Miss Saigon	1989	$1,636,259,976	(Note: Miss Saigon revenue: Up until 2013 – $1.6 billion; 2017–2018 – $36,259,976)
8	Jersey Boys	2004	$1,644,848,098	(Note: Jersey Boys revenue: Up until May 3, 2013 – $1.5 billion; May 6, 2013, to January 2017 – $144,848,098)
9	Beauty and the Beast	1993	$1,600,000,000	
10	Starlight Express	1984	$1,200,000,000	

== Box office admissions (ticket sales) ==
The following is a list of the musical theatre franchises with the highest theatre admissions. The list includes worldwide ticket sales as well as Broadway ticket sales since 1984. Shows must have sold more than 1 million tickets.

The Broadway League did not begin collecting admissions data until June 1984. Hence, pre-1984 Broadway admissions data is not available and the Broadway figures should not be considered accurate for musicals that premiered on Broadway before that year.

† Background shading indicates shows running in the week commencing 25 September 2026 in Broadway theatres.

Musical	Debut year	Worldwide ticket sales	Broadway ticket sales (Note: Pre-1984 admissions not available)
The Phantom of the Opera	1988	130,000,000	18,000,000
The Lion King †	1997	100,000,000	15,000,000
Cats	1982	73,000,000	9,333,667
Les Misérables	1987	130,000,000	10,600,947
Mamma Mia!	2001	65,000,000	7,566,124
Wicked †	2003	55,000,000	11,000,000
Beauty and the Beast	1994	35,000,000	7,609,397
Miss Saigon	1991	35,000,000	6,584,913
Chicago †	1975	31,000,000	9,000,000
Jersey Boys	2005	25,000,000	5,150,298
Starlight Express	1984	25,000,000	1,153,702

== See also ==
- Lists of musicals
- List of highest-grossing musical films
- Long-running theatre productions
  - Broadway shows
  - West End shows
