= List of Tony and Olivier Award–winning musicals =

The following is a list of musicals that have won the Tony Award or Laurence Olivier Award for Best Musical. Highlighted shows are currently running on either Broadway or West End as of June 2026.

Title	Year	Music	Lyrics	Book	Tony	Olivier	Notes
42nd Street	1980	Harry Warren	Al Dubin	Michael Stewart, Mark Bramble	1981	1984	The Broadway revival in 2001 won the Tony for Best Revival.
1776	1969	Sherman Edwards	Edwards	Peter Stone	1969		
Ain't Misbehavin'	1978	Fats Waller	various	Murray Horwitz, Richard Maltby, Jr.	1978		
Annie	1977	Charles Strouse	Martin Charnin	Thomas Meehan	1977		Nominated for ten Tony Awards, winning seven.
Applause	1970	Charles Strouse	Lee Adams	Betty Comden, Adolph Green	1970		Nominated for ten Tony Awards, winning four, including Best Actress for Lauren Bacall, in her musical debut.
Avenue Q	2003	Jeff Marx	Robert Lopez	Jeff Whitty	2004		Nominated for six Tony Awards, winning three.
Back to the Future	2020	Alan Silvestri	Glen Ballard	Bob Gale, Robert Zemeckis		2022	
The Band's Visit	2016	David Yazbek	Yazbek	Itamar Moses	2018		Nominated for eleven Tony Awards, winning ten.
Beauty and the Beast	1994	Alan Menken	Howard Ashman, Tim Rice	Linda Woolverton		1998	
Big River	1984	Roger Miller	Miller	William Hauptman	1985		Nominated for ten Tony Awards, winning seven.
Billy Elliot the Musical	2005	Elton John	Lee Hall	Hall	2009	2006	Nominated for fifteen Tony Awards, winning ten.
Blood Brothers	1983	Willy Russell	Russell	Russell		1983	Nominated for seven Tony Awards.
The Book of Mormon	2011	Trey Parker, Robert Lopez, Matt Stone	Parker, Lopez, Stone	Parker, Lopez, Stone	2011	2014	Nominated for fourteen Tony Awards, winning nine.
Bye Bye Birdie	1960	Charles Strouse	Lee Adams	Michael Stewart	1961		Nominated for seven Tonys, winning four, including Best Actor for Dick Van Dyke.
Cabaret	1966	John Kander	Fred Ebb	Joe Masteroff	1967		The 1998 Broadway revival won the Tony for Best Revival. The 1972 film adaptation became popular. Danny Burstein nominated for Featured Actor in 2014 Broadway revival, Linda Emond for Featured Actress.
La Cage aux Folles	1983	Jerry Herman	Herman	Harvey Fierstein	1984		The Broadway revivals in both 2004 and 2010 both won the Tony Award for Best Revival. The West End 2008 revival won the Olivier Award for Best Revival.
Candide	1956	Leonard Bernstein	Richard Wilbur	Hugh Wheeler		1988	
Carmen Jones	1943	Georges Bizet	Oscar Hammerstein II	Hammerstein		1992	
Caroline, or Change	2003	Jeanine Tesori	Tony Kushner	Kushner		2007	
Cats	1981	Andrew Lloyd Webber	T. S. Eliot	Lloyd Webber, Trevor Nunn	1983	1981	It was the longest-running Broadway musical in history until it was surpassed by The Phantom of the Opera. It won seven Tony Awards inducing Best Musical. The original production closed in September 2000. Cats revival is currently running at Neil Simon Theatre, the revival did not receive any Tony nominations for the 2017 season.
A Chorus Line	1975	Marvin Hamlisch	Edward Kleban	James Kirkwood, Jr., Nicholas Dante	1976	1976	It was the longest-running Broadway musical in history until it was surpassed by Cats. Nominated for twelve Tonys, winning nine, including Best Musical.
City of Angels	1989	Cy Coleman	David Zippel	Larry Gelbart	1990	1994	
Come from Away	2015	Irene Sankoff, David Hein	Sankoff, Hein	Sankoff, Hein		2019	
The Comedy of Errors	1976	Guy Woolfenden	Trevor Nunn	Nunn, based on William Shakespeare		1977	
Company	1970	Stephen Sondheim	Sondheim	George Furth	1971		Nominated for twelve Tonys, winning six. The Broadway revival in 2007 won the Tony for Best Revival.
Contact	1999	various	—	John Weidman, Susan Stroman	2000		Nominated for six Tonys, winning four. A "dance play", the musical has no lyrics and used pre-recorded music.
Crazy for You	1992	George Gershwin	Ira Gershwin	Ken Ludwig	1992	1993	Nominated for nine Tony Awards, winning three.
The Curious Case of Benjamin Button	2019	Darren Clark	Clark, Jethro Compton	Compton		2025	
Damn Yankees	1955	Richard Adler	Jerry Ross	George Abbott, Douglass Wallop	1956		Nominated for nine Tony Awards, winning seven.
Dear Evan Hansen	2015	Benji Pasek and Justin Paul	Pasek and Paul	Steven Levenson	2017	2020	Nominated for nine Tony Awards, winning six, including Best Musical.
Drood	1985	Rupert Holmes	Holmes	Holmes	1986		Nominated for eleven Tony Awards, winning five.
Evita	1978	Andrew Lloyd Webber	Tim Rice	Rice	1980	1978	Nominated for eleven Tonys, winning seven; winning two Olivier Awards. It was Lloyd Webber and Rice's last musical theatre collaboration.
Fiddler on the Roof	1964	Jerry Bock	Sheldon Harnick	Joseph Stein	1965		Nominated for ten Tonys, winning nine; longest-running Broadway musical in history, until it was surpassed by Grease.
Fiorello!	1959	Jerry Bock	Sheldon Harnick	George Abbott, Jerome Weidman	1960		It won the 1960 Pulitzer Prize for Drama.
Follies	1971	Stephen Sondheim	Sondheim	James Goldman		1987	The 1971 Broadway production won seven Tony Awards.
Fosse	1999	various	various	—	1999		This was a revue.
Fun Home	2013	Jeanine Tesori	Lisa Kron	Kron	2015		Nominated for twelve Tony Awards, winning five.
A Funny Thing Happened on the Way to the Forum	1962	Stephen Sondheim	Sondheim	Burt Shevelove, Larry Gelbart	1963		Nominated for eight Tony Awards, winning six.
A Gentleman's Guide to Love and Murder	2014	Steven Lutvak	Robert L. Freedman, Lutvak	Freedman	2014		Nominated for ten Tony Awards, winning four.
Groundhog Day	2016	Tim Minchin	Tim Minchin	Danny Rubin		2017	
Guys and Dolls	1950	Frank Loesser	Loesser	Jo Swerling, Abe Burrows	1951		It won all five Tonys for which it was nominated. The 1955 film adaptation became popular.
Hadestown	2016	Anaïs Mitchell	Mitchell	Mitchell	2019		Nominated for fourteen Tony Awards, winning eight.
Hairspray	2002	Marc Shaiman	Scott Wittman, Shaiman	Thomas Meehan	2003	2008	Nominated for thirteen Tony Awards, winning eight.
Hallelujah, Baby!	1967	Jule Styne	Betty Comden, Adolph Green	Arthur Laurents	1968		
Hamilton	2015	Lin-Manuel Miranda	Miranda	Miranda	2016	2018	Nominated for sixteen Tonys, winning eleven including Best Musical. It won the 2016 Pulitzer Prize for Drama. As of 2021, Hamilton currently holds the record for most Tony nominations for one production, with 16. It also now holds the record for most Olivier Award nominations with 13 and it won 7 Olivier Awards including Best New Musical tying the most wins with Matilda
Hello, Dolly!	1964	Jerry Herman	Herman	Michael Stewart	1964		Nominated for eleven Tonys, winning ten. The West End revival in 2009 won the Olivier for Best Revival.
Honk!	1992	George Stiles	Anthony Drewe	Drewe		2000	
How to Succeed in Business Without Really Trying	1961	Frank Loesser	Loesser	Abe Burrows, Jack Weinstock, Willie Gilbert	1962		Nominated for eight Tonys, winning seven. It won the 1962 Pulitzer Prize for Drama.
In the Heights	2007	Lin-Manuel Miranda	Miranda	Quiara Alegría Hudes	2008		Nominated for thirteen Tony Awards, winning four.
Jerome Robbins' Broadway	1989	various	various	—	1989		This revue was nominated for nine Tony Awards, winning five.
Jerry Springer: The Opera	2003	—	—	Stewart Lee, Richard Thomas		2004	Nominated for eight Olivier Awards, winning four.
Jersey Boys	2005	Bob Gaudio, Bob Crewe	Gaudio, Crewe	Marshall Brickman, Rick Elice	2006	2009	Nominated for eight Tony Awards, winning four.
Jolson	1995	various	various	Francis Essex, Rob Bettinson		1996	
Kat and the Kings	1998	Taliep Petersen	David Kramer	Kramer		1999	The cast collectively won the Laurence Olivier Award for Best Actor in a Musical.
Kimberly Akimbo	2021	Jeanine Tesori	David Lindsay-Abaire	David Lindsay-Abaire	2023		Nominated for eight Tony Awards, winning five.
The King and I	1951	Richard Rodgers	Oscar Hammerstein II	Hammerstein	1952		It won all five Tonys for which it was nominated. The 1956 film adaptation became popular.
Kinky Boots	2013	Cyndi Lauper	Lauper	Harvey Fierstein	2013	2016	Nominated for thirteen Tony Awards, winning six. Also nominated for seven Olivier Awards, winning three.
Kismet	1953	Alexander Borodin	Robert Wright, George Forrest	Wright, Forrest	1954		
Kiss Me, Kate	1948	Cole Porter	Porter	Samuel and Bella Spewack	1949		The Broadway revival in 2000 won the Tony Award for Best Revival.
Kiss of the Spider Woman	1992	John Kander	Fred Ebb	Terrence McNally	1993		
Legally Blonde	2009	Nell Benjamin, Laurence O'Keefe	Benjamin, O'Keefe	Heather Hach		2011	
Les Misérables	1980	Claude-Michel Schönberg	Alain Boublil	Boublil, Herbert Kretzmer	1987		Nominated for twelve Tony Awards, winning eight.
The Lion King	1997	Elton John	Tim Rice	Roger Allers, Irene Mecchi	1998		Nominated for eleven Tony Awards, winning six. It has grossed worldwide over $6.2 billion as of 2014.
A Little Night Music	1973	Stephen Sondheim	Sondheim	Hugh Wheeler	1973		Nominated for twelve Tony Awards, winning six.
Man of La Mancha	1965	Mitch Leigh	Joe Darion	Dale Wasserman	1966		Nominated for seven Tony Awards, winning five.
Martin Guerre	1996	Claude-Michel Schönberg	Alain Boublil, Stephen Clarke	Boublil, Schönberg		1997	
Matilda the Musical	2011	Tim Minchin	Minchin	Dennis Kelly		2012	It won a record of seven Olivier Awards, including Best Musical and five Tony Awards. As of 2021, Matilda the Musical currently ties with the most wins with Hamilton with 7.
Maybe Happy Ending	2016	Will Aronson	Hue Park, Aronson	Park, Aronson	2025		Nominated for ten Tony Awards, winning six.
Me and My Girl	1937	Noel Gay	Douglas Furber, L. Arthur Rose	Furber, Rose		1985	
Memphis	2003	David Bryan	Bryan, Joe DiPietro	DiPietro	2010		
Merrily We Roll Along	1981	Stephen Sondheim	Sondheim	George Furth		2001	
Moulin Rouge!	2018	various	various	John Logan	2020		Nominated for fourteen Tony Awards, winning ten.
The Music Man	1957	Meredith Willson	Willson	Willson	1958		Nominated for eight Tony Awards, winning five.
My Fair Lady	1956	Frederick Loewe	Alan Jay Lerner	Jay Lerner	1957		Nominated for nine Tonys, winning six; longest-running Broadway musical until it was surpassed by Fiddler. The 1964 film adaptation became popular.
Nine	1982	Maury Yeston	Yeston	Arthur Kopit	1982		The Broadway revival in 2003 won the Tony Award for Best Revival.
Once	2012	Glen Hansard, Markéta Irglová	Hansard, Irglová	Enda Walsh	2012		It won eight Tony Awards including Best Musical.
Once on This Island	1990	Stephen Flaherty	Lynn Ahrens	Ahrens		1995	
Operation Mincemeat	2019	David Cumming, Felix Hagan, Natasha Hodgson, Zoë Roberts	Cumming, Hagan, Hodgson, Roberts	Cumming, Hagan, Hodgson, Roberts		2024	
Our House	2003	Madness	Madness	Tim Firth		2003	
The Outsiders	2023	Jonathan Clay, Zach Chance and Justin Levine	Jonathan Clay, Zach Chance and Justin Levine	Adam Rapp and Justin Levine	2024		Nominated for twelve Tony Awards, winning four.
Paddington: The Musical	2025	Tom Fletcher	Fletcher	Jessica Swale		2026	
The Pajama Game	1954	Richard Adler	Jerry Ross	George Abbott, Richard Pike Bissell	1955		The Broadway revival in 2006 won the Tony Award for Best Revival.
Passion	1994	Stephen Sondheim	Sondheim	James Lapine	1994		It is the shortest-running Tony winner in history.
The Phantom of the Opera	1986	Andrew Lloyd Webber	Charles Hart	Lloyd Webber, Richard Stilgoe	1988	1986	Nominated for nine Tonys, winning seven; longest-running Broadway production in history. It has grossed worldwide over $6 billion as of 2014.
Poppy	1982	Monty Norman	Peter Nichols	Nichols		1982	
The Producers	2001	Mel Brooks	Brooks	Brooks, Thomas Meehan	2001	2005	The most Tony Awards in history, winning twelve awards out of fifteen nominations. It won three Olivier Awards including Best Musical and Best Actor in a Musical.
Raisin	1973	Judd Woldin	Robert Brittan	Robert Nemiroff, Charlotte Zaltzberg	1974		
Redhead	1959	Albert Hague	Dorothy Fields	Dorothy, Herbert Fields, Sidney Sheldon, David Shaw	1959		
Rent	1996	Jonathan Larson	Larson	Larson	1996		Nominated for ten Tonys, winning four including Best Musical; it also won the 1996 Pulitzer Prize for Drama.
Return to the Forbidden Planet	1989	various	various	Bob Carlton		1989; 1990	
Schmigadoon!	2025	Cinco Paul	Paul	Paul	2026		Nominated for twelve Tony Awards, winning four.
Songbook	1979	Monty Norman	Norman, Julian Moore	Norman, Moore		1979	
The Sound of Music	1959	Richard Rodgers	Oscar Hammerstein II	Howard Lindsay, Russel Crouse	1960		Nominated for seven Tonys, winning five; the 1965 film adaptation became popular.
South Pacific	1949	Richard Rodgers	Oscar Hammerstein II	Hammerstein, Joshua Logan	1950		Ten Tony nominations, winning all ten and the Pulitzer; the 2008 Broadway revival won the Tony for Best Revival and six other Tonys out of eleven nominations.
Spamalot	2005	John DuPrez, Eric Idle	Idle	Idle	2005		Nominated for fourteen Tony Awards, winning three including Best Musical.
Spring Awakening	2006	Duncan Sheik	Steven Sater	Sater	2007	2010	Nominated for eleven Tony Awards, winning eight including Best Musical; and four Olivier Awards including Best Musical.
Standing at the Sky's Edge	2019	Richard Hawley	Hawley	Chris Bush		2023	
A Strange Loop	2019	Michael R. Jackson	Jackson	Jackson	2022		Nominated for eleven Tony Awards, winning two.
Sunday in the Park with George	1984	Stephen Sondheim	Sondheim	James Lapine		1991	It was nominated for ten Tony Awards winning two and the 1985 Pulitzer. It won the Olivier Award for Best New Musical. The 2006 West End revival won the Olivier for Best Revival.
Sunny Afternoon	2013	Ray Davies	Davies	Joe Penhall		2015	
Sunset Boulevard	1993	Andrew Lloyd Webber	Don Black, Christopher Hampton	Hampton, Black	1995		Nominated for eleven Tony Awards, winning seven including Best Musical. The Broadway revival in 2024 won the Tony for Best Revival.
Sweeney Todd: The Demon Barber of Fleet Street	1979	Stephen Sondheim	Sondheim	Hugh Wheeler	1979	1980	It won eight Tony Awards including Best Musical. The West End revivals in 1993 and 2012 won their respective Olivier Awards for Best Revival.
Thoroughly Modern Millie	2002	Jeanine Tesori, Arthur Sullivan	Dick Scanlan	Richard Morris, Scanlan	2002		Nominated for eleven Tony Awards, winning six including Best Musical.
Titanic	1997	Maury Yeston	Yeston	Peter Stone	1997		
Top Hat	2012	Irving Berlin	Berlin	Matthew White, Howard Jacques		2013	
Two Gentlemen of Verona	1971	Galt MacDermot	John Guare	Guare, Mel Shapiro	1972		It won two Tony Awards including Best Musical.
The Will Rogers Follies	1991	Cy Coleman	Betty Comden, Adolph Green	Peter Stone	1991		It won six Tony Awards including Best Musical.
The Wiz	1975	Charlie Smalls	Smalls	William F. Brown	1975		Nominated for eight Tony Awards, winning seven including Best Musical.
Wonderful Town	1953	Leonard Bernstein	Betty Comden, Adolph Green	Joseph Fields, Jerome Chodorov	1953		It won all five Tony Awards for which it was nominated.

== See also ==
- Broadway theatre
- West End theatre
- Lists of musicals
- Musical theatre
- Tony Award for Best Musical
- Laurence Olivier Award for Best New Musical
- AFI's 100 Years of Musicals
- Long-running musical theatre productions
- List of Tony and Olivier Award–winning plays
