= Long-running musical theatre productions =

This is a selected list of the longest-running musical theatre productions in history divided into two sections. The first section lists all Broadway and West End productions of musicals that have exceeded 2,500 performances, in order of greatest number of performances in either market. The second section lists, in alphabetical order, musicals that have broken historical long run records for musical theatre on Broadway, in the West End or off-Broadway, since 1866, in alphabetical order.

Legend:

m = music, l = lyrics, b = book
(Noteworthy trivia appear in parentheses)
(5,678) = number of performances (in original Broadway production if not specified)
> denotes shows that are still in production. The number of Broadway performances is updated per Playbill.com as of June 2026. The number of West End performances is updated per officiallondontheatre.com as of January 2025, and sporadically as information becomes available.
"Tony Award winner" denotes winner of Tony for Best Musical
"Olivier Award winner" denotes winner of award for Best New Musical

== Longest-running musicals on Broadway and the West End ==
The following is a list of musical theatre productions that have exceeded 2,500 performances in a single run in a Broadway or West End theatre.

Title	Creators	Broadway Perfs.	West End Perfs.	Comment
Les Misérables	m Claude-Michel Schönberg, lb Alain Boublil (English lyrics by Herbert Kretzmer)	6,680	>16,100	1985 London, 1987 Broadway (1987 Tony Award winner; nominated for 12 Tony Awards and won eight)
The Phantom of the Opera	m Andrew Lloyd Webber, l Charles Hart, b Lloyd Webber and Richard Stilgoe	13,981	>15,600	1986 London, 1988 Broadway (the longest-running musical in Broadway history since surpassing Cats; 1988 Tony Award winner)
Chicago	m John Kander, l Fred Ebb, b Bob Fosse and Fred Ebb	>11,600	6,187	1996 Revival (longest-running American musical in both West End and Broadway history, surpassing A Chorus Line in 2011, and the longest-running revival in Broadway history)
The Lion King	m Elton John, l Tim Rice, b Roger Allers and Irene Mecchi	>11,200	>10,500	1997 Broadway, 1999 London (1998 Tony Award winner)
Mamma Mia!	ml Björn Ulvaeus and Benny Andersson, b Catherine Johnson	5,773	>10,700	1999 London, 2001 Broadway
Blood Brothers	mlb Willy Russell	839	10,013	1983 London, 1993 Broadway (1983 Olivier Award winner; longest-running musical revival in history)
Cats	m Andrew Lloyd Webber, l T. S. Eliot, b Lloyd Webber and Trevor Nunn ("Memory")	7,485	8,949	1981 London, 1982 Broadway (1983 Tony Award winner, the longest-running work of musical theatre (other than The Fantasticks), until beaten by Les Misérables)
Wicked	ml Stephen Schwartz, b Winnie Holzman	>8,800	>7,600	2003 Broadway, 2006 London
Starlight Express	m Andrew Lloyd Webber, l Richard Stilgoe (with later revisions by Don Black and David Yazbek; through composed; staged with the cast entirely on skates)	761	7,406	1984 London, 1987 Broadway, 1988 Bochum, Germany >10,000 in Germany
Black and White Minstrels	mlb George Mitchell	N/A	6,477	1960 London; This minstrel show (a revue) was in The Guinness Book of Records as the stage show seen by the largest number of people and had international fame (the longest-running work of musical theatre (other than The Fantasticks), until beaten by Cats)
A Chorus Line	m Marvin Hamlisch, l Edward Kleban, b James Kirkwood, Jr. and Nicholas Dante	6,137	969	1975 Broadway, 1976 London (the longest-running Broadway musical in history, until beaten by Cats) (1976 Tony Award winner)
Oh! Calcutta!	m Peter Schickele (aka “PDQ Bach”), Robert Dennis and Stanley Walden, lb various	5,959	3,918	1969 Broadway, 1970 London; 1976 Broadway revival (nude revue)
The Book of Mormon	mlb Trey Parker, Robert Lopez and Matt Stone	>5,600	>4,800	2011 Broadway, 2013 London (2011 Tony Award winner; won 9 Tonys)
Beauty and the Beast	m Alan Menken, l Howard Ashman and Tim Rice, b Linda Woolverton	5,461	1,077	1994 Broadway, 1997 London (1998 Olivier Award winner)
Matilda the Musical	ml Tim Minchin, b Dennis Kelly	1,554	>5,400	2011 London, 2013 Broadway
Buddy – The Buddy Holly Story	ml Buddy Holly and others, b Alan Janes	225	5,140	1989 London, 1990 Broadway
Rent	mlb Jonathan Larson	5,123	c. 600	1996 Broadway, 1998 London (Pulitzer Prize Winner, 1996 Tony Award winner)
We Will Rock You	m Queen, lb Ben Elton and Queen members Brian May and Roger Taylor	N/A	4,659	2002 London
Thriller – Live	ml The Jackson 5 and Michael Jackson, b Adrian Grant	N/A	4,657	2009 London
Jersey Boys	m Bob Gaudio, l Bob Crewe, b Marshall Brickman and Rick Elice	4,642	3,787	2005 Broadway, 2008 London (2005 Tony Award winner; 2008 Olivier Award winner)
Billy Elliot the Musical	m Elton John, lb Lee Hall	1,304	4,566	2005 London, 2008 Broadway (2006 Olivier Award winner; 2009 Tony Award winner, won 10 of 15 Tony nominations)
Aladdin	m Alan Menken, l Howard Ashman, Tim Rice and Chad Beguelin, b Beguelin	>4,400	1,361	2014 Broadway
Miss Saigon	m Claude-Michel Schönberg, l Alain Boublil and Richard Maltby, Jr.,b Alain Boublil	4,092	4,264	1989 London, 1991 Broadway (adaptation of Puccini's Madame Butterfly)
Hamilton	mlb Lin-Manuel Miranda	>3,900	>3,100	2015 Broadway, 2017 London (2016 Tony Award winner, 16 Tony Award nominations, won 11) (2018 Olivier Award winner)
Avenue Q	ml Robert Lopez and Jeff Marx, b Jeff Whitty	2,534	3,586	2003 Broadway, 2006 London (2004 Tony Award winner) (reopened off-Broadway on October 21, 2009, where it has been playing continuously since)
42nd Street	m Harry Warren, l Al Dubin, b Michael Stewart and Mark Bramble	3,486	1,824	1980 Broadway, 1984 London (1981 Tony Award winner; 1984 Olivier Award winner)
Grease	mlb Jim Jacobs and Warren Casey	3,388	2,529	1972 Broadway, 1973 London (the longest-running Broadway musical in history, until beaten by A Chorus Line)
Jesus Christ Superstar	m Andrew Lloyd Webber, lb Tim Rice	720	3,357	1971 Broadway, 1972 London (seminal rock opera and briefly the longest-running musical in history (not counting Black and White Minstrels or The Fantasticks), until beaten by Grease)
Me and My Girl	m Noel Gay, lb Douglas Furber and L. Arthur Rose	1,420	3,303	1985 revival (originally ran 1,646 performances from 1937, which was unusual at the time) (1985 Olivier Award winner) (In 1937, with World War II impending, The Times famously used its hit song in a headline: "While dictators rage and statesmen talk, all Europe dances – to 'The Lambeth Walk'.")
Fiddler on the Roof	m Jerry Bock, l Sheldon Harnick, b Joseph Stein ("If I Were a Rich Man")	3,242	2,030	1964 Broadway, 1967 London (the longest-running Broadway musical in history, until beaten by Grease) (1965 Tony Award winner)
Evita	m Andrew Lloyd Webber, l Tim Rice	1,567	3,176	1978 London, 1979 Broadway (last collaboration between Lloyd Webber and Rice on a musical) (1978 Olivier Award winner; 1980 Tony Award winner)
Magic Mike Live	m Jack Rayer, lb Reid Carolin	0	>3,000	2018 London
The Rocky Horror Show	mlb Richard O'Brien	45	2,958	1973 London, 1975 Broadway
Hello, Dolly!	ml Jerry Herman, b Michael Stewart	2,844	794	1964 Broadway, 1965 London (the second longest-running Broadway musical in history until Grease pushed it down a rank) (1964 Tony Award winner; won 10 Tonys)
My Fair Lady	m Frederick Loewe, lb Alan Jay Lerner ("I Could Have Danced All Night", "On the Street Where You Live")	2,717	2,281	1956 Broadway, 1958 London (the longest-running musical in history, until beaten by The Fantasticks off-Broadway and Fiddler on the Roof on Broadway) (the second-longest-running musical in West End history, after Salad Days, when it closed) (1957 Tony Award winner)
Six	mlb Toby Marlow and Lucy Moss	>1,900	>2,650	2019 London, 2021 Broadway
Hairspray	m Marc Shaiman, l Shaiman and Scott Wittman, b Mark O'Donnell and Thomas Meehan	2,642	c. 1,000	2002 Broadway, 2007 London (2003 Tony Award Winner, nominated for 13, won eight) (2008 Olivier Award Winner, nominated for 11, won 4)
Mary Poppins	ml Richard M. Sherman and Robert B. Sherman, b Julian Fellowes	2,619	1,428	2004 London, 2006 Broadway
Oliver!	mlb Lionel Bart	774	2,618	1960 London, 1963 Broadway (longest-running West End musical in history at the time of closing)
Kinky Boots	ml Cyndi Lauper, b Harvey Fierstein	2,507	1,400+	2013 Broadway, 2015 London (2013 Tony Award winner, 13 Tony Award nominations, won 6) (2016 Olivier Award winner)
The Producers	ml Mel Brooks, b Brooks and Thomas Meehan	2,502	940	2001 Broadway, 2004 London (2001 Tony Award winner; won a record-breaking 12 Tony Awards)

== Other historic long runs ==
The following is an annotated alphabetical list of other musicals that set records for long runs.

- Annie Get Your Gun, 1946 Broadway, 1947 London, ml Irving Berlin, b Herbert and Dorothy Fields (1,147: 1,304 in London) (Berlin wrote the songs when Jerome Kern died suddenly)
- The Belle of New York 1898, m Gustave Kerker, lb Hugh Morton (697 in London) (After New York run, transferred to London in 1898, where it ran for an almost unprecedented 697 performances and became the first American musical to run for over a year in London.
- The Black Crook, 1866, m George Bickwell and others, l by Theodore Kennick and others, and b by Charles M. Barras (474). This piece is often cited as the first long-running "musical", in that an original book was combined with songs and dancing. Its 474 performances were a record for the day.
- The Boy Friend, 1953 London, 1954 Broadway, mlb Sandy Wilson (2,078 in London; briefly the third longest-running musical in history, after Chu Chin Chow and Oklahoma!, until demoted by Salad Days) (Julie Andrews' American debut)
- Carousel, 1945 Broadway, 1950 London, m Richard Rodgers, b Oscar Hammerstein II (899) (the authors' favorite of their musicals) (one of the longest-running Broadway shows up to that time)
- The Chimes of Normandy (adapted from the French Les Cloches de Corneville), 1878, m Robert Planquette, lb H. B. Farnie and R. Reece (705) (the longest-running piece of musical theatre in history until Dorothy broke its record in 1886)
- A Chinese Honeymoon, 1901, m Howard Talbot and Ivan Caryll, l Harry Greenbank, and lb George Dance (1,075) (The first musical to run for more than 1,000 performances)
- Chu Chin Chow, 1916, m Frederic Norton, b Oscar Asche (2,238 in London) (longest-running musical in history from 1916 until Salad Days in 1954, and one of the World War I smash hits that defined the music of the era. See also The Maid of the Mountains).
- Dorothy, 1886, m Alfred Cellier, lb B. C. Stephenson (931) (one of the first "modern" musicals, and the longest-running piece of musical theatre in history until A Chinese Honeymoon in 1901.
- The Fantasticks, 1960, m Harvey Schmidt, l Tom Jones (17,162) Longest-running musical in history.
- Florodora, 1899, m Leslie Stuart and Paul Rubens, l Edward Boyd-Jones and Rubens, b Owen Hall (552) (second longest-running Broadway musical (after A Trip to Chinatown) until Irene in 1919 pushed it down to third; it was first very successful in London (455 performances) and achieved international success in Europe and elsewhere, including Broadway in 1900. It was the first instance of a British production achieving such a long initial Broadway run.)
- Forbidden Broadway, 1982, m arranged in part and written in part by Gerard Alessandrini, lb Gerard Alessandrini (2,332) (briefly the third longest-running off-broadway production; this spoof of current musicals ran almost continuously from 1982 to 2010 in various versions)
- The Geisha, 1896, m Sidney Jones and Lionel Monckton, l Harry Greenbank, b Owen Hall (760 in London) (The second longest-running piece of musical theatre (after Dorothy) until it was edged out by San Toy in 1899. It was one of a series of highly successful musicals at Daly's Theatre in London.)
- Hellzapoppin (revue), 1938, ml Sammy Fain and Charles Tobias, b John "Ole" Olsen and Harold "Chic" Johnson (1,404, the longest-running Broadway musical, until beaten by Oklahoma! Its opening scene was Hitler speaking in a Yiddish accent, and it included audience participation.)
- H.M.S. Pinafore, 1878, m Arthur Sullivan, lb W. S. Gilbert (571 in London) (first G&S smash hit and second longest-running piece of musical theatre in history until it was edged out by Gilbert and Sullivan's Patience in 1881. One of the most frequently produced pieces of musical theatre in the world)
- I Love You, You're Perfect, Now Change, 1996, m Jimmy Roberts, lb Joe DiPietro (5003) (2nd longest-running Off Broadway musical in history)
- Irene, 1919, m Harry Tierney, l Joseph McCarthy (lyricist), b James Montgomery (670) (longest-running Broadway show up to that time (though London had already had many longer-running shows ) until Hellzapoppin in 1938)
- Little Shop of Horrors, 1982, m Alan Menken, lb Howard Ashman (2,209) (the highest-grossing production in off-Broadway history; revived successfully on Broadway)
- The Maid of the Mountains, 1917, m Harold Fraser-Simson, l Harry Graham, b Frederick Lonsdale ((1,352 in London) (second longest-running musical (see Chu Chin Chow) and one of the World War I smash hits that defined the music of the era)
- The Mikado, 1885, m Arthur Sullivan, lb W. S. Gilbert (672 in London) (longest-running G&S piece and second longest-running piece of musical theatre in history until Dorothy in 1886. Probably the most frequently produced piece of musical theatre in the world)
- No, No, Nanette, 1925, m Vincent Youmans, l Irving Caesar, lb Otto Harbach, b Frank Mandel (665 London; 321 Broadway, one of the longest-running interwar shows with international success)
- Nunsense, 1985, mlb Dan Goggin (3,672) (2nd longest-running Off-Broadway musical until surpassed by I Love You, You're Perfect, Now Change)
- Oklahoma!, 1943 Broadway, 1947 London, m Richard Rodgers, lb Oscar Hammerstein II, (2,212, the longest-running Broadway show in history, until My Fair Lady)
- Salad Days, 1954, mlb Julian Slade, l Dorothy Reynolds (2,283 in London, finally breaking the long-held record of Chu Chin Chow for longest-running musical. It held the record until My Fair Lady)
- San Toy, 1899, m Sidney Jones, l Harry Greenbank and Adrian Ross, b Edward Morton (768 in London) (It edged out The Geisha as the second longest-running piece of musical theatre (after Dorothy) and held that record until it was thrashed by A Chinese Honeymoon in 1901. It was one of a series of highly successful musicals at Daly's Theatre in London.)
- The Shop Girl, 1894, m Ivan Caryll and Lionel Monckton, l Adrian Ross, lb H. J. W. Dam (546 in London) (one of the first of the innovative Gaiety Theatre, London musicals produced by George Edwardes in the 1890s)
- The Sound of Music, 1959 Broadway, 1961 London, m Richard Rodgers, l Oscar Hammerstein II, b Howard Lindsay and Russel Crouse (2,385 in London, the second-longest-running musical in West End history at that time, after Oliver!; 1,442 on Broadway) (1960 Tony Award winner) (1965 film became one of the most popular movie musicals)
- South Pacific, 1949 Broadway, 1951 London, m Richard Rodgers, lb Oscar Hammerstein II, b Joshua Logan (1,925, the second longest-running Broadway musical up to that time) (1950 Tony Award winner)
- The Threepenny Opera, 1954, m Kurt Weill lb Marc Blitzstein (from the German of Bertolt Brecht) (2,707) (longest-running off-Broadway musical until The Fantasticks)
- A Trip to Chinatown, 1891, m Percy Gaunt, lb Charles H. Hoyt (657) (first Broadway musical to exceed 500 performances, although London had already had a few longer-running musical theatre pieces. It held the Broadway record until Irene in 1919)

== See also ==
- Lists of musicals
- List of the longest-running Broadway shows
- List of the longest-running West End shows
- Long runs on the London stage, 1700–2020
- Long-running plays (non-musicals)
- List of Tony Award and Olivier Award winning musicals
- AFI's Greatest Movie Musicals
