= List of the longest-running West End shows =

This is a list of the longest-running shows in the West End, a well known professional theatre district in London. Nine currently running shows (two plays, seven musicals) have played more than 4,000 performances: The Mousetrap, Les Misérables, The Phantom of the Opera, Mamma Mia!, The Lion King, Wicked, Matilda, The Book of Mormon, and The Play That Goes Wrong.

== List ==
Unless otherwise stated, the number of performances listed is for the original West End production of the show. M denotes a musical, P denotes a straight play, R denotes a revue, D denotes a dance musical, and S denotes a special case. An asterisk indicates an announced closing date for a currently-running show.

#	Title	Genre	Opening date	Closing date	Performances	Comment
1	The Mousetrap	P	25 November 1952		30,700 (Note: As of October 2026.)	Currently running at the St Martin's Theatre: 6 October 1952 – Production premiere at the Theatre Royal, Nottingham; 25 November 1952 – Opened in the West End at the New Ambassadors Theatre; 13 September 1957 – Longest-running West End play; 12 April 1958 – Longest-running West End show overall, 2,239 performances; 9 December 1964 – 5,000 performances; 1965 & 1999 – Sets, costumes and props replaced; 23 March 1974 – Closed for two days to transfer to the St Martin's Theatre, retaining initial run status; 17 December 1976 – 10,000 performances; 16 December 2000 – 20,000 performances; 18 November 2012 – 25,000 performances; 16 March 2020 – closed for one year, two months and one day due to COVID-19 pandemic, re-opened 17 May 2021; 19 March 2025 - 30,000 performances
2	Les Misérables	M	8 October 1985		16,200 (Note: As of August 2026.)	Currently running at the Sondheim Theatre (formerly the Queen's Theatre): Opened at the Royal Shakespeare Company's Barbican Centre; Transferred to the Palace Theatre on the West End on 5 December 1985; Transferred to the Queen's Theatre in April 2004; Closed temporarily at the Queen's Theatre on 13 July 2019 to allow for theatre refurbishments; Reopened on 16 January 2020 with the updated staging developed for the 25th anniversary production; The longest-running West End musical
3	The Phantom of the Opera	M	9 October 1986		16,000 (Note: As of 31 October 2026.)	Currently running at His Majesty's Theatre: Suspended performances on 15 March 2020 due to the shutdown of West End theatres as a result of the COVID-19 pandemic; Reopened on 27 July 2021 with a smaller orchestra and redesigned set
4	The Woman in Black	P	11 January 1989	4 March 2023	13,232	Premiered at the Stephen Joseph Theatre in Scarborough on 12 December 1987: Opened at the Lyric Hammersmith; Transferred to the Strand Theatre (now the Novello Theatre) on 15 February 1989; Transferred to the Playhouse Theatre on 19 April 1989; Transferred to the Fortune Theatre on 7 June 1989
5	Mamma Mia!	M	6 April 1999		10,900 (Note: As of August 2026.)	Currently running at Novello Theatre: The longest running jukebox musical; Opened at the Prince Edward Theatre; Moved to the Prince of Wales Theatre on 9 June 2004; Moved to Novello Theatre in September 2012
6	The Lion King	M	19 October 1999		10,700 (Note: As of October 2026.)	Currently running at Lyceum Theatre
7	Blood Brothers (revival)	M	28 July 1988	10 November 2012	10,013	Opened at the Albery Theatre (now the Noël Coward Theatre): Transferred to the Phoenix Theatre on 21 November 1991; The longest-running West End revival
8	Cats	M	11 May 1981	11 May 2002	8,949	Opened in London at the New London Theatre (now the Gillian Lynne Theatre): The show closed on its 21st anniversary, when it was broadcast in Covent Garden for those who could not acquire a ticket; It held the record for longest-running West End musical for 17 years before it was overtaken by Les Misérables, the current record holder.
9	Wicked	M	27 September 2006		7,800 (Note: As of October 2026.)	Currently running at Apollo Victoria Theatre
10	Starlight Express	M	27 March 1984	12 January 2002	7,406	
11	No Sex Please, We're British	P	3 June 1971	5 September 1987	6,761	Opened at the Strand Theatre, transferred to the Garrick and Duchess Theatres during the run.
12	Stomp	D	25 September 2002	7 January 2018	6,512	Opened at the Vaudeville Theatre: Moved to the Ambassadors Theatre on 27 September 2007
13	Chicago (revival)	M	18 October 1997	1 September 2012	6,187	Opened at the Adelphi Theatre: Moved to the Cambridge Theatre in April 2006; Moved to the Garrick Theatre in November 2011
14	Matilda	M	24 November 2011		5,600 (Note: As of September 2026.)	Currently running at Cambridge Theatre
15	Buddy – The Buddy Holly Story	M	12 October 1989	3 March 2002	5,140	Opened at the Victoria Palace Theatre: Moved to the Strand Theatre (now the Novello Theatre) in October 1995
16	The Book of Mormon	M	21 March 2013 (Note: As of August 2026.)		4,900 (Note: As of August 2026.)	Currently running at Prince of Wales Theatre
17	We Will Rock You	M	14 May 2002	31 May 2014	4,659	
18	Thriller - Live	R	26 January 2009	15 March 2020	4,657	
19	Billy Elliot the Musical	M	11 May 2005	9 April 2016	4,566	
20	The Play That Goes Wrong	P	14 September 2014		4,500 (Note: As of August 2026.)	Currently running at Duchess Theatre
21	Miss Saigon	M	20 September 1989	30 October 1999	4,264	
22	Oh! Calcutta!	R	30 September 1970	2 February 1980	3,918	
23	Jersey Boys	M	18 March 2008	26 March 2017	3,787	
24	The Complete Works of William Shakespeare (Abridged)	P	7 March 1996	3 April 2005	3,744	
25	The 39 Steps	P	14 September 2006	5 September 2015	3,731 (Note: According to the show's official Facebook. Source)	
26	Jesus Christ Superstar	M	9 August 1972	23 August 1980	3,357	It held the record for longest-running West End musical before it was overtaken by Cats in 1989
27	Me and My Girl	M	12 February 1985	16 January 1993	3,303	This is a revival of the 1937 musical.
28	Magic Mike Live	R	10 November 2018		3,183 (Note: As of 23 September 2026)	Currently running at Hippodrome, London
29	Evita	M	21 June 1978	18 February 1986	3,182 (Note: Exact number came from musicalheaven.com and This Is Theatre; 2,900 given by Society of London Theatre is an estimate.)	
30	Hamilton	M	21 December 2017		3,000 (Note: As of August 2026.)	Currently running at Victoria Palace Theatre
31	Six	M	17 January 2019		2,900 (Note: As of September 2026.)	Currently running at Vaudeville Theatre
32	Oliver!	M	30 June 1960	10 September 1966	2,618	

== See also ==
- Long-running musical theatre productions
- Long-running plays (non-musicals)
- List of the longest-running Broadway shows
