= List of the longest-running Broadway shows =

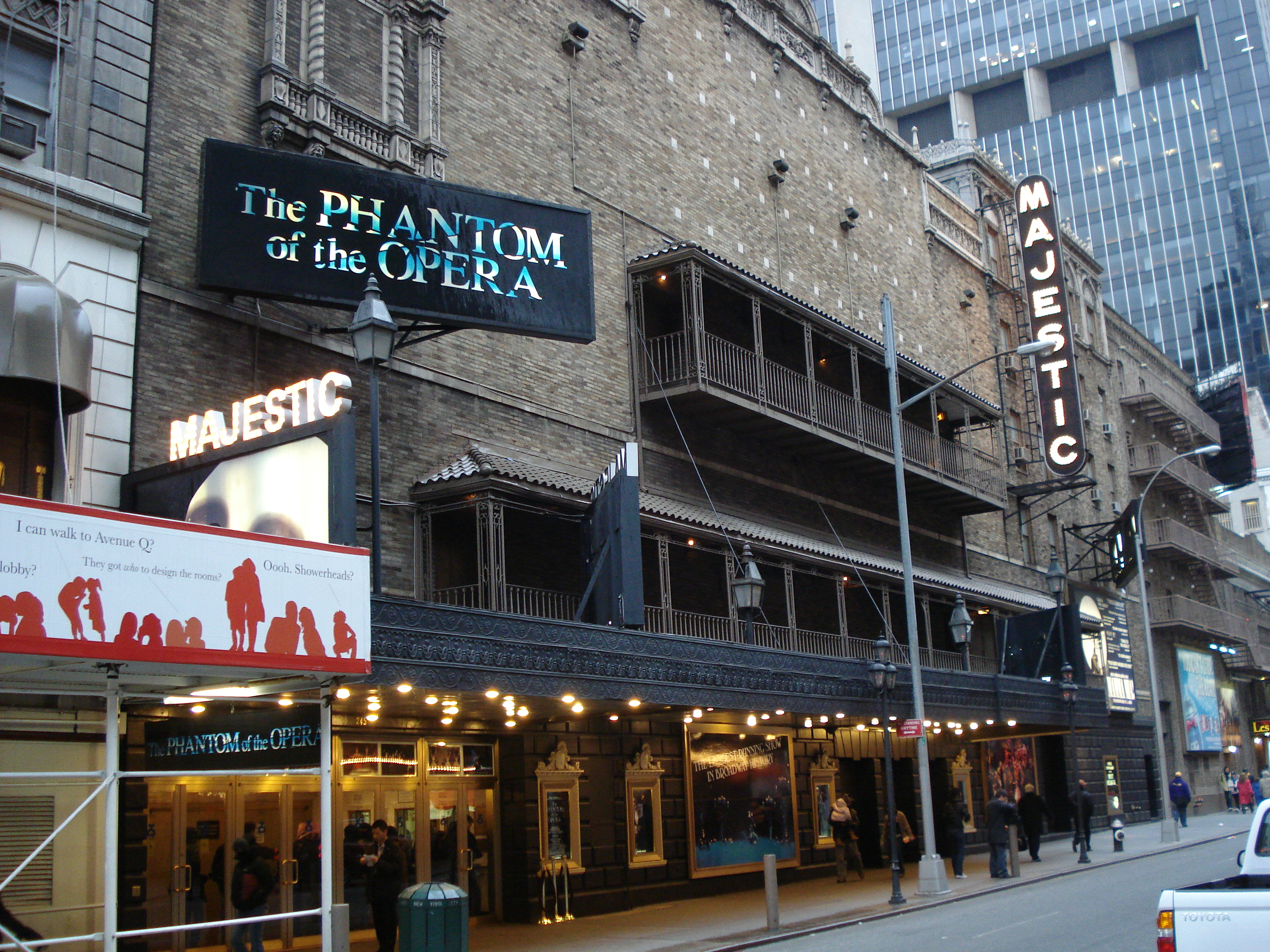
The Phantom of the Opera ran at the Majestic Theatre on Broadway from 1988 to 2023.

This is a list of Broadway shows with 1,000 or more performances, sorted by number of performances. As of September 19, 2026, 13 shows currently running on Broadway have had at least 1,000 performances: the 1996 revival of Chicago, The Lion King, Wicked, The Book of Mormon, Aladdin, Hamilton, Harry Potter and the Cursed Child, Hadestown, Six, MJ the Musical, & Juliet, The Outsiders, and The Great Gatsby.

== List ==
Unless otherwise noted, the run count listed is for the original Broadway production of the show. M denotes a musical, P denotes a straight play, R denotes revue, D denotes a dance show, and S denotes a special show or event. Bold titles indicate that the show is currently running. Totals current through November 22, 2026.

Rank	Peak	Title	Type	Performances	Opening date	Closing date	Awards	Additional information
1	1	The Phantom of the Opera	M	13,981	January 26, 1988	April 16, 2023	7 Tony Awards in 1988, including Best Musical; 7 Drama Desk Awards in 1988	Broadway's longest-running show and musical; First ever Broadway production to surpass 10,000 performances
2	2	Chicago (1996 revival)	M	11,840	November 14, 1996		6 Tony Awards in 1997, including Best Revival of a Musical; 6 Drama Desk Awards in 1997, including Outstanding Revival of a Musical; Grammy Award for Best Musical Show Album in 1998	Currently running at the Ambassador Theatre (venue since 2003); Broadway's longest running current (2026) show and musical; Broadway's longest running revival; Original production in 1975 (936 performances); Longest running show to have premiered on Broadway; Broadway's longest running American show
3	3	The Lion King	M	11,465	November 13, 1997		6 Tony Awards in 1998, including Best Musical; 8 Drama Desk Awards in 1998; Grammy Award for Best Musical Show Album in 1999	Currently running at the Minskoff Theatre (venue since 2006); Longest running Disney Theatrical Productions show; Highest-grossing Broadway show in history; Longest-running Broadway show directed by a woman (Julie Taymor)
4	4	Wicked	M	9,003	October 30, 2003		3 Tony Awards in 2004; 7 Drama Desk Awards in 2004, including Outstanding Musical; Grammy Award for Best Musical Show Album in 2005	Currently running at the Gershwin Theatre (venue since opening)
5	1	Cats	M	7,485	October 7, 1982	September 10, 2000	7 Tony Awards in 1983, including Best Musical; 3 Drama Desk Awards in 1983; Grammy Award for Best Cast Show Album in 1984	First ever Broadway production with 7,000+ performances; Revivals in 2016 (593 performances) and 2026 (142 performances)
6	2	Les Misérables	M	6,680	March 12, 1987	May 18, 2003	8 Tony Awards in 1987, including Best Musical; 5 Drama Desk Awards in 1987, including Outstanding Musical; Grammy Award for Best Musical Cast Show Album in 1988 and 1991	Revivals in 2006 (463 performances) and 2014 (1,024 performances)
7	1	A Chorus Line	M	6,137	July 25, 1975	April 28, 1990	9 Tony Awards in 1976, including Best Musical; 5 Drama Desk Awards in 1976, including Outstanding Musical; A Special Tony Award in 1984 for becoming Broadway's longest-running musical; Pulitzer Prize for Drama in 1976	First ever Broadway production with 4,000, 5,000 and 6,000+ performances; Revival in 2006 (759 performances)
8	2	Oh! Calcutta! (1976 revival)	R	5,959	September 24, 1976	August 6, 1989		Original production in 1969 (1,314 performances); First revival to match its original for 1000+ performances; Broadway's longest-running revue
9	9	The Book of Mormon	M	5,827	March 24, 2011		9 Tony Awards in 2011, including Best Musical; 5 Drama Desk Awards in 2011, including Outstanding Musical; Grammy Award for Best Musical Theater Album in 2012	Currently running at the Eugene O'Neill Theatre (venue since opening)
10	8	Mamma Mia!	M	5,758	October 18, 2001	September 12, 2015		Longest running "jukebox musical" on Broadway; Revival in 2025 (195 performances)
11	6	Beauty and the Beast	M	5,462	April 18, 1994	July 29, 2007	A Tony Award in 1994	
12	7	Rent	M	5,123	April 29, 1996	September 7, 2008	4 Tony Awards in 1996, including Best Musical; 6 Drama Desk Awards in 1996, including Outstanding Musical; Pulitzer Prize for Drama in 1996	
13	12	Jersey Boys	M	4,642	November 6, 2005	January 15, 2017	4 Tony Awards in 2006, including Best Musical; 2 Drama Desk Awards in 2006; Grammy Award for Best Theatre Show Album in 2006	
14	14	Aladdin	M	4,629	March 20, 2014		A Tony Award in 2014; A Drama Desk Award in 2014	Currently running at the New Amsterdam Theatre (venue since opening)
15	6	Miss Saigon	M	4,092	April 11, 1991	January 28, 2001	3 Tony Awards in 1991; 4 Drama Desk Awards in 1991	Revival in 2017 (340 performances)
16	16	Hamilton	M	4,069	August 6, 2015		11 Tony Awards in 2016, including Best Musical; Pulitzer Prize for Drama in 2016; Grammy Award for Best Musical Theater Album in 2016	Currently running at the Richard Rodgers Theatre (venue since opening); Most Tony Award nominations for a production (16)
17	3	42nd Street	M	3,486	August 25, 1980	January 8, 1989	2 Tony Awards in 1981, including Best Musical; 2 Drama Desk Awards in 1981	Revival in 2001 (1,524 performances)
18	1	Grease	M	3,388	February 14, 1972	April 13, 1980	2 Drama Desk Awards in 1972	Revivals in 1994 (1,505 performances) and 2007 (554 performances)
19	1	Fiddler on the Roof	M	3,242	September 22, 1964	July 2, 1972	9 Tony Awards in 1965, including Best Musical; A Special Tony Award in 1972 for becoming Broadway's longest-running musical	Revivals in 1976 (167 performances), 1981 (53 performances), 1990 (241 performances), 2004 (781 performances), and 2015 (431 performances)
20	1	Life with Father	P	3,224	November 8, 1939	July 12, 1947		Broadway's longest-running straight play
21	1	Tobacco Road	P	3,182	December 4, 1933	May 31, 1941		First ever Broadway production with 3,000+ performances; Revivals in 1942 (34 performances), 1943 (66 performances), and 1950 (7 performances)
22	3	Hello, Dolly!	M	2,844	January 16, 1964	December 27, 1970	10 Tony Awards in 1964, including Best Musical; A Drama Desk Award in 1970	Revivals in 1975 (42 performances), 1978 (147 performances), 1995 (116 performances), and 2017 (550 performances)
23	23	Harry Potter and the Cursed Child	P	2,836	April 22, 2018		6 Tony Awards in 2018, including Best Play; 5 Drama Desk Awards in 2018	Currently running at the Lyric Theatre (venue since opening)
24	3	My Fair Lady	M	2,717	March 15, 1956	September 29, 1962	6 Tony Awards in 1957, including Best Musical	Revivals in 1976 (377 performances), 1981 (120 performances), 1993 (165 performances), and 2018 (509 performances)
25	19	Hairspray	M	2,642	August 15, 2002	January 4, 2009	8 Tony Awards in 2003, including Best Musical; 10 Drama Desk Awards in 2003, including Outstanding Musical; Grammy Award for Best Musical Show Album in 2003	
26	22	Mary Poppins	M	2,619	November 16, 2006	March 3, 2013	A Tony Award in 2007; 2 Drama Desk Awards in 2007	
27	27	Hadestown	M	2,540	April 17, 2019		8 Tony Awards in 2019, including Best Musical; 4 Drama Desk Awards in 2019; Grammy Award for Best Musical Theater Album in 2020	Currently running at the Walter Kerr Theatre (venue since opening)
28	20	Avenue Q	M	2,534	July 31, 2003	September 13, 2009	3 Tony Awards in 2004, including Best Musical	Original production moved Off-Broadway to New World Stages and ran for an additional 4,035 performances, closing May 26, 2019.
29	25	Kinky Boots	M	2,505	April 4, 2013	April 7, 2019	6 Tony Awards in 2013, including Best Musical; A Drama Desk Award in 2013; Grammy Award for Best Musical Theater Album in 2014	
30	18	The Producers	M	2,502	April 19, 2001	April 22, 2007	12 Tony Awards in 2001, including Best Musical; 11 Drama Desk Awards in 2001, including Outstanding Musical; Grammy Award for Best Musical Show Album in 2002	Currently (2026) holds the record of Broadway production with the most Tony Award wins, winning 12.
31	27	Beautiful: The Carole King Musical	M	2,416	January 12, 2014	October 27, 2019	2 Tony Awards in 2014; 3 Drama Desk Awards in 2014; Grammy Award for Best Musical Theater Album in 2015	
32	9	Annie	M	2,377	April 21, 1977	January 2, 1983	7 Tony Awards in 1977, including Best Musical; 7 Drama Desk Awards in 1977, including Outstanding Musical; Grammy Award for Best Cast Show Album in 1978	Revivals in 1997 (239 performances) and 2012 (487 performances)
32	18*	Cabaret (1998 revival)	M	2,377	March 19, 1998	January 4, 2004	4 Tony Awards in 1998, including Best Revival of a Musical; 3 Drama Desk Awards in 1998, including Outstanding Revival of a Musical	Original production in 1966 (1,165 performances) and revivals in 1987 (261 performances), 2014 (388 performances), and 2024 (592 performances)
34	6	Man of La Mancha	M	2,328	November 22, 1965	June 26, 1971	5 Tony Awards in 1966, including Best Musical	Revivals in 1972 (140 performances), 1977 (124 performances), 1992 (108 performances), and 2002 (304 performances)
34	27*	Rock of Ages	M	2,328	April 7, 2009	January 18, 2015		
36	1	Abie's Irish Rose	P	2,327	May 23, 1922	October 1, 1927		First ever Broadway production with 2,000+ performances; Revivals in 1937 (46 performances) and 1954 (20 performances)
37	37	Moulin Rouge!	M	2,297	July 25, 2019	August 30, 2026	10 Tony Awards in 2020, including Best Musical; 5 Drama Desk Awards in 2020	
38	4	Oklahoma!	M	2,212	March 31, 1943	May 29, 1948	A Special Tony Award in 1993 for the show's 50th anniversary	Revivals in 1951 (100 performances), 1953 (40 performances), 1979 (293 performances), 2002 (388 performances), and 2019 (328 performances)
39	39	Six	M	2,129	October 3, 2021	January 3, 2027	2 Tony Awards in 2022; 4 Drama Desk Awards in 2022	Currently running at the Lena Horne Theatre (venue since opening)
40	19	Smokey Joe's Cafe	R	2,036	March 2, 1995	January 16, 2000		Broadway's longest running original music revue. The longest running musical revue, Oh! Calcutta!, was a revival.
41	41	MJ the Musical	M	2,005	February 1, 2022		4 Tony Awards in 2022; 2 Drama Desk Awards in 2022	Currently running at the Neil Simon Theatre (venue since opening)
42	10	Pippin	M	1,944	October 23, 1972	June 12, 1977	5 Tony Awards in 1973; 5 Drama Desk Awards in 1973	Revival in 2013 (709 performances)
43	5	South Pacific	M	1,925	April 7, 1949	January 16, 1954	10 Tony Awards in 1950, including Best Musical; Pulitzer Prize for Drama in 1950	Revivals in 1955 (15 performances) and 2008 (996 performances); Held the record of Broadway production with the most Tony Award wins for 51 years with 10 wins, until it was surpassed by The Producers, which won 12.
44	12	The Magic Show	M	1,920	May 28, 1974	December 31, 1978		
45	27	Aida	M	1,852	March 23, 2000	September 5, 2004	4 Tony Awards in 2000; A Drama Desk Award in 2000; Grammy Award for Best Musical Show Album in 2001	
46	16	Gemini	P	1,819	May 21, 1977	September 6, 1981		
47	17	Deathtrap	P	1,793	February 26, 1978	June 13, 1982		
48	5	Harvey	P	1,775	November 1, 1944	January 15, 1949		Revival in 1970 (79 performances) and 2012 (62 performances)
49	19	Dancin'	D	1,774	March 27, 1978	June 27, 1982	2 Tony Awards in 1978; 2 Drama Desk Awards in 1978	Revival in 2023 (65 performances); Broadway's longest-running dance musical
50	22	La Cage aux Folles	M	1,761	August 21, 1983	November 15, 1987	6 Tony Awards in 1984, including Best Musical; 3 Drama Desk Awards in 1984	Revivals in 2004 (229 performances) and 2010 (433 performances)
51	11	Hair	M	1,750	April 29, 1968	July 1, 1972	A Drama Desk Award in 1968; Grammy Award for Best Score from an Original Cast Show Album in 1969	Revivals in 1977 (43 performances), 2004 (1 benefit performance), 2009 (519 performances), and 2011 (67 performances)
52	52	& Juliet	M	1,675	November 17, 2022	January 3, 2027		Currently running at the Stephen Sondheim Theatre (venue since opening)
53	47	Dear Evan Hansen	M	1,672	December 4, 2016	September 18, 2022	6 Tony Awards in 2017, including Best Musical; Grammy Award for Best Musical Theater Album in 2018	
53	15*	The Wiz	M	1,672	January 5, 1975	January 28, 1979	7 Tony Awards in 1975, including Best Musical; 5 Drama Desk Awards in 1975, including Outstanding Musical; Grammy Award for Best Cast Show Album in 1976	Revivals in 1984 (13 performances) and 2024 (142 performances)
55	49	Come from Away	M	1,669	March 12, 2017	October 2, 2022	A Tony Award in 2017; 3 Drama Desk Awards in 2017, including Outstanding Musical	
56	6	Born Yesterday	P	1,642	February 4, 1946	December 31, 1949		Revivals in 1989 (153 performances) and 2011 (73 performances)
57	29	Crazy for You	M	1,622	February 19, 1992	January 7, 1996	3 Tony Awards in 1992, including Best Musical; 2 Drama Desk Awards in 1992, including Outstanding Musical	
58	23	Ain't Misbehavin'	R	1,604	May 9, 1978	February 21, 1982	3 Tony Awards in 1978, including Best Musical; 3 Drama Desk Awards in 1978, including Outstanding Musical; Grammy Award for Best Cast Show Album in 1979	Revival in 1988 (176 performances)
59	24	The Best Little Whorehouse in Texas	M	1,584	June 19, 1978	March 27, 1982	2 Tony Awards in 1979; 3 Drama Desk Awards in 1978	Revivals in 1982 (63 performances) and 2006 (1 benefit performance)
60	44	Spamalot	M	1,575	March 17, 2005	January 11, 2009	3 Tony Awards in 2005, including Best Musical; 3 Drama Desk Awards in 2005, including Outstanding Musical; Grammy Award for Best Musical Show Album in 2006	Revival in 2023 (164 performances)
61	9	Mary, Mary	P	1,572	March 8, 1961	December 12, 1964		
62	26	Evita	M	1,567	September 25, 1979	June 26, 1983	7 Tony Awards in 1980, including Best Musical; 6 Drama Desk Awards in 1980, including Outstanding Musical; Grammy Award for Best Cast Show Album in 1981	Revivals in 2012 (337 performances) and 2027
63	5	The Voice of the Turtle	P	1,557	December 8, 1943	January 3, 1948		
64	53	Matilda the Musical	M	1,554	April 11, 2013	January 1, 2017	4 Tony Awards in 2013; 5 Drama Desk Awards in 2013, including Outstanding Musical; A Tony Honors for Excellence in Theatre in 2013 for the four original leading actresses	
65	57	Waitress	M	1,544	April 24, 2016	January 5, 2020	A Drama Desk Award in 2016	Revival in 2021 (122 performances)
66	39	Jekyll & Hyde	M	1,543	April 28, 1997	January 7, 2001	2 Drama Desk Awards in 1997	Revival in 2013 (30 performances)
67	11	Barefoot in the Park	P	1,530	October 23, 1963	June 25, 1967	A Tony Award in 1964	Revival in 2006 (109 performances)
68	45	42nd Street (2001 revival)	M	1,524	May 2, 2001	January 2, 2005	2 Tony Awards in 2001, including Best Revival of a Musical; A Drama Desk Award in 2001, Outstanding Revival of a Musical	Original production in 1980 (3,486 performances)
69	30	Dreamgirls	M	1,521	December 20, 1981	August 11, 1985	6 Tony Awards in 1982; 4 Drama Desk Awards in 1982; Grammy Award for Best Cast Show Album in 1983	Revivals in 1987 (177 performances) and 2001 (1 benefit performance)
70	15	Mame	M	1,508	May 24, 1966	January 3, 1970	3 Tony Awards in 1966; Grammy Award for Best Score from an Original Cast Show Album in 1967	Revival in 1983 (41 performances)
71	39	Grease (1994 revival)	M	1,505	May 11, 1994	January 25, 1998		Original production in 1972 (3,388 performances) and revival in 2007 (554 performances)
72	21	Same Time, Next Year	P	1,453	March 14, 1975	September 3, 1978	A Tony Award in 1975; 2 Drama Desk Awards in 1975, including Outstanding Play	
73	4	Arsenic and Old Lace	P	1,444	January 10, 1941	June 17, 1944		Revival in 1986 (221 performances)
74	11	The Sound of Music	M	1,443	November 16, 1959	June 15, 1963	5 Tony Awards in 1960, including Best Musical; Grammy Award for Best Show Album (Original Cast) in 1961	Revivals in 1998 (533 performances) and 2027
75	37	Me and My Girl	M	1,420	August 10, 1986	December 31, 1989	3 Tony Awards in 1987; 5 Drama Desk Awards in 1987	
76	13	How to Succeed in Business Without Really Trying	M	1,417	October 14, 1961	March 6, 1965	7 Tony Awards in 1962, including Best Musical; Pulitzer Prize for Drama in 1962; Grammy Award for Best Original Cast Show Album in 1962	Revivals in 1995 (548 performances) and 2011 (473 performances)
77	3	Hellzapoppin	R	1,404	September 22, 1938	December 17, 1941		
78	12	The Music Man	M	1,375	December 19, 1957	April 15, 1961	6 Tony Awards in 1958, including Best Musical; Grammy Award for Best Original Cast Album (Broadway or TV) in 1959	Revivals in 1980 (21 performances), 2000 (699 performances), and 2022 (373 performances)
79	19	Funny Girl	M	1,348	March 26, 1964	July 1, 1967	Grammy Award for Best Score from an Original Cast Show Album in 1965	Revivals in 2002 (1 benefit performance) and 2022 (569 performances)
80	30	Mummenschanz	S	1,326	March 30, 1977	April 20, 1980		Broadway's longest-running special
81	23	Oh! Calcutta!	R	1,314	June 17, 1969	August 12, 1972		Original production; Revival in 1976 (5,959 performances)
82	66	Billy Elliot the Musical	M	1,312	November 13, 2008	January 8, 2012	10 Tony Awards in 2009, including Best Musical; 10 Drama Desk Awards in 2009, including Outstanding Musical	
83	74	School of Rock	M	1,309	December 6, 2015	January 20, 2019		
84	62	Movin' Out	D	1,303	October 24, 2002	December 11, 2005	2 Tony Awards in 2003; A Drama Desk Award in 2003	
85	42	Brighton Beach Memoirs	P	1,299	March 27, 1983	May 11, 1986	A Tony Award in 1983	Revival in 2009 (9 performances)
86	6	Angel Street	P	1,295	December 5, 1941	December 30, 1944		Revivals in 1948 (14 performances) and 1975 (52 performances)
87	1	Lightnin'	P	1,291	August 26, 1918	August 27, 1921		First ever Broadway production with 1,000+ performances; Revival in 1938 (54 performances)
88	25	Promises, Promises	M	1,281	December 1, 1968	January 1, 1972	2 Tony Awards in 1969; 2 Drama Desk Awards in 1969; Grammy Award for Best Score from an Original Cast Show Album in 1970	Revival in 2010 (289 performances)
89	13	The King and I	M	1,246	March 29, 1951	March 20, 1954	5 Tony Awards in 1952, including Best Musical	Revivals in 1977 (695 performances), 1985 (191 performances), 1996 (780 performances), and 2015 (499 performances)
90	24	Cactus Flower	P	1,234	December 8, 1965	November 23, 1968		
91	46	Torch Song Trilogy	P	1,230	June 10, 1982	May 19, 1985	2 Tony Awards in 1983, including Best Play; 2 Drama Desk Awards in 1983, including Outstanding Play	Revival in 2018 (77 performances)
92	29	Sleuth	P	1,222	November 12, 1970	October 13, 1973	A Tony Award in 1971, Best Play	
93	28	1776	M	1,217	March 16, 1969	February 13, 1972	3 Tony Awards in 1969, including Best Musical; 2 Drama Desk Awards in 1969	Revivals in 1997 (333 performances) and 2022 (105 performances)
94	34	Equus	P	1,209	October 24, 1974	October 2, 1977	2 Tony Awards in 1975, including Best Play; 4 Drama Desk Awards in 1975, including Outstanding Play	Revival in 2008 (156 performances)
95	47	Sugar Babies	R	1,208	October 8, 1979	August 28, 1982		
96	13	Guys and Dolls	M	1,200	November 24, 1950	November 28, 1953	5 Tony Awards in 1951, including Best Musical	Revivals in 1955 (31 performances), 1965 (15 performances), 1976 (239 performances), 1992 (1,143 performances), and 2009 (121 performances)
97	79	In the Heights	M	1,184	March 9, 2008	January 9, 2011	4 Tony Awards in 2008, including Best Musical; Grammy Award for Best Musical Show Album in 2009	
98	50	Amadeus	P	1,181	December 17, 1980	October 16, 1983	5 Tony Awards in 1981, including Best Play; 3 Drama Desk Awards in 1981, including Outstanding Play	Revival in 1999 (173 performances)
99	84	Once	M	1,168	March 18, 2012	January 4, 2015	8 Tony Awards in 2012, including Best Musical; 4 Drama Desk Awards in 2012, including Outstanding Musical; Grammy Award for Best Musical Theater Album in 2013	
100	27	Cabaret	M	1,165	November 20, 1966	September 6, 1969	8 Tony Awards in 1967, including Best Musical; Grammy Award for Best Score from an Original Cast Show Album in 1968	Revivals in 1987 (261 performances), 1998 (2,377 performances), 2014 (388 performances), and 2024 (592 performances)
100	83*	Memphis	M	1,165	October 19, 2009	August 5, 2012	4 Tony Awards in 2010, including Best Musical; 4 Drama Desk Awards in 2010, including Outstanding Musical	
102	12	Mister Roberts	P	1,157	February 18, 1948	January 6, 1951	5 Tony Awards in 1948, including Best Play	
103	12	Annie Get Your Gun	M	1,147	May 16, 1946	February 12, 1949		Revivals in 1966 (78 performances) and 1999 (1,045 performances); Oldest 1000+ original to be joined by 1000+ revival
104	64	Guys and Dolls (1992 revival)	M	1,143	April 14, 1992	January 8, 1995	4 Tony Awards in 1992, including Best Revival of a Musical; 7 Drama Desk Awards in 1992, including Outstanding Revival of a Musical; Grammy Award for Best Musical Show Album in 1993	Original production in 1950 (1,200 performances) and revivals in 1955 (16 performances), 1965 (15 performances), 1976 (239 performances), and 2009 (121 performances)
105	17	The Seven Year Itch	P	1,141	November 20, 1952	August 13, 1955	A Tony Award in 1953	
106	83	The 25th Annual Putnam County Spelling Bee	M	1,136	May 2, 2005	January 20, 2008	2 Tony Awards in 2005; 3 Drama Desk Awards in 2005	
107	69	Bring in 'da Noise, Bring in 'da Funk	D	1,135	April 25, 1996	January 10, 1999	4 Tony Awards in 1996; 2 Drama Desk Awards in 1996	
108	35	Butterflies Are Free	P	1,128	October 21, 1969	July 2, 1972	A Tony Award in 1970	
109	4	Pins and Needles	R	1,108	November 27, 1937	June 22, 1940		
110	32	Plaza Suite	P	1,097	February 14, 1968	October 3, 1970	A Tony Award in 1968	Revival in 2022 (110 performances)
111	78	Fosse	D	1,093	January 14, 1999	August 25, 2001	3 Tony Awards in 1999, including Best Musical; A Drama Desk Award in 1999	
112	112	The Outsiders	M	1,090	April 11, 2024		4 Tony Awards in 2024, including Best Musical; 2 Drama Desk Awards in 2024	Currently running at the Bernard B. Jacobs Theatre (venue since opening)
113	54	They're Playing Our Song	M	1,082	February 11, 1979	September 6, 1981		
114	15	Kiss Me, Kate	M	1,077	December 30, 1948	July 28, 1951	5 Tony Awards in 1949, including Best Musical	Revivals in 1952 (8 performances), 1999 (881 performances), and 2019 (125 performances); First show to win the Tony Award for Best Musical, among other Tony awards
115	115	The Great Gatsby	M	1,076	April 25, 2024		A Tony Award in 2024; A Drama Desk Award in 2024	Currently running at the Broadway Theatre (venue since opening)
116	98	Spider-Man: Turn Off the Dark	M	1,066	June 14, 2011	January 4, 2014		Most expensive production in Broadway history; Longest preview period in Broadway history (182 previews)
117	41	Don't Bother Me, I Can't Cope	R	1,065	April 19, 1972	October 27, 1974	2 Drama Desk Awards in 1972; Grammy Award for Best Score from an Original Cast Show Album in 1973	
118	20	The Pajama Game	M	1,063	May 13, 1954	November 24, 1956	3 Tony Awards in 1955, including Best Musical	Revivals in 1973 (65 performances) and 2006 (129 performances)
119	47	Shenandoah	M	1,050	January 7, 1975	August 7, 1977	2 Tony Awards in 1975; 2 Drama Desk Awards in 1975	Revival in 1989 (32 performances)
120	84	Annie Get Your Gun (1999 revival)	M	1,045	March 4, 1999	September 1, 2001	2 Tony Awards in 1999, including Best Revival of a Musical; A Drama Desk Award in 1999; A Special Drama Desk Award in 2001 for Reba McEntire; Grammy Award for Best Musical Show Album in 2000	Original production in 1946 (1,147 performances) and revival in 1966 (78 performances)
121	20	The Teahouse of the August Moon	P	1,027	October 15, 1953	March 24, 1956	3 Tony Awards in 1954, including Best Play; Pulitzer Prize for Drama in 1954	
122	109	Les Misérables (2014 revival)	M	1,024	March 23, 2014	September 4, 2016		Original production in 1987 (6,680 performances) and revival in 2006 (463 performances)
123	22	Damn Yankees	M	1,019	May 5, 1955	October 12, 1957	7 Tony Awards in 1956, including Best Musical	Revivals in 1994 (533 performances) and 2027
124	73	Grand Hotel	M	1,017	November 12, 1989	April 25, 1992	5 Tony Awards in 1990; 5 Drama Desk Awards in 1990	
125	89	Contact	D	1,010	March 30, 2000	September 1, 2002	4 Tony Awards in 2000, including Best Musical; 4 Drama Desk Awards in 2000, including Outstanding Musical	
126	28	Never Too Late	P	1,007	November 27, 1962	April 24, 1965		
127	57	Beatlemania	M	1,006	May 31, 1977	October 17, 1979		
128	72	Big River	M	1,005	April 25, 1985	September 20, 1987	7 Tony Awards in 1985, including Best Musical; 7 Drama Desk Awards in 1985	Revival in 2003 (67 performances)
129	111	Newsies	M	1,004	March 29, 2012	August 24, 2014	2 Tony Awards in 2012; 2 Drama Desk Awards in 2012	

*The show originally was tied with an older show that had the exact number of performances

== Timeline of longest-running Broadway shows ==
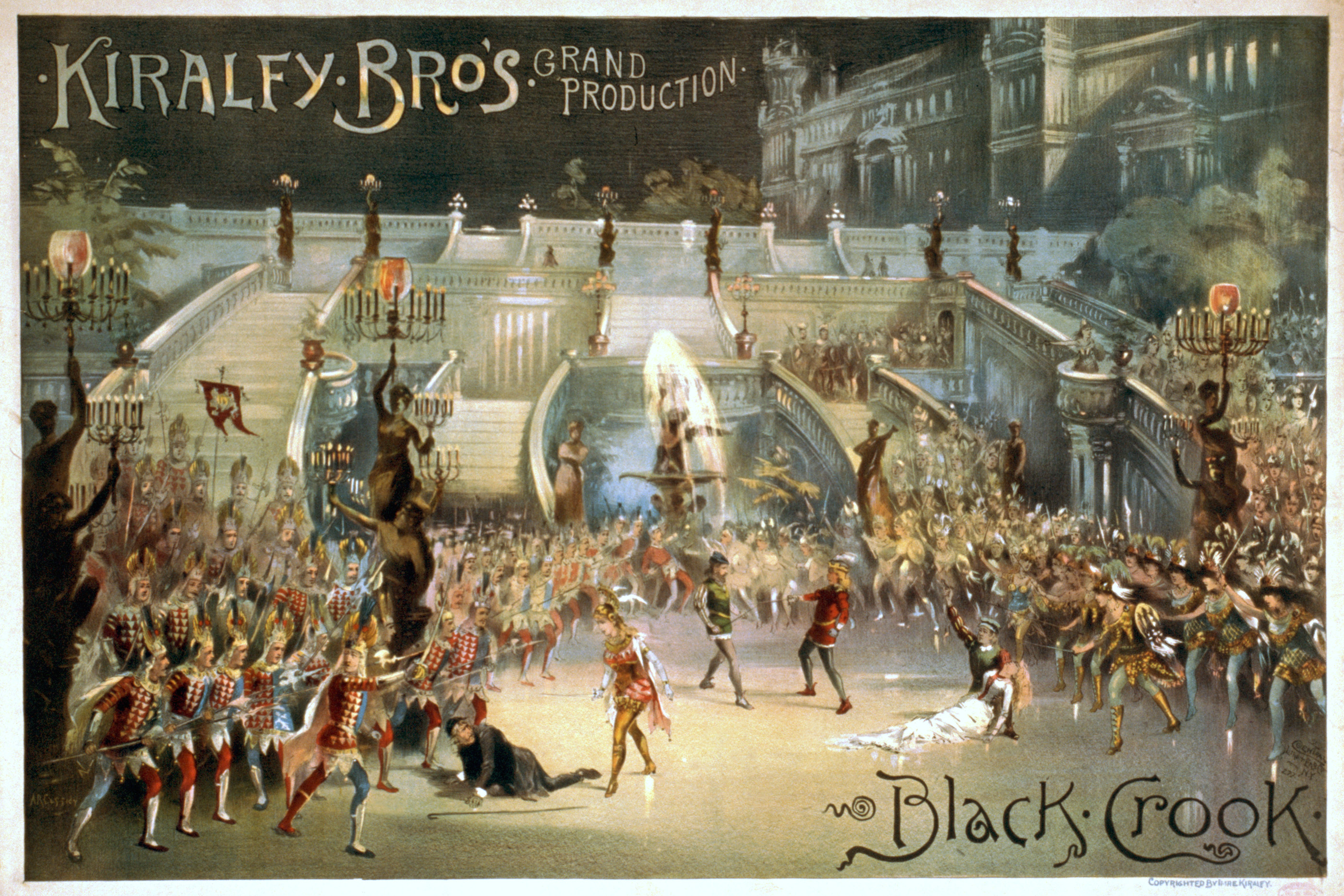
The Black Crook, which ran from 1866 to 1868, was the first Broadway show to run for over one year.

This is a list of shows that have held the record for being the longest-running show (including straight plays and musicals) on Broadway since 1853. A few probable longest-running plays prior to 1853 are also listed.

Not included below is the 1976 revival of the revue Oh! Calcutta!, which briefly overtook A Chorus Line as the Broadway show which had played the most performances, even though A Chorus Line had opened more than a year earlier and was still playing. Oh! Calcutta! achieved this distinction by playing more than the standard eight performances per week. A Chorus Line retook the record for most performances after Oh! Calcutta! closed.

The longest running off-Broadway musical to date is The Fantasticks, which starred Jerry Orbach. When it closed on January 13, 2002, it had run for 42 years and 17,162 performances, making it the world's longest-running musical. The current longest-running musical on Broadway is The Phantom of the Opera, which opened in 1988 and played its final performance in 2023.

M denotes a musical and P denotes a straight play.

Took lead	Title	Type	Opening date	Closing date	Performances	Comments/Notes
January 9, 2006	The Phantom of the Opera	M	January 26, 1988	April 16, 2023	13,981	7 Tony Awards in 1988, including Best Musical; 7 Drama Desk Awards in 1988; Broadway's longest-running show and musical
June 19, 1997	Cats	M	October 7, 1982	September 10, 2000	7,485	7 Tony Awards in 1983, including Best Musical; 3 Drama Desk Awards in 1983; Grammy Award for Best Cast Show Album in 1984; Revival in 2016 (593 performances) and 2026
September 29, 1983	A Chorus Line	M	July 25, 1975	April 28, 1990	6,137	9 Tony Awards in 1976, including Best Musical; 5 Drama Desk Awards in 1976, including Outstanding Musical; A Special Tony Award in 1984 for becoming Broadway's longest-running musical; Pulitzer Prize for Drama in 1976; Revival in 2006 (759 performances)
December 8, 1979	Grease	M	February 14, 1972	April 13, 1980	3,388	2 Drama Desk Awards in 1972; Revivals in 1994 (1,505 performances) and 2007 (554 performances)
June 17, 1972	Fiddler on the Roof	M	September 22, 1964	July 2, 1972	3,242	Became longest running musical in July 1971, at 2,845 performances passing 2,844 mark of Hello Dolly!.; 9 Tony Awards in 1965, including Best Musical; A Special Tony Award in 1972 for becoming Broadway's longest-running musical; Revivals in 1976 (167 performances), 1981 (53 performances), 1990, (241 performances), 2004 (781 performances), and 2015 (431 performances)
June 14, 1947	Life with Father	P	November 8, 1939	July 12, 1947	3,224	Broadway's longest-running straight play. Started at Empire Theatre, moved to the Bijou Theatre in 1945, and finished up its run in 1947 at the Alvin Theatre.
June 1939	Tobacco Road	P	December 4, 1933	May 31, 1941	3,182	Revivals in 1942 (34 performances), 1943 (66 performances), and 1950 (7 performances)
May 23, 1925	Abie's Irish Rose	P	May 23, 1923	October 1, 1927	2,327	Revivals in 1937 (46 performances) and 1954 (20 performances)
March 17, 1920	Lightnin'	P	August 26, 1918	August 27, 1921	1,291	Revival in 1938 (54 performances)
June 22, 1893	A Trip to Chinatown	M	November 9, 1891	August 7, 1893	657	
December 1885	Adonis	M	September 4, 1884	April 17, 1886	603	
May 1881	Hazel Kirke	P	February 4, 1880	May 31, 1881	486	250th performance programme claimed play had exceeded number of consecutive performances of any "similar play" in the country on its 238th performance, which is no doubt a reference to Pique (1875) which ran for 237 performances.
March 1868	Humpty Dumpty	M	March 10, 1868	May 15, 1869	483	Revival in 1871-1872 (333 performances)
August 5, 1867	The Black Crook	M	September 12, 1866	January 4, 1868	474	First Broadway show to run for over one year. In terms of a "musical", The Seven Sisters (1860–61, 253 perf.), was probably the longest running show closest to a "musical" prior to this.
1853	Uncle Tom's Cabin (Aiken version)	P	August 8, 1853	May 13, 1854	325	Has generally been classified as a play, though some arguments have been made that it was a musical. Played at the National Theatre.
1850	The Drunkard	P	1850	October 7, 1850?	100	As of October 7, 1850, it hit 100 consecutive performances in New York, the first play to do so. At Barnum's American Museum. It debuted in 1844 outside New York at the Boston Museum.
September 24, 1844	Putnam, the Iron Son of '76	P	August 5, 1844	November 2, 1844	78	At the Bowery Theatre. If Mazeppa ran 43 nights in 1833 and was previous record, Putnam became most performed on its 44th performance on September 24, 1844.
1833	Mazeppa, Or, The Wild Horse of Ukraine	P	July 22, 1833	September 9, 1833	43	At the Bowery Theatre with George Gale as Mazeppa.
1831	The Elephant of Siam and the Fire Fiend by Samuel Beazley	P	January 10, 1831	?	18	At the Bowery Theatre, the first season under Thomas S. Hamblin, who embraced melodramas which might support longer runs. The Elephant of Siam featured the elephant Mademoiselle D'Jeck, who of course needed to be used while available. The Water Witch, an adaption of a James Fenimore Cooper novel by Charles W. Taylor, which debuted on March 10, 1831, at the Bowery, also played for 18 performances.

== See also ==
- Long-running musical theatre productions
- Long-running plays (non-musicals)
- List of the longest-running West End shows
- List of the shortest-running Broadway shows
